= Unification of Italy =

1848–1870 consolidation of Italian states

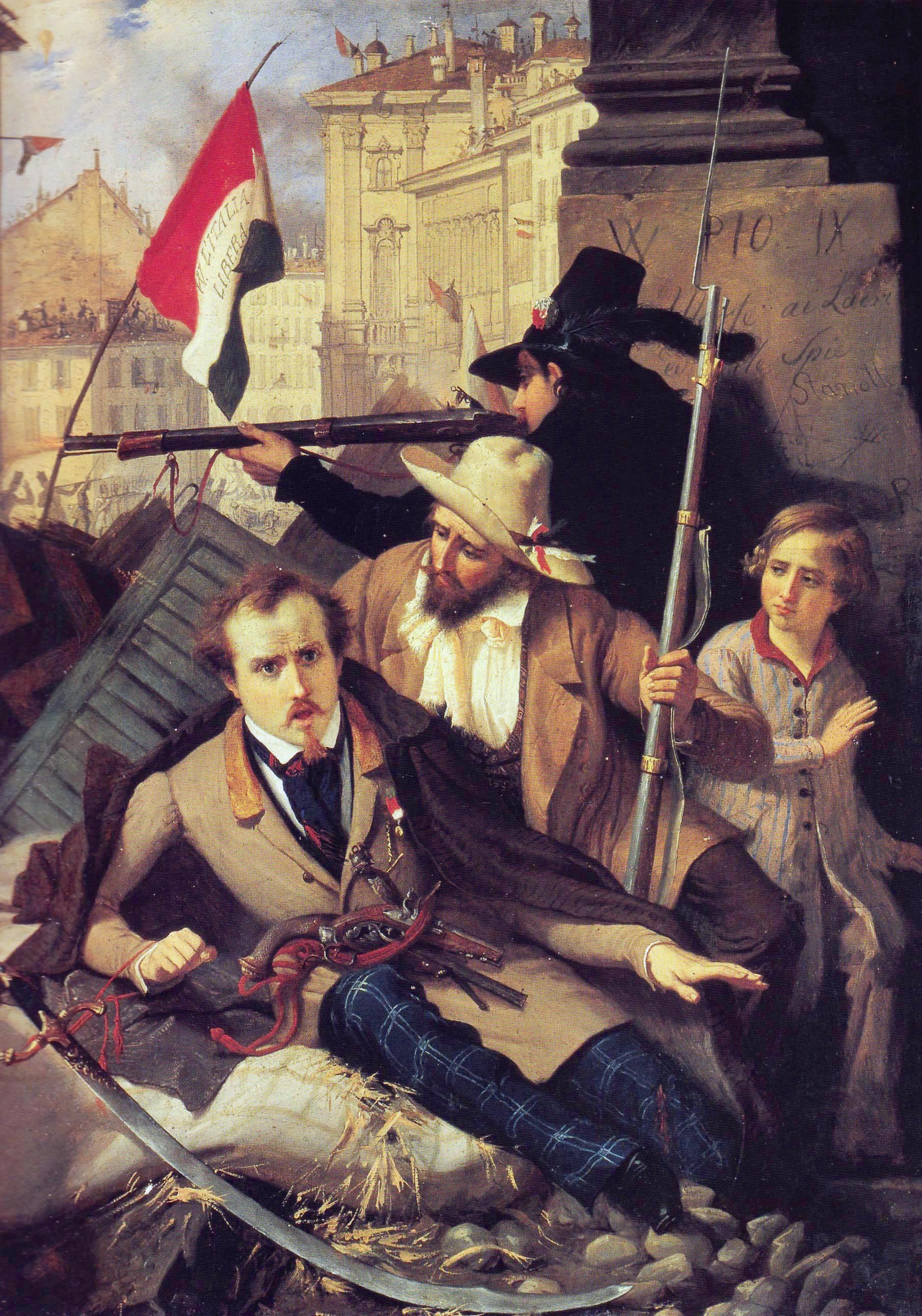
- Five Days of Milan, 18–22 March 1848
- Native name: Risorgimento
- Date: 1848–1861/1871
- Location: Italy
- Participants: Italian society, Kingdom of Sardinia, Provisional Government of Milan, Republic of San Marco, Kingdom of Sicily, Roman Republic, Carboneria, French Empire, Redshirts, Hungarian legion, Southern Army, United Provinces of Central Italy, Kingdom of Italy
- Outcome: Proclamation of the Kingdom of Italy (1861); Capture of Rome; Rome becomes the capital of the Kingdom of Italy (1871)

The unification of Italy (Italian: Unità d'Italia [uniˈta‿ddiˈtaːlja]), also known as the Risorgimento (Italian: [risordʒiˈmento]; lit. 'Resurgence'), was the 19th-century political and social movement that in 1861 ended in the annexation of various states of the Italian Peninsula and its outlying isles to the Kingdom of Sardinia, resulting in the creation of the Kingdom of Italy. Inspired by the rebellions in the 1820s and 1830s against the outcome of the Congress of Vienna, the unification process was precipitated by the Revolutions of 1848, and reached completion in 1871 with the official designation of Rome as capital of Italy, following the capture of Rome in 1870.

Individuals who played a major part in the struggle for unification and liberation from foreign domination included King Victor Emmanuel II; politician, economist and statesman Camillo Benso, Count of Cavour; general Giuseppe Garibaldi; and journalist and politician Giuseppe Mazzini. Borrowing from the old Latin title Pater Patriae of the Roman emperors, the Italians gave to King Victor Emmanuel II the epithet of Father of the Fatherland (Italian: Padre della Patria). Even after 1871, many ethnic Italian speakers, most notably those living in Trentino and Venezia Giulia, remained outside of the borders of the Kingdom of Italy, planting the seeds of Italian irredentism. The annexation of Trento and Trieste in 1918, at the end of World War I, is often considered the culmination of the Italian unification movement.

Italy celebrates the anniversary of the unification on 17 March (the date of proclamation of the Kingdom of Italy). Some of the states that had been envisaged as part of the unification process (terre irredente) did not join the Kingdom until after Italy defeated Austria-Hungary in World War I, culminating in the Treaty of Rapallo in 1920. Some historians see the Risorgimento as continuing to that time, which is the view presented at the Central Museum of the Risorgimento at Altare della Patria in Rome.

== Background ==
=== From ancient times to early modern era ===
Italy was unified by the Roman Republic in the latter part of the third century BCE. For 700 years, it was a de facto territorial extension of the capital of the Roman Republic and Empire, and for a long time experienced a privileged status but was not converted into a province. Under Augustus, the previous differences in municipal and political rights were abolished and Roman Italy was subdivided into administrative regions ruled directly by the Roman Senate.

After the fall of the Western Roman Empire, Italy remained united under the Ostrogothic Kingdom and after 568 was disputed between the Kingdom of the Lombards and the Byzantine (Eastern Roman) Empire, losing its unity for centuries. Following conquest by the Frankish Empire, the title of King of Italy merged with the office of Holy Roman Emperor; however, the emperor was an absentee German-speaking foreigner who had little interest in governing Italy and indeed never controlled the entire peninsula. As a result, Italy gradually developed into a system of city-states. Southern Italy was governed by the long-lasting Kingdom of Sicily or Kingdom of Naples, which had been established by the Normans. Central Italy was governed by the pope as a temporal kingdom known as the Papal States.

This situation persisted through the Renaissance but began to deteriorate with the rise of modern nation-states in the early modern period. Italy, including the Papal States, then became the site of proxy wars between the major powers, notably the Holy Roman Empire (including Austria), Spain, and France. Harbingers of national unity appeared in the treaty of the Italic League, in 1454, and the 15th-century foreign policy of Cosimo de' Medici and Lorenzo de' Medici. Leading Renaissance Italian writers Dante, Petrarch, Boccaccio, Machiavelli and Guicciardini expressed a desire to see Italy become a unified nation. Petrarch stated that the "ancient valour in Italian hearts is not yet dead" in Italia Mia. Machiavelli later quoted four verses from Italia Mia in The Prince, which looked forward to a political leader who would unite Italy "to free her from the barbarians".

The Italian Wars saw 65 years of French attacks on some of the Italian states, starting with Charles VIII's invasion of Naples in 1494. However, the Peace of Cateau-Cambrésis (1559) saw parts of Italy fall under the direct or indirect control of the Spanish Habsburgs. The Peace of Westphalia in 1648 formally ended the rule of the Holy Roman Emperors in Italy. However, the Spanish branch of the House of Habsburg, which ruled the Spanish Empire, continued to rule southern Italy and the Duchy of Milan until the War of the Spanish Succession (1701–14). Following this war the Austrian Habsburgs struggled for dominance with the Spanish Bourbons until the end of the War of the Austrian Succession.

A sense of Italian national identity was reflected in Gian Rinaldo Carli's Della Patria degli Italiani, written in 1764. It told how a stranger entered a café in Milan and puzzled its occupants by saying that he was neither a foreigner nor a Milanese. "'Then what are you?' they asked. 'I am an Italian', he explained."

=== French Revolution and Napoleonic era ===
Flag of the Cispadane Republic, which was the first Italian tricolour adopted by a sovereign Italian state (1797)

The Habsburg rule in Italy came to an end with the campaigns of the French Revolutionary Wars in 1792–97 when a series of client republics were set up. In 1806, the Holy Roman Empire was dissolved by the last Roman-German Emperor, Francis II, after its defeat by Napoleon at the Battle of Austerlitz. French rule destroyed the old structures of feudalism in Italy and introduced modern ideas and efficient legal authority; it provided much of the intellectual force and social capital that fueled unification movements for decades after the First French Empire collapsed in 1814.

The French Republic spread republican principles, and the institutions of republican governments promoted citizenship over the rule of the Bourbons and Habsburgs and other dynasties. The reaction against any outside control challenged Napoleon Bonaparte's choice of rulers. As Napoleon's reign began to fail, the rulers he had installed tried to keep their thrones (among them Eugène de Beauharnais, Viceroy of Italy, and Joachim Murat, King of Naples) further feeding nationalistic sentiments. Beauharnais tried to get Austrian approval for his succession to Napoleon's Kingdom of Italy, and on 30 March 1815, Murat issued the Rimini Proclamation, which called on Italians to revolt against their Austrian occupiers. Although having little support, this proclamation along with the Neapolitan War were key factors in unification.

During the Napoleonic era, in 1797, the first official adoption of the Italian tricolour as a national flag by a sovereign Italian state, the Cispadane Republic, a Napoleonic sister republic of Revolutionary France, took place, on the basis of the events following the French Revolution (1789–1799) which, among its ideals, advocated the national self-determination. This event is celebrated by the Tricolour Day. The Italian national colours appeared for the first time on a tricolour cockade in 1789, anticipating by seven years the first green, white and red Italian military war flag, which was adopted by the Lombard Legion in 1796.

=== Reaction (1815–1848) ===
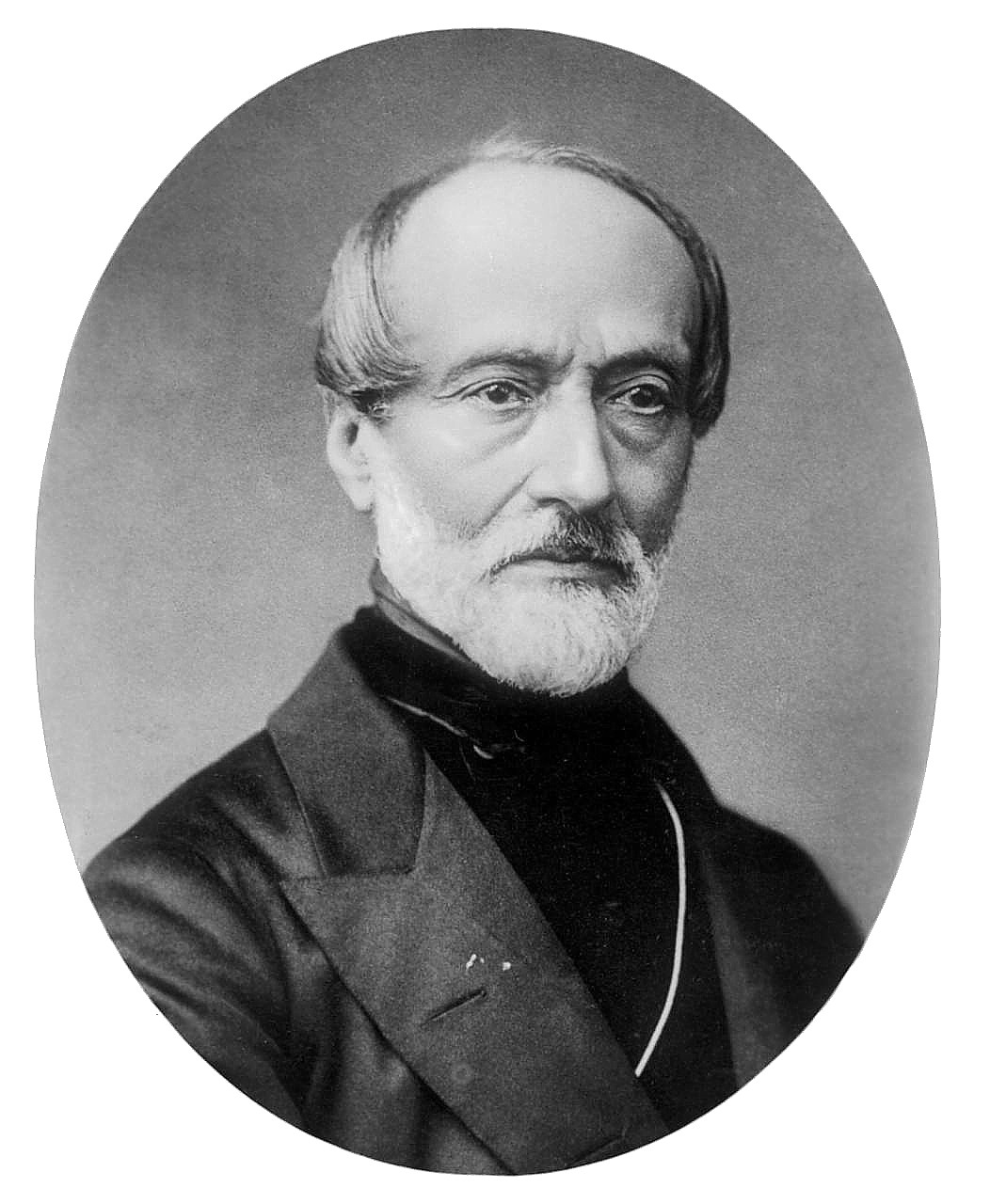
Giuseppe Mazzini, a highly influential leader of the Italian revolutionary movement

After Napoleon fell (1814/15), the Congress of Vienna (1814–15) restored the pre-Napoleonic patchwork of independent governments. Italy was again controlled largely by the Austrian Empire, as they directly controlled the Kingdom of Lombardy–Venetia and indirectly the duchies of Parma, Modena and Tuscany.

With the fall of Napoleon and the restoration of the absolutist monarchical regimes, the Italian tricolour went underground, becoming the symbol of the patriotic ferments that began to spread in Italy and the symbol which united all the efforts of the Italian people towards freedom and independence. The Italian tricolour waved for the first time in the history of the Risorgimento on 11 March 1821 in the Cittadella of Alessandria, during the revolutions of 1820s, after the oblivion caused by the restoration of the absolutist monarchical regimes.

An important figure of this period was Francesco Melzi d'Eril, serving as vice-president of the Napoleonic Italian Republic (1802–1805) and consistent supporter of the Italian unification ideals that would lead to the Italian Risorgimento shortly after his death. Meanwhile, artistic and literary sentiment also turned towards nationalism; Vittorio Alfieri, Francesco Lomonaco and Niccolò Tommaseo are generally considered three great literary precursors of Italian nationalism, but the most famous proto-nationalist work was Alessandro Manzoni's I promessi sposi (The Betrothed), widely read as thinly veiled allegorical criticism of Austrian rule. Published in 1827 and extensively revised in the following years, the 1840 version of I Promessi Sposi used a standardized version of the Tuscan dialect, a conscious effort by the author to provide a language and force people to learn it.

Three ideals of unification appeared. Vincenzo Gioberti, a Piedmontese priest, had suggested a confederation of Italian states under the leadership of the pope in his 1842 book Of the Moral and Civil Primacy of the Italians. Pope Pius IX at first appeared interested but he turned reactionary and led the battle against liberalism and nationalism.

Giuseppe Mazzini and Carlo Cattaneo wanted the unification of Italy under a federal republic, which proved too extreme for most nationalists. The middle position was proposed by Cesare Balbo (1789–1853) as a confederation of separate Italian states led by Piedmont.

=== Carbonari ===
Animated map of the Italian unification from 1829 to 1871

One of the most influential revolutionary groups was the Carbonari, a secret political discussion group formed in southern Italy early in the 19th century. After 1815, Freemasonry in Italy was repressed and discredited due to its French connections. A void was left that the Carbonari filled with a movement that closely resembled Freemasonry but with a commitment to Italian nationalism and no association with Napoleon and his government. The response came from middle-class professionals and businessmen and some intellectuals. The Carbonari disowned Napoleon but nevertheless were inspired by the principles of the French Revolution regarding liberty, equality and fraternity. They developed their own rituals and were strongly anticlerical. The Carbonari movement spread across Italy.

Conservative governments feared the Carbonari, imposing stiff penalties on men discovered to be members. Nevertheless, the movement survived and continued to be a source of political turmoil in Italy from 1820 until after unification. The Carbonari condemned Napoleon III (who, as a young man, had fought on their side) to death for failing to unite Italy, and the group almost succeeded in assassinating him in 1858, when Felice Orsini, Giovanni Andrea Pieri, Carlo Di Rudio and Andrea Gomez threw three bombs at him. Many leaders of the unification movement were at one time or other members of this organization. The chief purpose was to defeat tyranny and to establish constitutional government. Although contributing some service to the cause of Italian unity, historians such as Cornelia Shiver doubt that their achievements were proportional to their pretensions.

=== Giuseppe Mazzini and Giuseppe Garibaldi ===
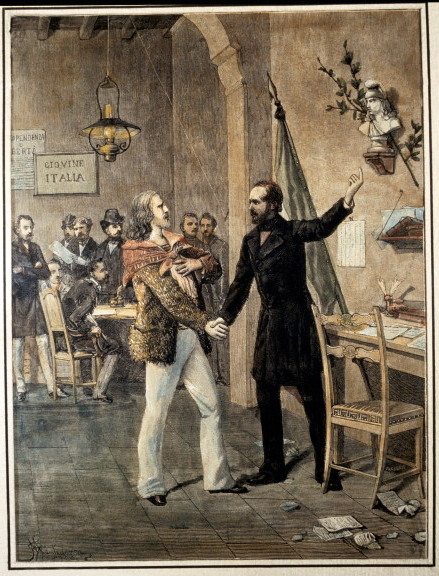
The first meeting between Garibaldi and Mazzini at the headquarters of Young Italy in 1833

Many leading Carbonari revolutionaries wanted a republic, two of the most prominent being Giuseppe Mazzini and Giuseppe Garibaldi. Mazzini's activity in revolutionary movements caused him to be imprisoned soon after he joined. While in prison, he concluded that Italy could, and therefore should be unified, and he formulated a program for establishing a free, independent, and republican nation with Rome as its capital. Following his release in 1831, he went to Marseille in France, where he organized a new political society called La Giovine Italia (Young Italy), whose mottos were "Dio e Popolo" ('God and People') and "Unione, Forza e Libertà" ('Union, Strength and Freedom"), which sought the unification of Italy.

Garibaldi, a native of Nice (then part of Piedmont), participated in an uprising in Piedmont in 1834 and was sentenced to death. He escaped to South America, spending fourteen years in exile, taking part in several wars, and learning the art of guerrilla warfare before his return to Italy in 1848.

== Early revolutionary activity ==
=== Exiles and European and masculine ideals ===
Many of the key intellectual and political leaders operated from exile; most Risorgimento patriots lived and published their work abroad after successive failed revolutions. Exile became a central theme of the foundational legacy of the Risorgimento as the narrative of the Italian nation fighting for independence. The exiles were deeply immersed in European ideas, and often hammered away at what Europeans saw as Italian vices, especially effeminacy and indolence. These negative stereotypes emerged from Enlightenment notions of national character that stressed the influence of the environment and history on a people's moral predisposition. Italian exiles both challenged and embraced the stereotypes and typically presented gendered interpretations of Italy's political "degeneration". They called for a masculine response to feminine weaknesses as the basis of national regeneration and fashioned their image of the future Italian nation firmly in the standards of European nationalism.

=== Two Sicilies insurrection ===
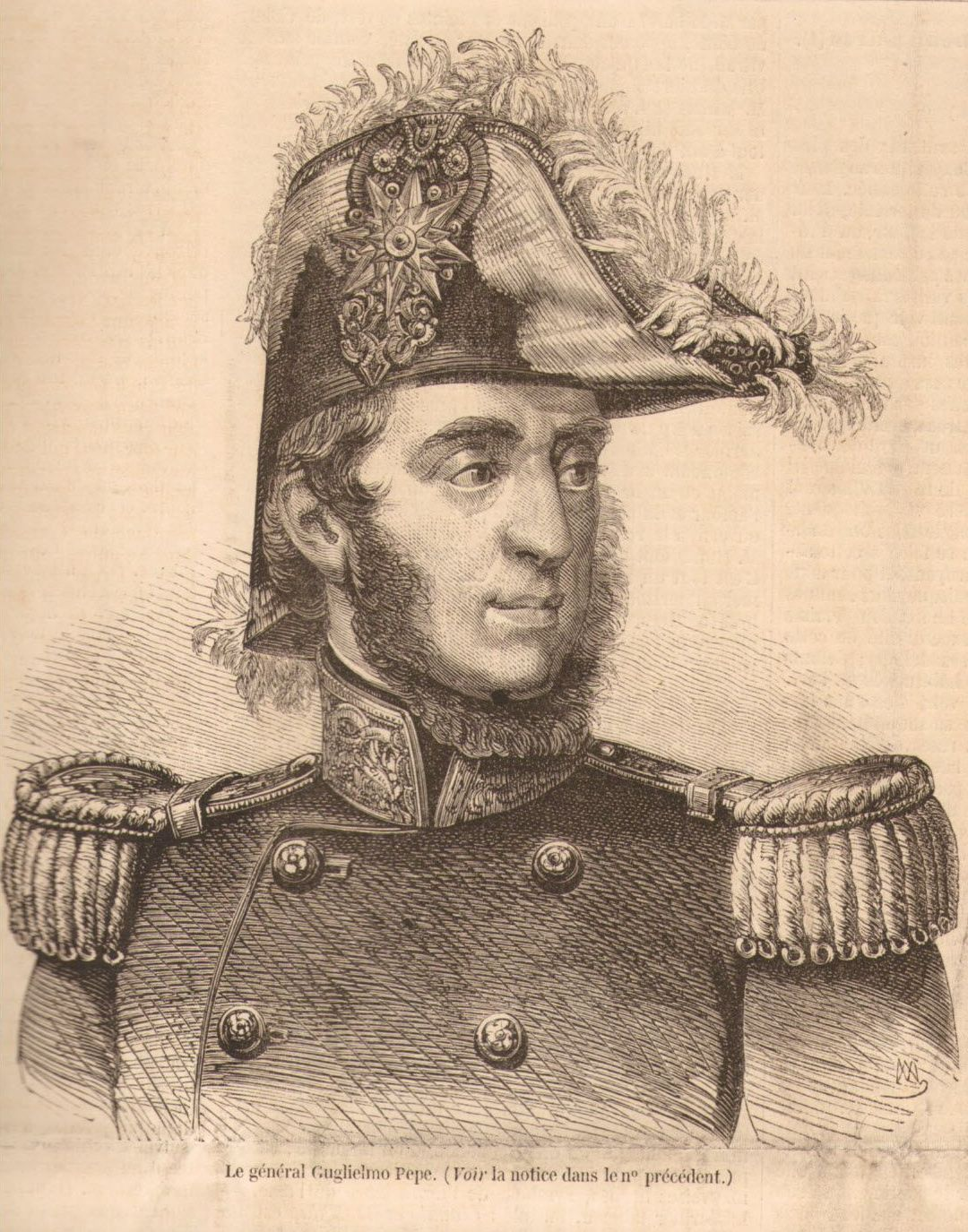
Guglielmo Pepe

In 1820, liberal Spaniards successfully revolted, demanding a Constitution, which influenced the development of a similar movement in Italy. Inspired by the Spaniards, a regiment in the army of the Kingdom of Two Sicilies, commanded by Guglielmo Pepe, a Carbonaro (member of the secret republican organization), mutinied, conquering the peninsular part of Two Sicilies. The king, Ferdinand I, agreed to enact a new constitution. The revolutionaries, although, failed to court popular support and fell to Austrian troops of the Holy Alliance. Ferdinand abolished the constitution and began systematically persecuting known revolutionaries. Many supporters of revolution in Sicily, including the scholar Michele Amari, were forced into exile during the decades that followed.

=== Piedmont insurrection ===
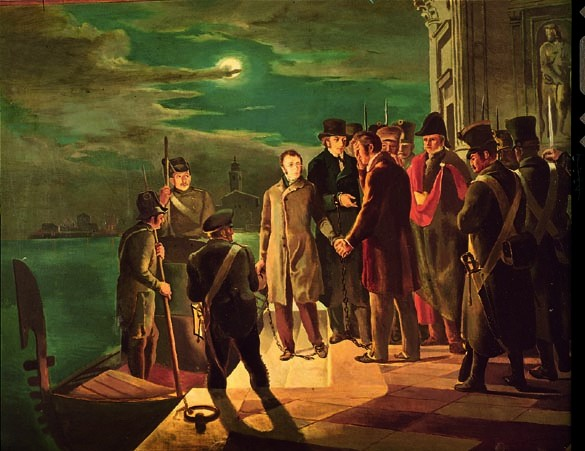
The Arrest of Silvio Pellico and Piero Maroncelli, Saluzzo, civic museum

The leader of the 1821 revolutionary movement in Piedmont was Santorre di Santarosa, who wanted to remove the Austrians and unify Italy under the House of Savoy. The Piedmont revolt started in Alessandria, where troops adopted the green, white, and red tricolore of the Cisalpine Republic. King Victor Emmanuel I abdicated in response, and the regent for the new king, Prince Charles Albert, approved a new constitution to appease the revolutionaries, but when King Charles Felix returned he disavowed the constitution and requested assistance from the Holy Alliance. Di Santarosa's troops were defeated, and the would-be Piedmontese revolutionary fled to Paris.

In Milan, Silvio Pellico and Pietro Maroncelli organized several attempts to weaken the hold of the Austrian despotism by indirect educational means. In October 1820, Pellico and Maroncelli were arrested on the charge of carbonarism and imprisoned.

=== 1830 insurrections ===
Denis Mack Smith argues:

Few people in 1830 believed that an Italian nation might even exist. There were eight states in the peninsula, each with distinct laws and traditions. No one had had the desire or the resources to revive Napoleon's partial experiment in unification. The settlement of 1814–15 had merely restored regional divisions, with the added disadvantage that the decisive victory of Austria over France temporarily hindered Italians in playing off their former oppressors against each other. ... Italians who, like Ugo Foscolo and Gabriele Rossetti, harboured patriotic sentiments, were driven into exile. The largest Italian state, the Bourbon Kingdom of the Two Sicilies, with its 8 million inhabitants, seemed aloof and indifferent: Sicily and Naples had once been ruled by Spain, and it had always been foreign to the rest of Italy. The common people in each region, and even the intellectual elite, spoke their mutually unintelligible dialects, and lacked the least vestiges of national consciousness. They wanted good government, not self-government, and had welcomed Napoleon and the French as more equitable and efficient than their native dynasties, many of which had died out in the 18th century.

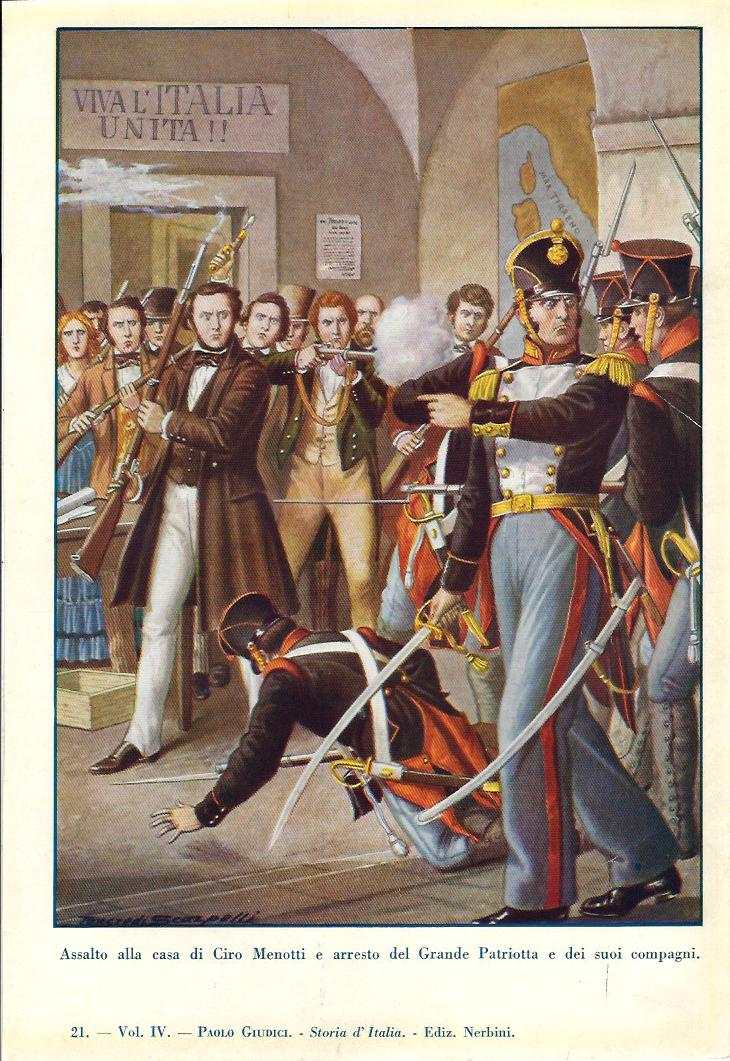
Ciro Menotti and his compatriots clashed with the army.

After 1830, revolutionary sentiment in favour of a unified Italy began to experience a resurgence, and a series of insurrections laid the groundwork for the creation of one nation along the Italian peninsula.

The Duke of Modena, Francis IV, was an ambitious man, and he hoped to become king of northern Italy by increasing his territory. In 1826, Francis made it clear that he would not act against those who subverted opposition toward the unification of Italy. Encouraged by the declaration, revolutionaries in the region began to organize.

During the July Revolution of 1830 in France, revolutionaries forced King Charles X to abdicate and created the July Monarchy with encouragement from the new French king, Louis-Philippe I. Louis-Philippe had promised revolutionaries such as Ciro Menotti that he would intervene if Austria tried to interfere in Italy with troops. Fearing he would lose his throne, Louis-Philippe did not, however, intervene in Menotti's planned uprising. The Duke of Modena abandoned his Carbonari supporters, arrested Menotti and other conspirators in 1831, and once again conquered his duchy with help from the Austrian troops. Menotti was executed, and the idea of a revolution centred in Modena faded.

At the same time, other insurrections arose in the Papal Legations of Bologna, Ferrara, Ravenna, Forlì, Ancona and Perugia. These successful revolutions, which adopted the tricolore in place of the Papal flag, quickly spread to cover all the Papal Legations, and their newly installed local governments proclaimed the creation of a united Italian nation. The revolts in Modena and the Papal Legations inspired similar activity in the Duchy of Parma, where the tricolore flag was adopted. The Parmese duchess Marie Louise left the city during the political upheaval.

Insurrection provinces planned to unite as the Italian United Provinces, which prompted Pope Gregory XVI to ask for Austrian help against the rebels. Austrian Chancellor Klemens von Metternich warned Louis-Philippe that Austria had no intention of letting Italian matters be and that French intervention would not be tolerated. Louis-Philippe sent a naval expedition to Ancona, which restored Papal authority there and even arrested Italian patriots living in France. In early 1831, the Austrian army began its march across the Italian peninsula, slowly crushing resistance in each province that had revolted. This military action suppressed much of the fledgling revolutionary movement.

== Revolutions of 1848–1849 and First Italian War of Independence ==
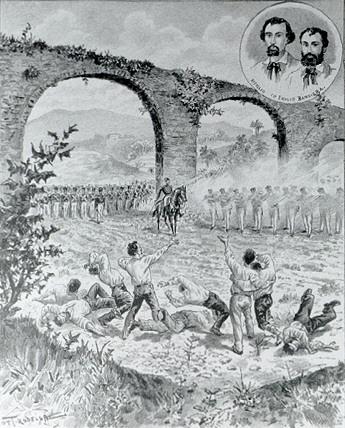
Execution of the Bandiera Brothers

In 1844, two brothers from Venice, Attilio and Emilio Bandiera, members of Young Italy, planned to make a raid on the Calabrian coast against the Kingdom of Two Sicilies in support of Italian unification. They assembled a band of about twenty men ready to sacrifice their lives and set sail on their venture on 12 June 1844. Four days later they landed near Crotone, intending to go to Cosenza, liberate the political prisoners, and issue their proclamations. Tragically for the Bandiera brothers, they did not find the insurgent band they were told awaited them, so they moved towards La Sila. They were ultimately betrayed by one of their party, the Corsican Pietro Boccheciampe, and by some peasants who believed them to be Turkish pirates. A detachment of gendarmes and volunteers were sent against them, and after a short fight, the whole band was taken prisoner and escorted to Cosenza, where a number of Calabrians who had taken part in a previous rising were also under arrest. The Bandiera brothers and their nine companions were executed by firing squad; some accounts state they cried "Viva l'Italia!" ('Long live Italy!') as they fell. The moral effect was enormous throughout Italy, the action of the authorities was universally condemned, and the martyrdom of the Bandiera brothers bore fruit in the subsequent revolutions.

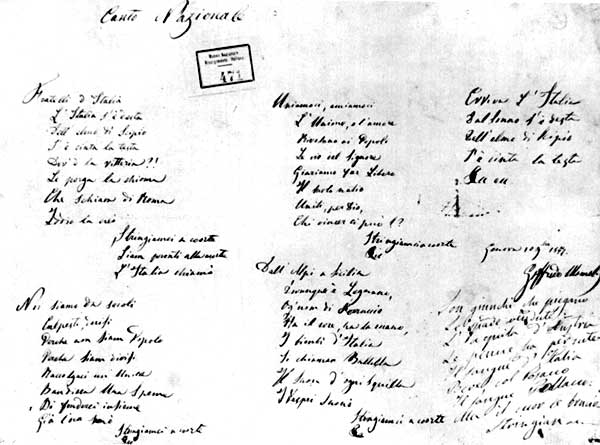
Holographic copy of 1847 of Il Canto degli Italiani, the Italian national anthem since 1946

In this context, in 1847, the first public performance of the song Il Canto degli Italiani, the Italian national anthem since 1946, took place. Il Canto degli Italiani, written by Goffredo Mameli set to music by Michele Novaro, is also known as the Inno di Mameli, after the author of the lyrics, or Fratelli d'Italia, from its opening line.

On 5 January 1848, the revolutionary disturbances began with a civil disobedience strike in Lombardy, as citizens stopped smoking cigars and playing the lottery, which denied Austria the associated tax revenue. Shortly after this, revolts began on the island of Sicily and in Naples. In Sicily the revolt resulted in the proclamation of the Kingdom of Sicily with Ruggero Settimo as chairman of the independent state until 1849, when the Bourbon army took back full control of the island on 15 May 1849 by force.

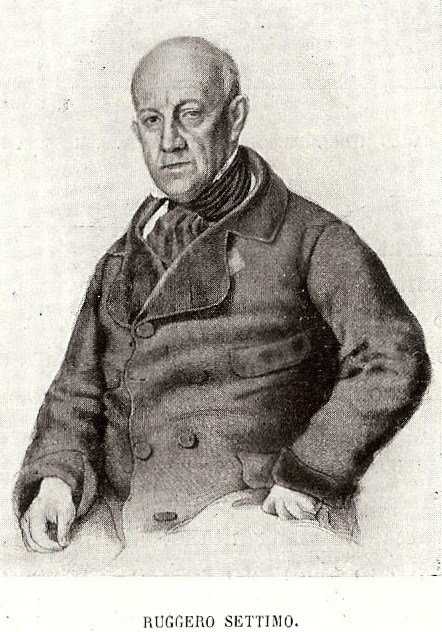
Ruggero Settimo

In February 1848, there were revolts in Tuscany that were relatively nonviolent, after which Grand Duke Leopold II granted the Tuscans a constitution. A breakaway republican provisional government formed in Tuscany during February shortly after this concession. On 21 February, Pope Pius IX granted a constitution to the Papal States, which was both unexpected and surprising considering the historical recalcitrance of the Papacy. On 23 February 1848, King Louis Philippe of France was forced to flee Paris, and the Second French Republic was proclaimed. By the time the revolution in Paris occurred, three states of Italy had constitutions—four if one considers Sicily to be a separate state.

Meanwhile, in Lombardy, tensions increased until the Milanese and Venetians rose in revolt on 18 March 1848. The insurrection in Milan succeeded in expelling the Austrian garrison after five days of street fights—18–22 March (Cinque giornate di Milano). An Austrian army under Marshal Josef Radetzky besieged Milan, but due to the defection of many of his troops and the support of the Milanese for the revolt, they were forced to retreat to the Quadrilatero fortresses.

Soon, Charles Albert, the King of Sardinia (who ruled Piedmont and Savoy), urged by the Venetians and Milanese to aid their cause, decided this was the moment to unify Italy and declared war on Austria (First Italian War of Independence). After initial successes at Goito and Peschiera, he was decisively defeated by Radetzky at the Battle of Custoza on 24 July. An armistice was agreed to, and Radetzky regained control of all of Lombardy–Venetia save Venice itself, where the Republic of San Marco was proclaimed under Daniele Manin.

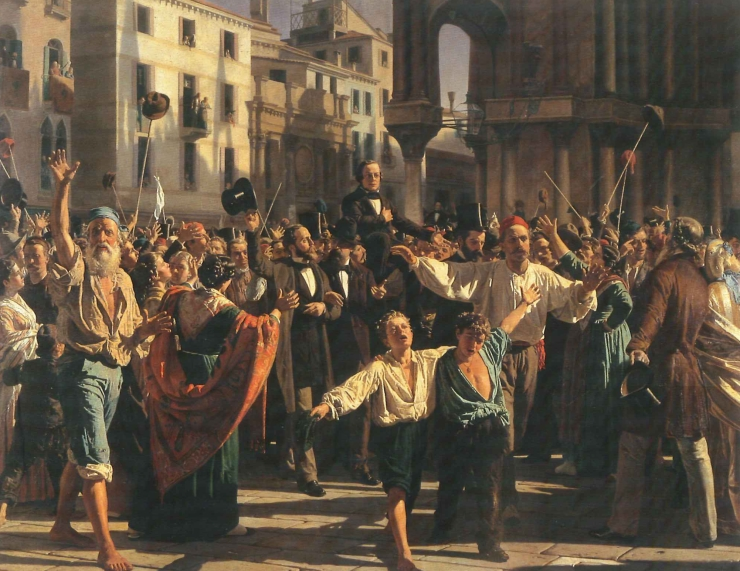
Daniele Manin and Niccolò Tommaseo after the proclamation of the Republic of San Marco

While Radetzky consolidated control of Lombardy–Venetia and Charles Albert licked his wounds, matters took a more serious turn in other parts of Italy. The monarchs who had reluctantly agreed to constitutions in March came into conflict with their constitutional ministers. At first, the republics had the upper hand, forcing the monarchs to flee their capitals, including Pope Pius IX.

Initially, Pius IX had been something of a reformer, but conflicts with the revolutionaries soured him on the idea of constitutional government. In November 1848, following the assassination of his Minister Pellegrino Rossi, Pius IX fled just before Giuseppe Garibaldi and other patriots arrived in Rome. In early 1849, elections were held for a Constituent Assembly, which proclaimed a Roman Republic on 9 February. On 2 February 1849, at a political rally held in the Tor di Nona, a young Roman priest, Carlo Arduini, had made a speech in which he had declared that the temporal power of the Holy See was a "historical lie, a political imposture, and a religious immorality". In early March 1849, Giuseppe Mazzini arrived in Rome and was appointed Chief Minister. In the Constitution of the Roman Republic, religious freedom was guaranteed by article 7, the independence of the pope as head of the Catholic Church was guaranteed by article 8 of the Principi fondamentali, while the death penalty was abolished by article 5, and free public education was provided by article 8 of the Titolo I.

Before the powers could respond to the founding of the Roman Republic, Charles Albert, whose army had been trained by the exiled Polish general Albert Chrzanowski, renewed the war with Austria. He was quickly defeated by Radetzky at Novara on 23 March 1849. Charles Albert abdicated in favour of his son, Victor Emmanuel II, and Piedmontese ambitions to unite Italy or conquer Lombardy were, for the moment, brought to an end. The war ended with a treaty signed on 9 August. A popular revolt broke out in Brescia on the same day as the defeat at Novara, but was suppressed by the Austrians ten days later.

There remained the Roman and Venetian Republics. In April, a French force under Charles Oudinot was sent to Rome. Apparently, the French first wished to mediate between the pope and his subjects, but soon the French were determined to restore the pope. After a two-month siege, Rome capitulated on 29 June 1849 and the pope was restored. Garibaldi and Mazzini once again fled into exile—in 1850 Garibaldi went to New York City. Meanwhile, the Austrians besieged Venice, which was defended by a volunteer army led by Daniele Manin and Guglielmo Pepe, who were forced to surrender on 24 August. Pro-independence fighters were hanged en masse in Belfiore, while the Austrians moved to restore order in central Italy, restoring the princes who had been expelled and re-establishing Papal control over the Legations. The revolutions were thus completely crushed.

=== Cavour and prospects for unification ===
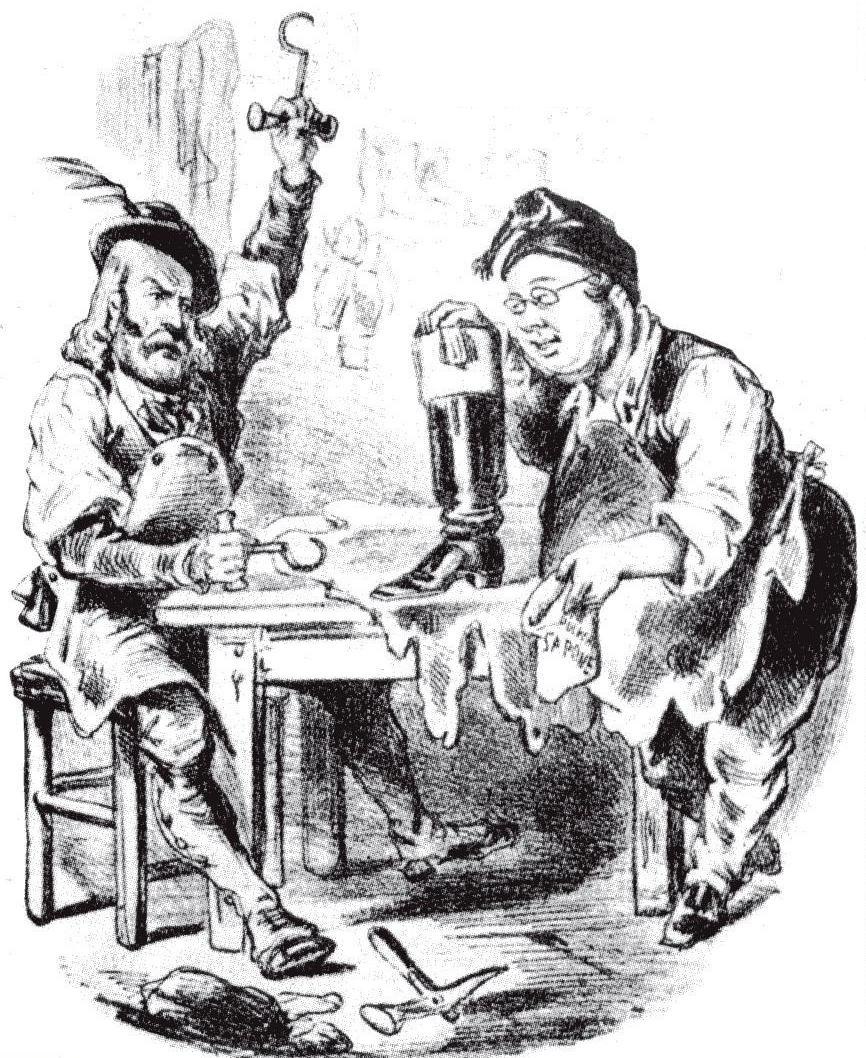
Garibaldi and Cavour making Italy in a satirical cartoon of 1861

Morale was of course badly weakened, but the dream of Risorgimento did not die. Instead, the Italian patriots learned some lessons that made them much more effective at the next opportunity in 1860. Military weakness was glaring, as the small Italian states were completely outmatched by France and Austria.

France was a potential ally, and the patriots realized they had to focus all their attention on expelling Austria first, with a willingness to give the French whatever they wanted in return for essential military intervention. As a result of this France received Nice and Savoy in 1860. Secondly, the patriots realized that the pope was an enemy, and could never be the leader of a united Italy. Thirdly, they realized that republicanism was too weak a force. Unification had to be based on a strong monarchy, and in practice that meant reliance on Piedmont (the Kingdom of Sardinia) under King Victor Emmanuel II (1820–1878) of the House of Savoy.

Camillo Benso, Count of Cavour (1810–1861) provided critical leadership. He was a modernizer interested in agrarian improvements, banks, railways and free trade. He opened a newspaper as soon as censorship allowed it: Il Risorgimento called for the independence of Italy, a league of Italian princes, and moderate reforms. He had the ear of the king and in 1852 became prime minister. He ran an efficient active government, promoting rapid economic modernization while upgrading the administration of the army and the financial and legal systems. He sought out support from patriots across Italy.

In 1855, the kingdom became an ally of Britain and France in the Crimean War, which gave Cavour's diplomacy legitimacy in the eyes of the great powers.

== Towards the Kingdom of Italy ==
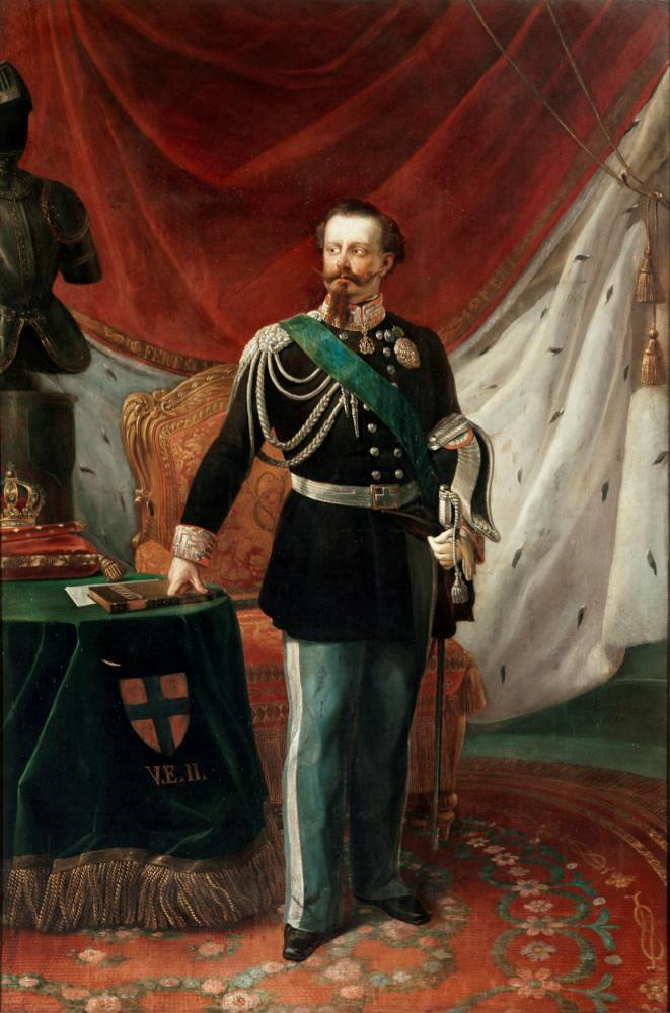
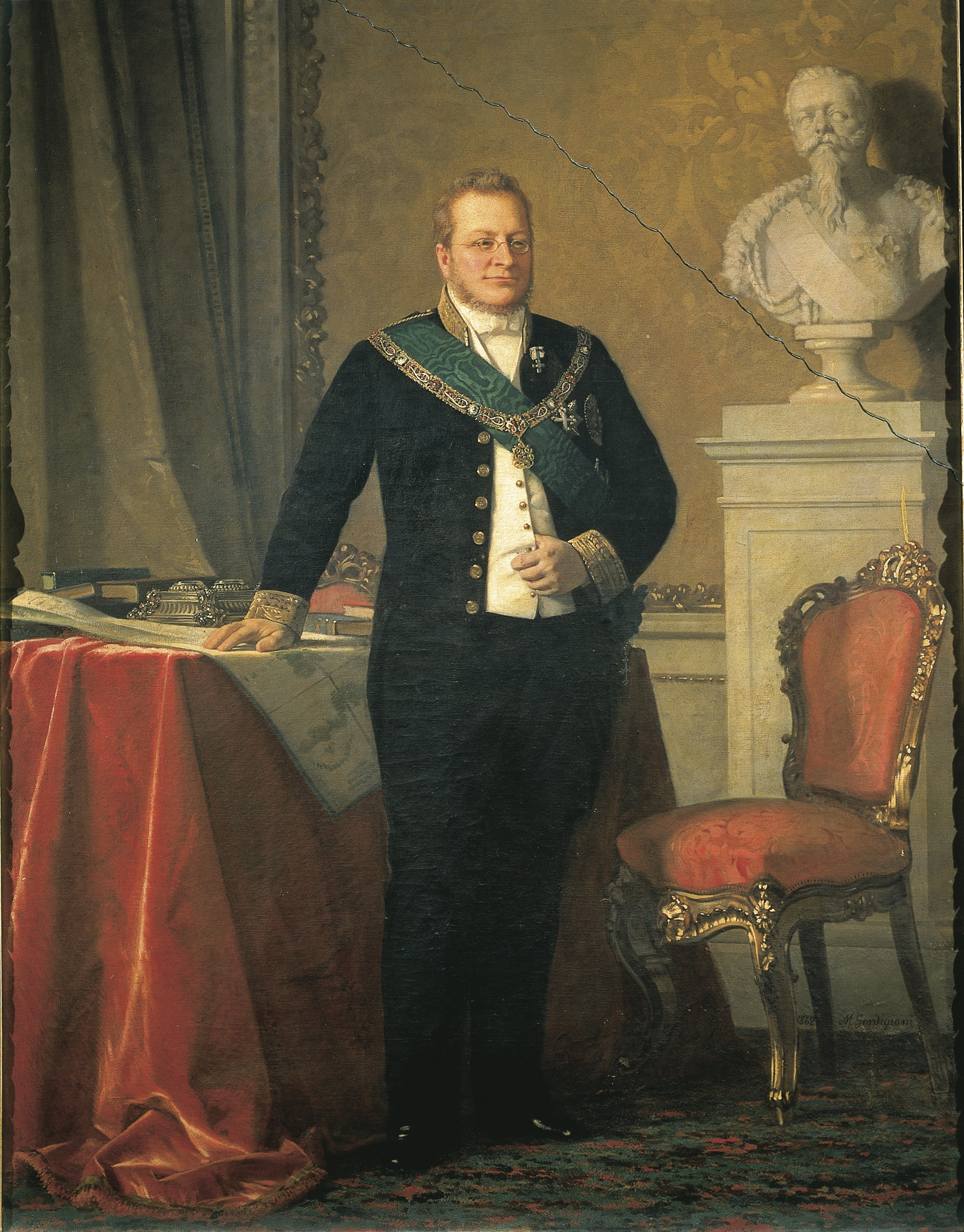
Victor Emmanuel II (left) and Camillo Benso, Count of Cavour (right), leading figures in the Italian unification, became respectively the first king and first Prime Minister of unified Italy.

=== Pisacane fiasco ===
In 1857, Carlo Pisacane, an aristocrat from Naples who had embraced Mazzini's ideas, decided to provoke a rising in the Kingdom of the Two Sicilies. His small force landed on the island of Ponza. It overpowered guards and liberated hundreds of prisoners. In sharp contrast to his hypothetical expectations, there was no local uprising and the invaders were quickly overpowered. Pisacane was killed by angry locals who suspected he was leading a Romani band trying to steal their food.

=== Second Italian Independence War of 1859 and aftermath ===
The Second War of Italian Independence began in April 1859 when the Sardinian Prime Minister Count Cavour found an ally in Napoleon III. Napoleon III signed a secret alliance and Cavour provoked Austria with military maneuvers and eventually led to the war in April 1859. Cavour called for volunteers to enlist in the Italian liberation. The Austrians planned to use their army to beat the Sardinians before the French could come to their aid. Austria had an army of 140,000 men, while the Sardinians had a mere 70,000 men by comparison. However, the Austrians' numerical strength was outweighed by an ineffectual leadership appointed by the Emperor on the basis of noble lineage, rather than military competency. Their army was slow to enter Piedmont, taking almost ten days to travel the 80 kilometres (50 mi) to Turin. By this time, the French had reinforced the Sardinians, so the Austrians retreated.

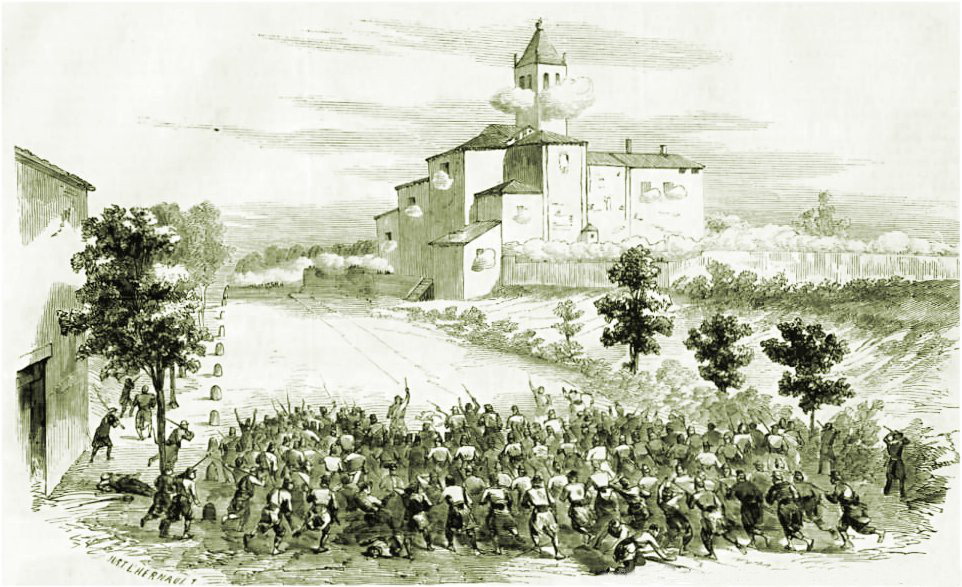
Battle of San Fermo

The Austrians were defeated at the Battle of Magenta on 4 June and pushed back to Lombardy. Napoleon III's plans worked and at the Battle of Solferino, France and Sardinia defeated Austria and forced negotiations; at the same time, in the northern part of Lombardy, the Italian volunteers known as the Hunters of the Alps, led by Giuseppe Garibaldi, defeated the Austrians at Varese and Como. On 12 July, the Armistice of Villafranca was signed. The settlement, by which Lombardy was annexed to Sardinia, left Austria in control of the Veneto and Mantua. The final arrangement was ironed out by "back-room" deals. This was because neither France, Austria, nor Sardinia wanted to risk another battle and could not handle further fighting. All of the sides were eventually unhappy with the outcome of the Second War of Italian Unification and expected another conflict in the future. In fact, Napoleon III and Cavour were mutually indebted: the first because he had withdrawn from the Second Italian War of Independence before the expected conquest of Venice, the second because he had allowed the uprisings to spread to the territories of central-northern Italy, thus going beyond what was agreed with the Plombières Agreement.

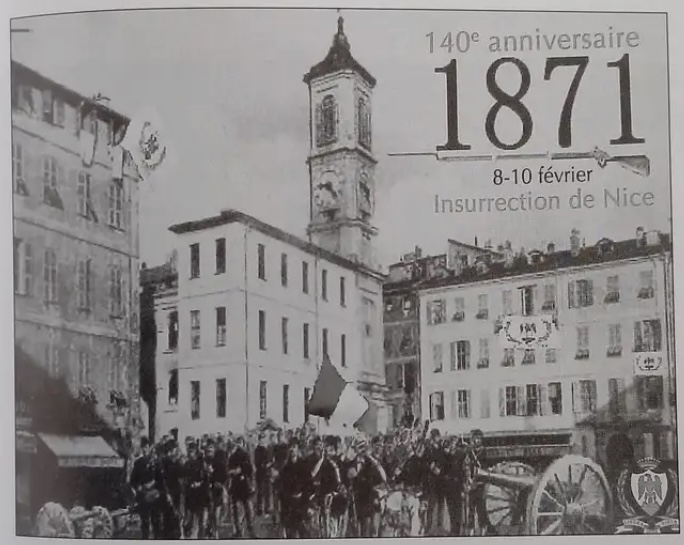
Pro-Italian protests in Nice, 1871, during the Niçard Vespers

Sardinia annexed Lombardy from Austria; it later occupied and annexed the United Provinces of Central Italy, consisting of the Grand Duchy of Tuscany, the Duchy of Parma, the Duchy of Modena and Reggio and the Papal Legations on 22 March 1860. Sardinia handed Savoy and Nice over to France at the Treaty of Turin, a decision that was the consequence of the Plombières Agreement, on 24 March 1860, an event that caused the Niçard exodus, which was the emigration of a quarter of the Niçard Italians to Italy.

Giuseppe Garibaldi was elected in 1871 in Nice at the National Assembly where he tried to promote the annexation of his hometown to the newborn Italian unitary state, but he was prevented from speaking. Because of this denial, between 1871 and 1872 there were riots in Nice, promoted by the Garibaldini and called "Niçard Vespers", which demanded the annexation of the city and its area to Italy. Fifteen Nice people who participated in the rebellion were tried and sentenced.

=== Expedition of the Thousand ===
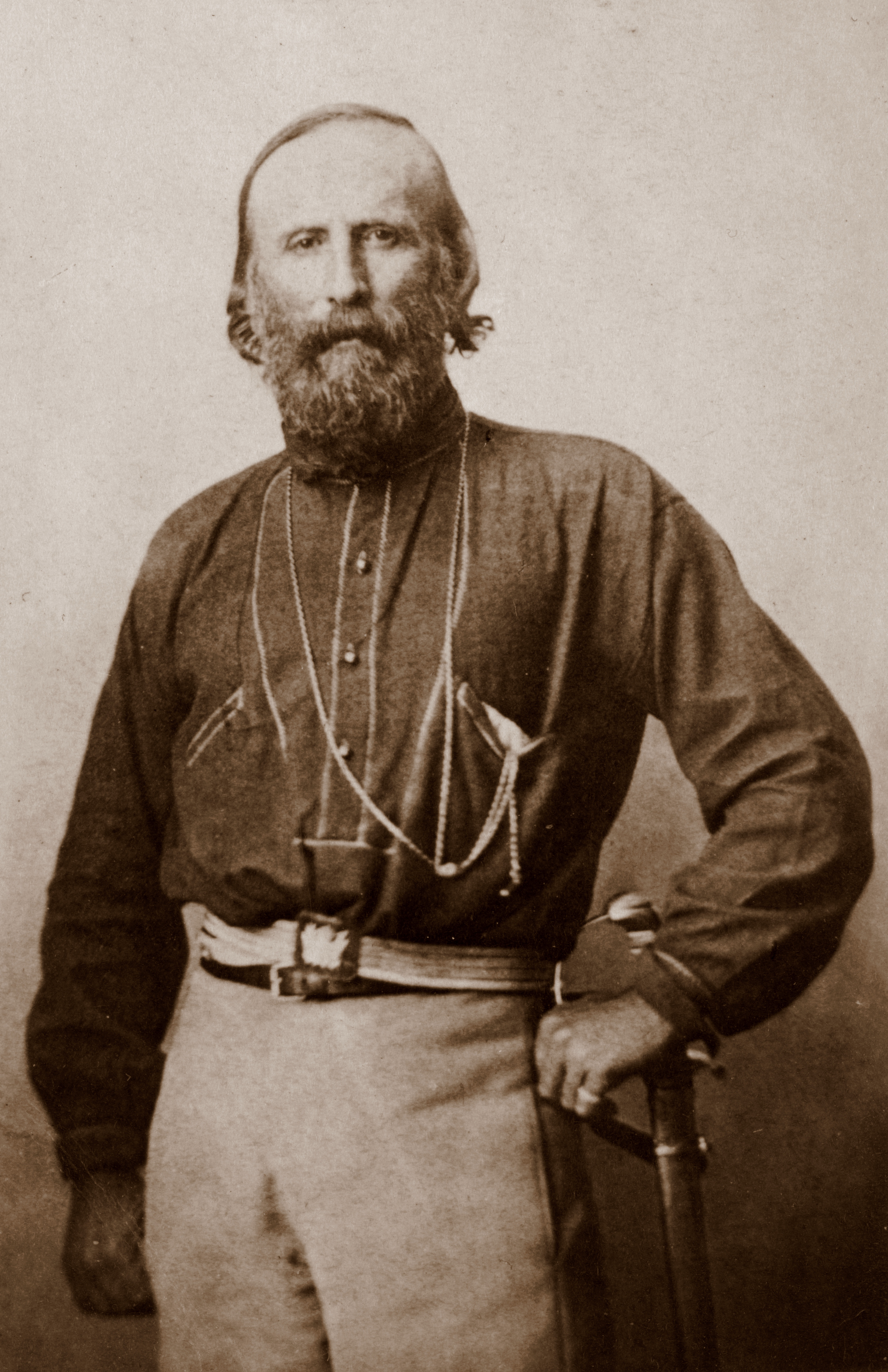
Giuseppe Garibaldi, celebrated as one of the greatest generals of modern times and as the "Hero of the Two Worlds" because of his military enterprises in South America and Europe, who commanded and fought in many military campaigns that led to the unification of Italy

Thus, by early 1860, only five states remained in Italy—the Austrians in Venetia, the Papal States (now minus the Legations), the new expanded Kingdom of Piedmont-Sardinia, the Kingdom of the Two Sicilies, and San Marino.

Francis II of the Two Sicilies, the son and successor of Ferdinand II (the infamous "King Bomba"), had a well-organized army of 150,000 men. But his father's tyranny had inspired many secret societies, and the kingdom's Swiss mercenaries were unexpectedly recalled home under the terms of a new Swiss law that forbade Swiss citizens to serve as mercenaries. This left Francis with only his mostly unreliable native troops. It was a critical opportunity for the unification movement. In April 1860, separate insurrections began in Messina and Palermo in Sicily, both of which had demonstrated a history of opposing Neapolitan rule. These rebellions were easily suppressed by loyal troops.

In the meantime, Giuseppe Garibaldi, a native of Nice, was deeply resentful of the French annexation of his home city. He hoped to use his supporters to regain the territory. Cavour, terrified of Garibaldi provoking a war with France, persuaded Garibaldi to instead use his forces in the Sicilian rebellions. On 6 May 1860, Garibaldi and his cadre of about a thousand Italian volunteers (called I Mille), steamed from Quarto near Genoa, and, after a stop in Talamone on 11 May, landed near Marsala on the west coast of Sicily.

Near Salemi, Garibaldi's army attracted scattered bands of rebels, and the combined forces defeated the Army of the Two Sicilies at the Battle of Calatafimi on 13 May. Within three days, the invading force had swelled to 4,000 men. On 14 May Garibaldi proclaimed himself dictator of Sicily, in the name of Victor Emmanuel. After waging various successful but hard-fought battles, Garibaldi advanced upon the Sicilian capital of Palermo, announcing his arrival by beacon-fires kindled at night. On 27 May the force began the Siege of Palermo, while a mass uprising of street and barricade fighting broke out within the city.

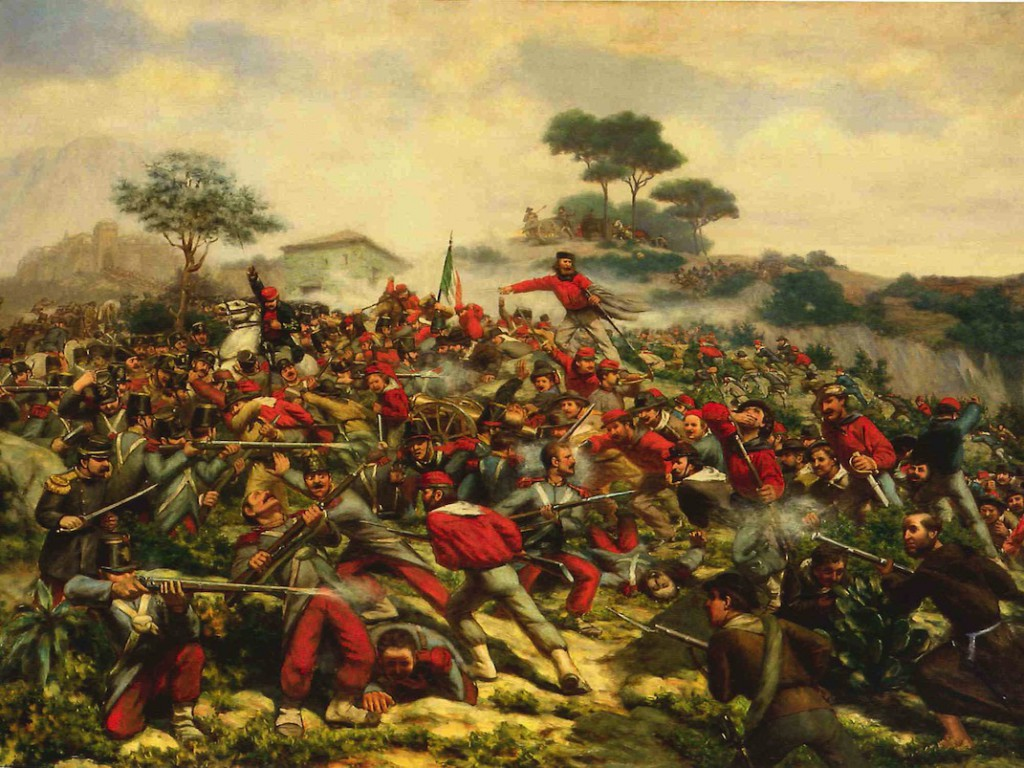
Battle of Calatafimi

With Palermo deemed insurgent, Neapolitan general Ferdinando Lanza, arriving in Sicily with some 25,000 troops, furiously bombarded Palermo nearly to ruins. With the intervention of a British admiral, an armistice was declared, leading to the Neapolitan troops' departure and surrender of the town to Garibaldi and his much smaller army.

This resounding success demonstrated the weakness of the Neapolitan government. Garibaldi's fame spread and many Italians began to consider him a national hero. Doubt, confusion, and dismay overtook the Neapolitan court—the king hastily summoned his ministry and offered to restore an earlier constitution, but these efforts failed to rebuild the people's trust in Bourbon governance.

Six weeks after the surrender of Palermo, Garibaldi attacked Messina. Within a week, its citadel surrendered. Having conquered Sicily, Garibaldi proceeded to the mainland, crossing the Strait of Messina with the Neapolitan fleet at hand. The garrison at Reggio Calabria promptly surrendered. As he marched northward, the populace everywhere hailed him, and military resistance faded: on 18 and 21 August, the people of Basilicata and Apulia, two regions of the Kingdom of the Two Sicilies, independently declared their annexation to the Kingdom of Italy. At the end of August, Garibaldi was at Cosenza, and, on 5 September, at Eboli, near Salerno. Meanwhile, Naples had declared a state of siege, and on 6 September the king gathered the 4,000 troops still faithful to him and retreated over the River Volturno. The next day, Garibaldi, with a few followers, entered by train into Naples, where the people openly welcomed him.

=== Defeat of the Kingdom of the Two Sicilies ===
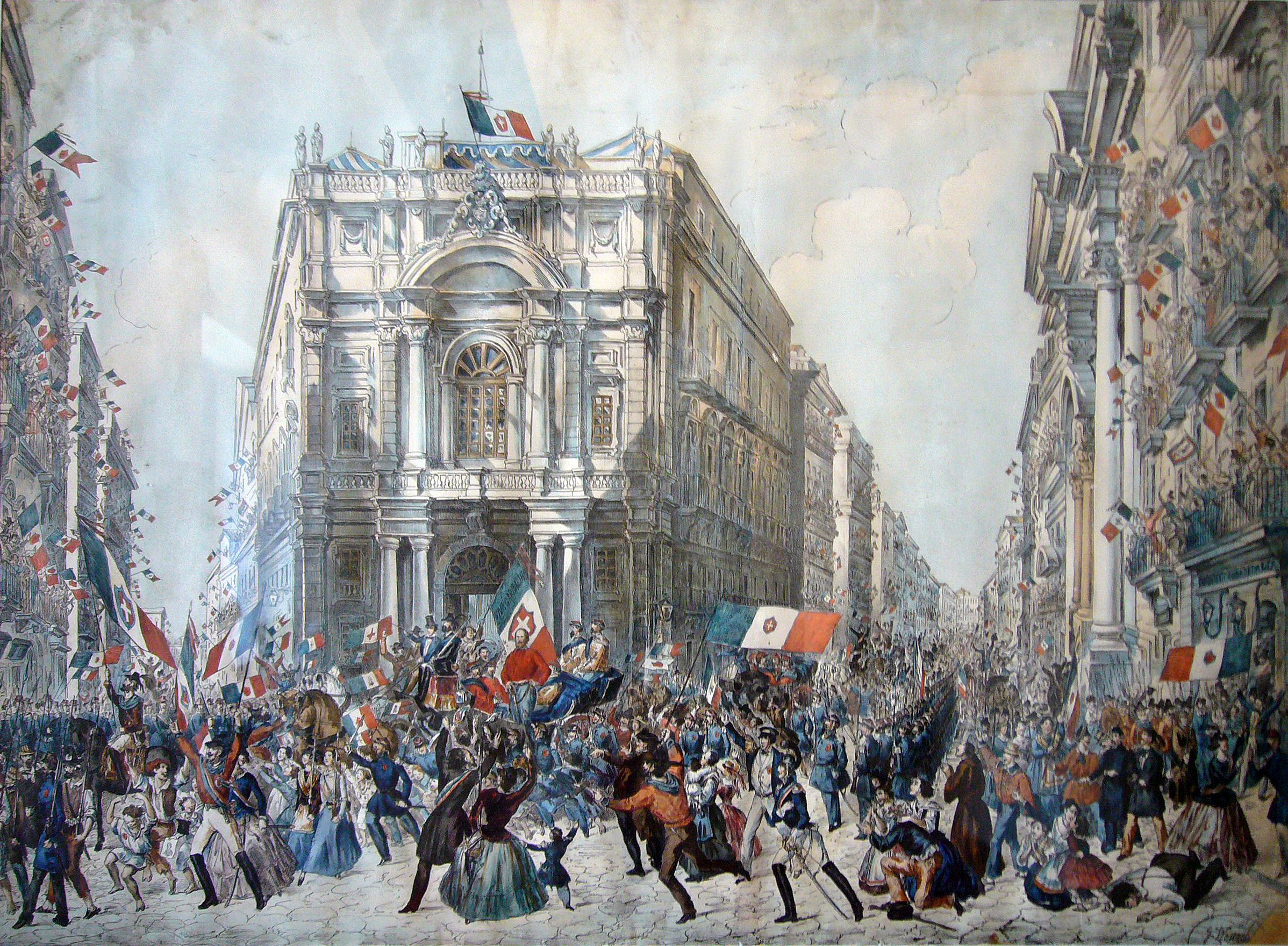
People cheering as Garibaldi enters Naples

Although Garibaldi had easily taken the capital, the Neapolitan army had not joined the rebellion en masse, holding firm along the River Volturno. Garibaldi's irregular bands of about 25,000 men could not drive away the king or take the fortresses of Capua and Gaeta without the help of the Royal Sardinian Army. The Sardinian army, however, could only arrive by traversing the Papal States, which extended across the entire center of the peninsula. Ignoring the political will of the Holy See, Garibaldi announced his intent to proclaim a "Kingdom of Italy" from Rome, the capital city of Pope Pius IX. Seeing this as a threat to the domain of the Catholic Church, Pius threatened excommunication for those who supported such an effort. Afraid that Garibaldi would attack Rome, Catholics worldwide sent money and volunteers for the Papal Army, which was commanded by General Louis Lamoricière, a French exile.

The settling of the peninsular standoff now rested with Napoleon III. If he let Garibaldi have his way, Garibaldi would probably end the temporal sovereignty of the pope and make Rome the capital of Italy. Napoleon, however, may have arranged with Cavour to let the King of Sardinia free to take possession of Naples, Umbria and the other provinces, provided that Rome and the "Patrimony of Saint Peter" were left intact.

It was in this situation that a Sardinian force of two army corps, under generals Manfredo Fanti and Enrico Cialdini, marched to the frontier of the Papal States, its objective being not Rome but Naples. The Papal troops under Lamoricière advanced against Cialdini, but were quickly defeated at the Battle of Castelfidardo and besieged in the fortress of Ancona, finally surrendering on 29 September. On 9 October, Victor Emmanuel arrived and took command. There was no longer a Papal army to oppose him, and the march southward proceeded unopposed.

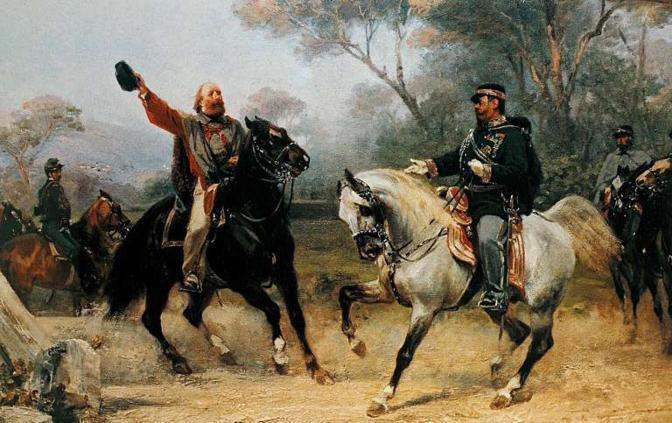
Victor Emmanuel meets Garibaldi near Teano.

Garibaldi distrusted the pragmatic Cavour since Cavour was the man ultimately responsible for orchestrating the French annexation of the city of Nice, which was his birthplace. Nevertheless, he accepted the command of Victor Emmanuel. When the king entered Sessa Aurunca at the head of his army, Garibaldi willingly handed over his dictatorial power. After greeting Victor Emmanuel in Teano with the title of King of Italy, Garibaldi entered Naples riding beside the king. Garibaldi then retired to the island of Caprera, while the remaining work of unifying the peninsula was left to Victor Emmanuel.

The progress of the Sardinian army compelled Francis II to give up his line along the river, and he eventually took refuge with his best troops in the fortress of Gaeta. His courage boosted by his resolute young wife, Queen Marie Sophie, Francis mounted a stubborn defence that lasted three months. But European allies refused to provide him with aid, food and munitions became scarce, and disease set in, so the garrison was forced to surrender. Nonetheless, ragtag groups of Neapolitans loyal to Francis fought on against the Italian government for years to come.

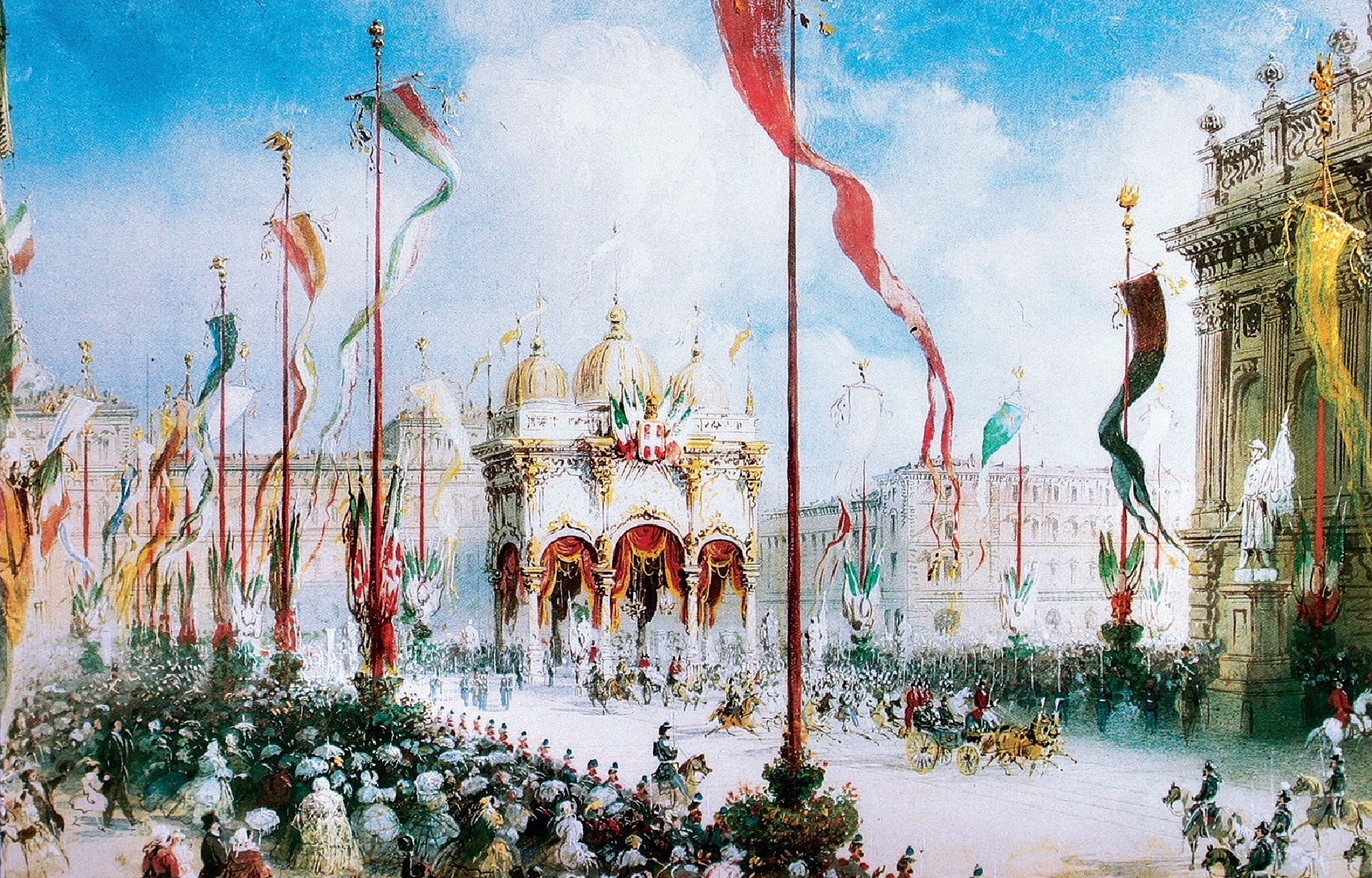
Carlo Bossoli: the royal procession at the opening of the Parliament of the Kingdom of Italy

The fall of Gaeta brought the unification movement to the brink of fruition—only Lazio and Venetia remained to be added. On 18 February 1861, Victor Emmanuel assembled the deputies of the first Italian Parliament in Turin. On 17 March 1861, the Parliament proclaimed Victor Emmanuel King of Italy, and on 27 March 1861 Rome was declared capital of Italy, although it was not yet in the new kingdom.

Borrowing from the old Latin title Pater Patriae of the Roman emperors, the Italians gave to King Victor Emmanuel II the epithet of Father of the Fatherland (Italian: Padre della Patria). Three months later Cavour died, having seen his life's work nearly completed. When he was given the last rites, Cavour purportedly said: "Italy is made. All is safe."

=== The repercussions on diplomatic relations ===
Painting depicting the proclamation of the Kingdom of Italy in 1861

The disapproval of the various European states culminated in the direct participation of the Sardinian army in the Expedition of the Thousand. In reaction, Spain and the Russian Empire interrupted diplomatic relations with the Kingdom of Sardinia, while the Austrian Empire, which had not maintained relations with this country since 1859, after the Second Italian War of Independence, sent its troops to the Mincio border. France made no hostile statements, but recalled its ambassador. Queen Victoria and her prime minister John Russell convinced the Kingdom of Prussia not to hinder the ongoing process of Italian unification. On 26 October 1860, the same day as the meeting in Teano between the king and Garibaldi, Austria organized a congress in Warsaw to apply measures against the Kingdom of Sardinia, without success; held back by this crisis, Cavour was unable to be present at Teano.

After the creation of the Kingdom of Italy, the United Kingdom and the Swiss Confederation were the first to recognize the new state (30 March 1861), followed by the United States on 13 April. France negotiated the presence of French troops in Rome and recognized the Kingdom of Italy on 15 June, shortly after Cavour's death. It was then Portugal's turn on 27 June, followed by Greece, the Ottoman Empire and the Scandinavian countries. The recognition of the Netherlands and Belgium occurred in two phases: they recognized the new title of Victor Emmanuel II in July, then the kingdom in November, after a long clash between conservatives and liberals in the Belgian parliament over the latter.

=== Roman Question ===
Mazzini was discontented with the perpetuation of monarchical government and continued to agitate for a republic. With the motto "Free from the Alps to the Adriatic", the unification movement set its gaze on Rome and Venice. There were obstacles, however. A challenge against the pope's temporal dominion was viewed with profound distrust by Catholics around the world, and there were French troops stationed in Rome. Victor Emmanuel was wary of the international repercussions of attacking the Papal States, and discouraged his subjects from participating in revolutionary ventures with such intentions.

Nonetheless, Garibald believed that the government would support him if he attacked Rome. Frustrated at inaction by the king, and bristling over perceived snubs, he came out of retirement to organize a new venture. In June 1862, he sailed from Genoa and landed again at Palermo, where he gathered volunteers for the campaign, under the slogan o Roma o Morte ('either Rome or Death'). The garrison of Messina, loyal to the king's instructions, barred their passage to the mainland. Garibaldi's force, now numbering two thousand, turned south and set sail from Catania. Garibaldi declared that he would enter Rome as a victor or perish beneath its walls. He landed at Melito on 14 August and marched at once into the Calabrian mountains.

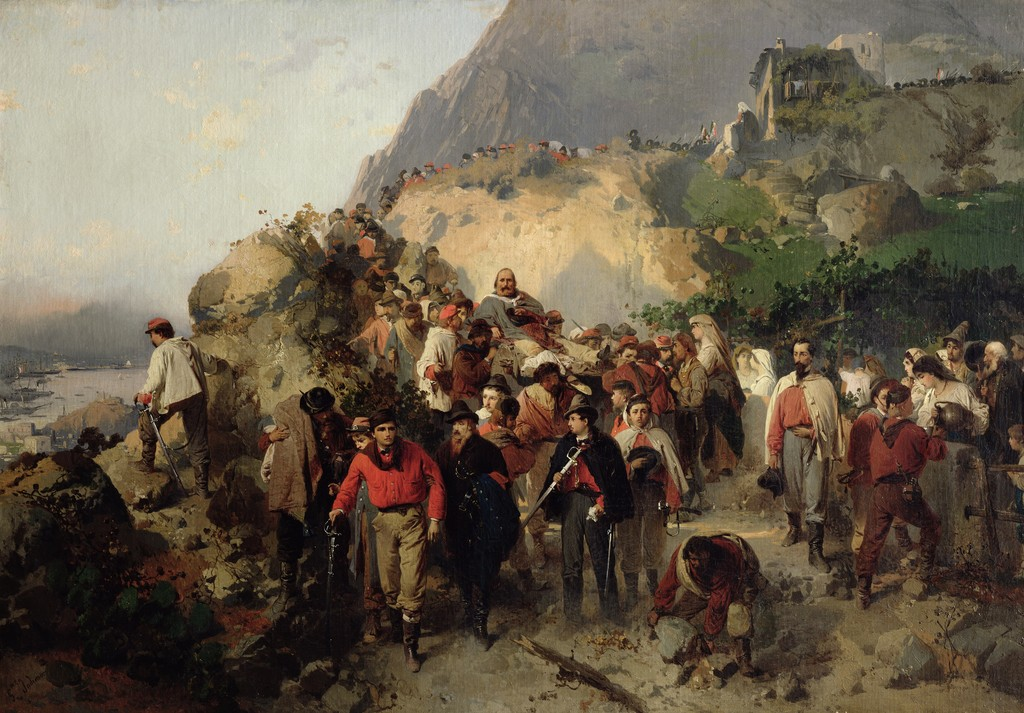
The Injured Garibaldi in the Aspromonte Mountains (oil on canvas), credited to Gerolamo Induno

Far from supporting this endeavour, the Italian government was quite disapproving. General Cialdini dispatched a division of the regular army, under Colonel Pallavicino, against the volunteer bands. On 28 August the two forces met at Aspromonte. One of the regulars fired a chance shot, and several volleys followed, but Garibaldi forbade his men to return fire on fellow subjects of the Kingdom of Italy. The volunteers suffered several casualties, and Garibaldi himself was wounded; many were taken prisoner. Garibaldi was taken by steamer to Varignano, where he was honorably imprisoned for a time, but finally released.

Meanwhile, Victor Emmanuel sought a safer means to the acquisition of the remaining Papal territory. He negotiated with the Emperor Napoleon for the removal of the French troops from Rome through a treaty. They agreed to the September Convention in September 1864, by which Napoleon agreed to withdraw the troops within two years. The pope was to expand his own army during that time so as to be self-sufficient. In December 1866, the last of the French troops departed from Rome, in spite of the efforts of the pope to retain them. By their withdrawal, Italy (excluding Venetia and Savoy) was freed from the presence of foreign soldiers.

The seat of government was moved in 1865 from Turin, the old Sardinian capital, to Florence. This arrangement created such disturbances in Turin that the king was forced to leave that city hastily for his new capital.

== Third War of Independence (1866) ==
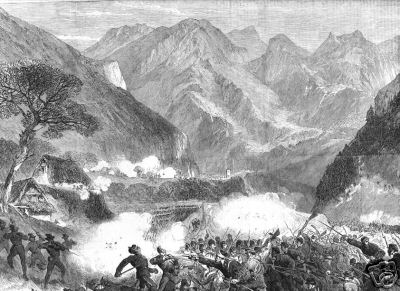
Battle of Bezzecca

In the Austro-Prussian War of 1866, Austria contested with Prussia the position of leadership among the German states. The Kingdom of Italy seized the opportunity to capture Venetia from Austrian rule and allied itself with Prussia. Austria tried to persuade the Italian government to accept Venetia in exchange for non-intervention. However, on 8 April, Italy and Prussia signed an agreement that supported Italy's acquisition of Venetia, and on 20 June Italy issued a declaration of war on Austria. Within the context of Italian unification, the Austro-Prussian war is called the Third Independence War, after the First (1848) and the Second (1859).

Victor Emmanuel hastened to lead an army across the Mincio to the invasion of Venetia, while Garibaldi was to invade the Tyrol with his Hunters of the Alps. The Italian army encountered the Austrians at Custoza on 24 June and suffered a defeat. On 20 July the Regia Marina was defeated in the Battle of Lissa. The following day, Garibaldi's volunteers defeated an Austrian force in the Battle of Bezzecca, and moved toward Trento.

Meanwhile, Prussian Minister President Otto von Bismarck saw that his own ends in the war had been achieved, and signed an armistice with Austria on 27 July. Italy followed, officially laying down its arms on 12 August. Garibaldi was recalled from his successful march and resigned with a brief telegram reading only "Obbedisco" ('I obey').

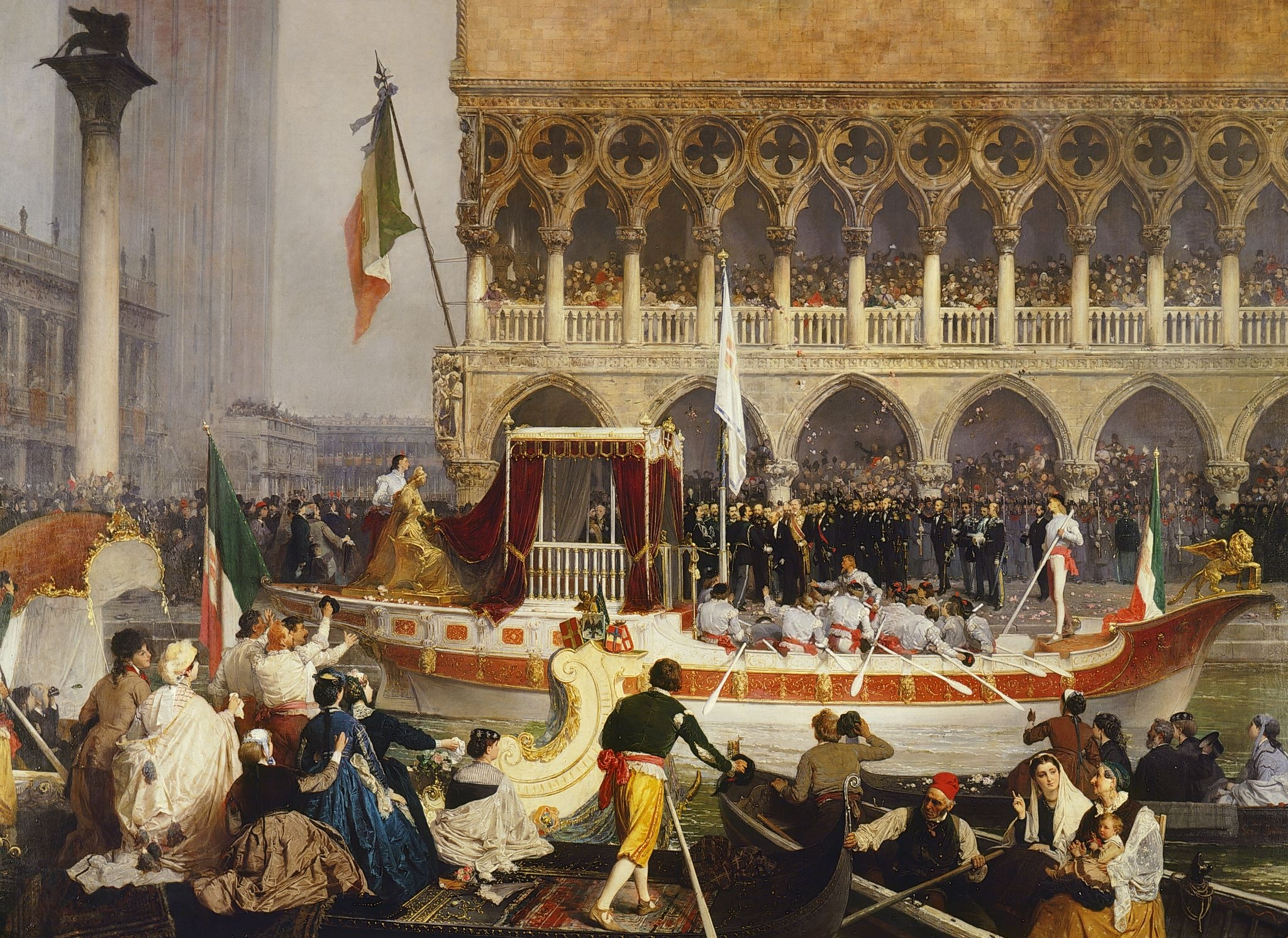
Victor Emmanuel II in Venice

Prussia's success on the northern front obliged Austria to cede Venetia (present-day Veneto and parts of Friuli) and the city of Mantua (the last remnant of the Quadrilatero). Under the terms of a peace treaty signed in Vienna on 12 October, Emperor Franz Joseph had already agreed to cede Venetia to Napoleon III in exchange for non-intervention in the Austro-Prussian War, and thus Napoleon ceded Venetia to Italy on 19 October, in exchange for the earlier Italian acquiescence to the French annexation of Savoy and Nice.

In the Treaty of Vienna, it was written that the annexation of Venetia would have become effective only after a referendum—taken on 21 and 22 October—to let the Venetian people express their will about being annexed or not to the Kingdom of Italy. Historians suggest that the referendum in Venetia was held under military pressure, as a mere 0.01% of voters (69 out of more than 642,000 ballots) voted against the annexation.

Austrian forces put up some opposition to the invading Italians, to little effect. Victor Emmanuel entered Venice and Venetian land, and performed an act of homage in the Piazza San Marco.

== Rome ==
=== Mentana and Villa Glori ===
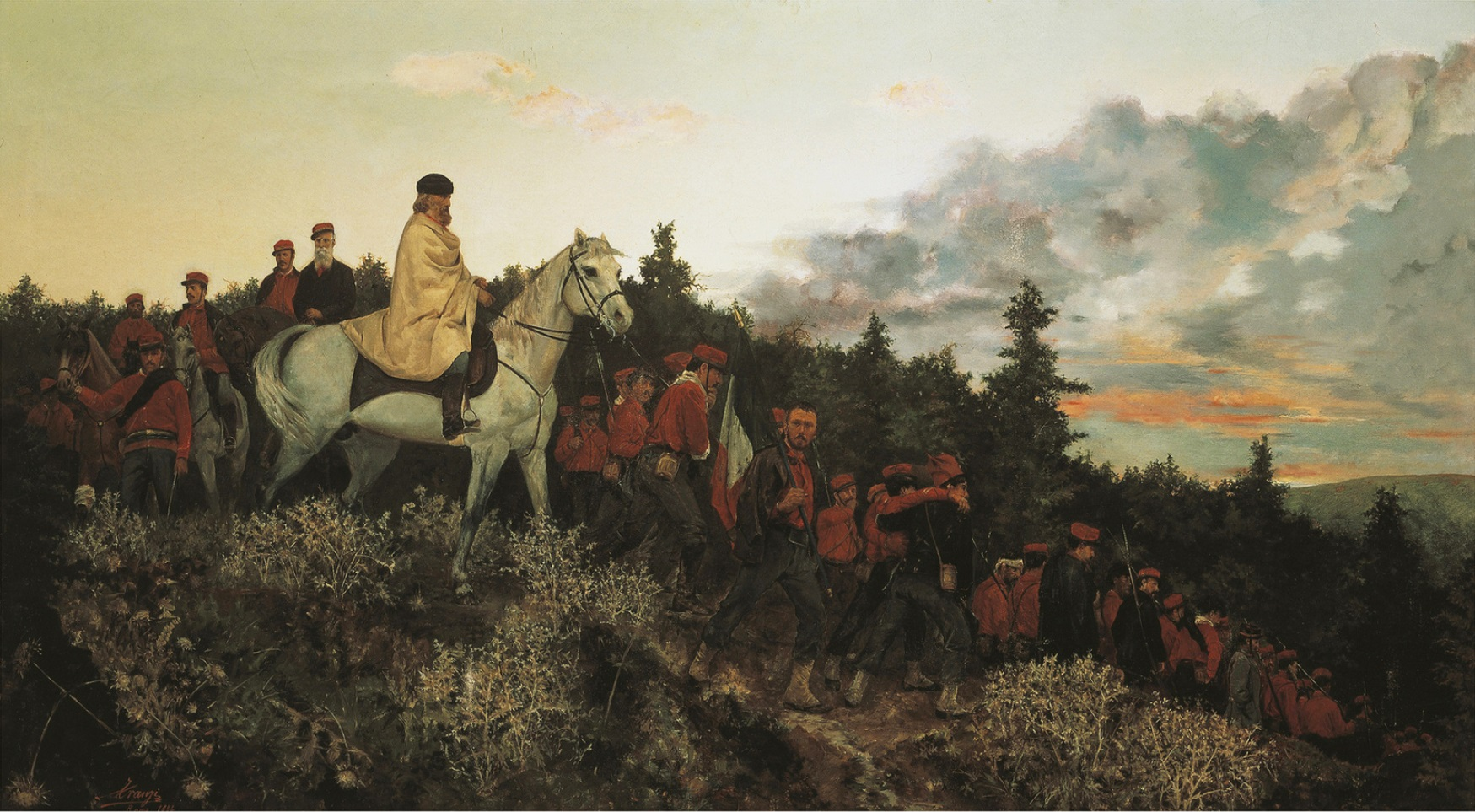
Garibaldi at Mentana, 3 November 1867

The national party, with Garibaldi at its head, still aimed at the possession of Rome, as the historic capital of the peninsula. In 1867 Garibaldi made a second attempt to capture Rome, but the Papal army, strengthened with a new French auxiliary force, defeated his poorly armed volunteers at Mentana. Subsequently, a French garrison remained in Civitavecchia until August 1870, when it was recalled following the outbreak of the Franco-Prussian War.

Before the defeat at Mentana on 3 November 1867, Enrico Cairoli, his brother Giovanni, and 70 companions had made a daring attempt to take Rome. The group had embarked in Terni and floated down the Tiber. Their arrival in Rome was to coincide with an uprising inside the city. On 22 October 1867, the revolutionaries inside Rome seized control of the Capitoline Hill and of Piazza Colonna. Unfortunately for the Cairoli and their companions, by the time they arrived at Villa Glori, on the northern outskirts of Rome, the uprising had already been suppressed. During the night of 22 October 1867, the group was surrounded by Papal Zouaves, and Giovanni was severely wounded. Enrico was mortally wounded and bled to death in Giovanni's arms.

With Cairoli dead, command was assumed by Giovanni Tabacchi who had retreated with the remaining volunteers into the villa, where they continued to fire at the papal soldiers. These also retreated in the evening to Rome. The survivors retreated to the positions of those led by Garibaldi on the Italian border.

=== Memorial ===
At the summit of Villa Glori, near the spot where Enrico died, there is a plain white column dedicated to the Cairoli brothers and their 70 companions. About 200 metres to the right from the Terrazza del Pincio, there is a bronze monument of Giovanni holding the dying Enrico in his arm. A plaque lists the names of their companions. Giovanni never recovered from his wounds and from the tragic events of 1867. According to an eyewitness, when Giovanni died on 11 September 1869:

In the last moments, he had a vision of Garibaldi and seemed to greet him with enthusiasm. I heard (so says a friend who was present) him say three times: "The union of the French to the papal political supporters was the terrible fact!", he was thinking about Mentana. He called Enrico many times, that he might help him, then he said: "but we will certainly win; we will go to Rome!"

=== Capture of Rome ===
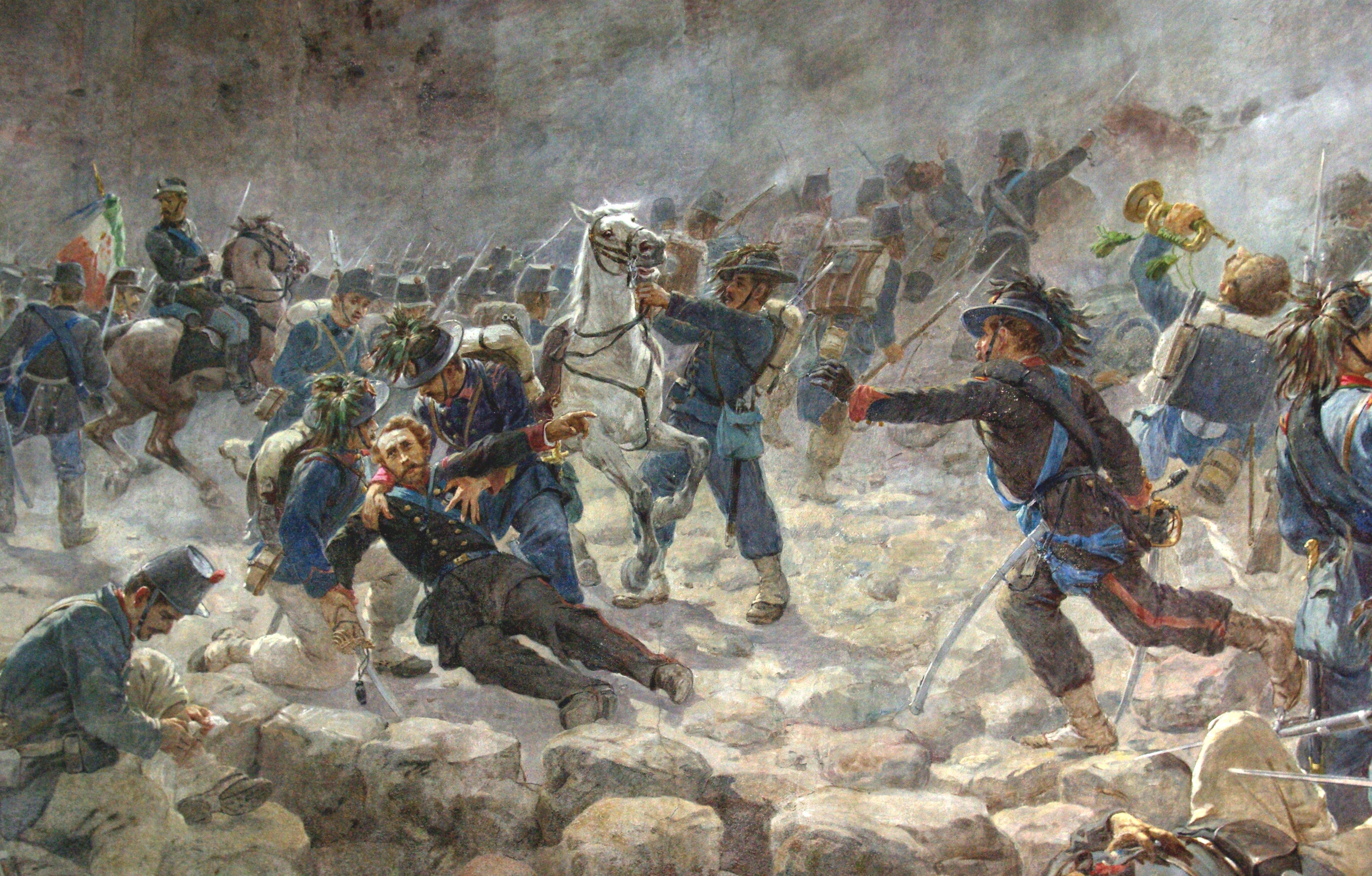
Capture of Rome

In July 1870, the Franco-Prussian War began. In early August, the French Emperor Napoleon III recalled his garrison from Rome, thus no longer providing protection to the Papal State. Widespread public demonstrations illustrated the demand that the Italian government take Rome. The Italian government took no direct action until the collapse of the Second French Empire at the Battle of Sedan. King Victor Emmanuel II sent Count Gustavo Ponza di San Martino to Pius IX with a personal letter offering a face-saving proposal that would have allowed the peaceful entry of the Italian Army into Rome, under the guise of offering protection to the pope. The Papacy, however, rejected the proposal outright:

The pope's reception of San Martino (10 September 1870) was unfriendly. Pius IX allowed violent outbursts to escape him. Throwing the King's letter upon the table he exclaimed, "Fine loyalty! You are all a set of vipers, of whited sepulchres, and wanting in faith." He was perhaps alluding to other letters received from the King. After, growing calmer, he exclaimed: "I am no prophet, nor son of a prophet, but I tell you, you will never enter Rome!". San Martino was so mortified that he left the next day.

The Royal Italian Army, commanded by General Raffaele Cadorna, crossed the Papal frontier on 11 September and advanced slowly toward Rome, hoping that a peaceful entry could be negotiated. The Italian Army reached the Aurelian Walls on 19 September and placed Rome under a state of siege. Although now convinced of his unavoidable defeat, Pius IX remained intransigent to the bitter end and forced his troops to put up a token resistance. On 20 September, after a cannonade of three hours had breached the Aurelian Walls at Porta Pia, the Bersaglieri entered Rome and marched down Via Pia, which was subsequently renamed Via XX Settembre. Forty-nine Italian soldiers and four officers, and nineteen papal troops, died. Rome and Latium were annexed to the Kingdom of Italy after a plebiscite held on 2 October. The results of this plebiscite were accepted by decree of 9 October.

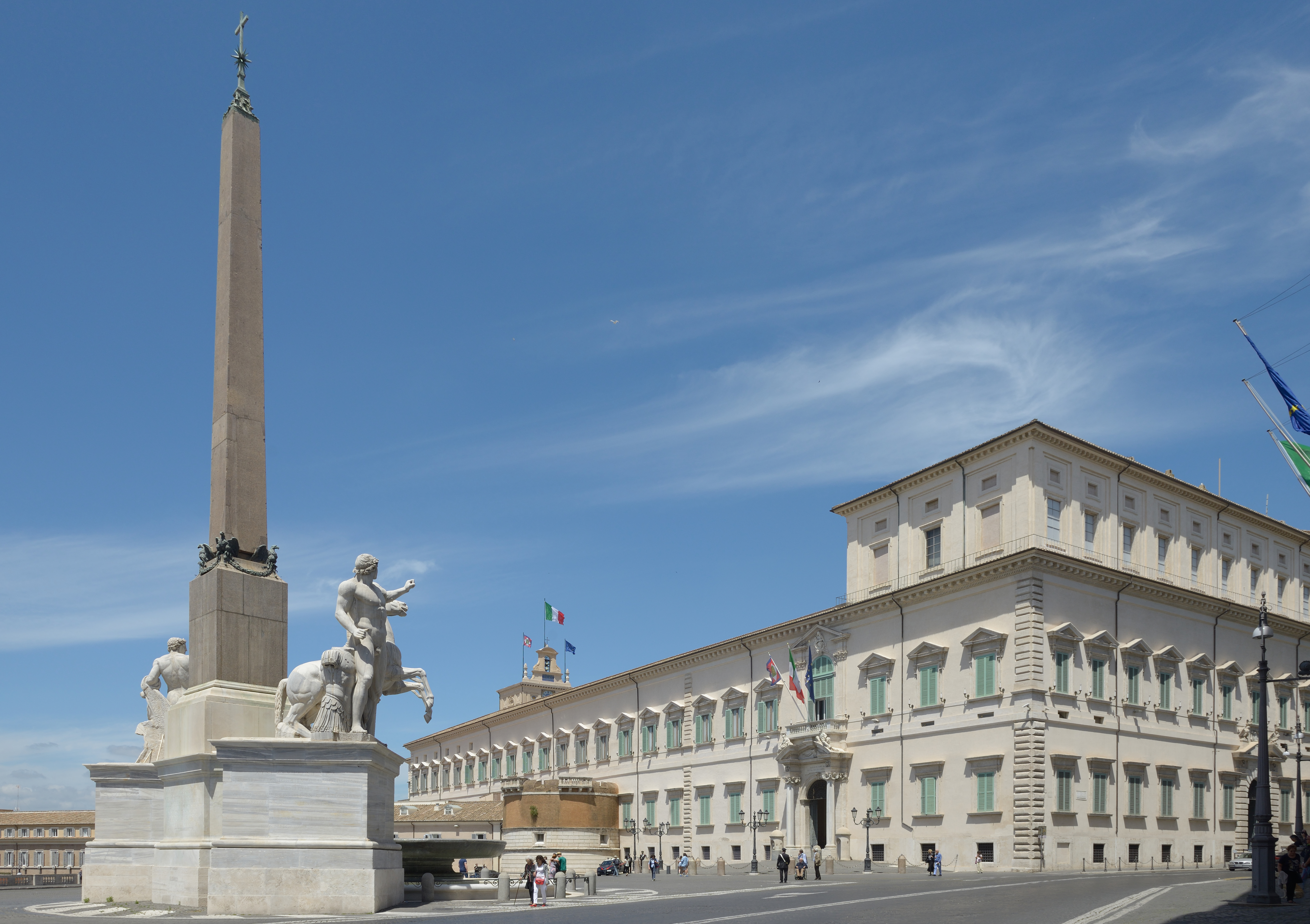
The Quirinal Palace in Rome became the official residence (royal residence of the Kings of Italy and after the Italian constitutional referendum, 1946 residence and workplace for the Presidents of the Italian Republic).

Initially the Italian government had offered to let the pope keep the Leonine City under the Law of Guarantees, but the pope rejected the offer because acceptance would have been an implied endorsement of the legitimacy of the Italian kingdom's rule over his former domain. Pius IX declared himself a prisoner in the Vatican, although he was not actually restrained from coming and going. Rather, being deposed and stripped of much of his former power also removed a measure of personal protection—if he had walked the streets of Rome, he might have been in danger from political opponents who had formerly kept their views private. Officially, the capital was not moved from Florence to Rome until July 1871.

Historian Raffaele de Cesare made the following observations about Italian unification:

The Roman question was the stone tied to Napoleon's feet – that dragged him into the abyss. He never forgot, even in August 1870, a month before Sedan, that he was a sovereign of a Catholic country, that he had been made Emperor, and was supported by the votes of the Conservatives and the influence of the clergy; and that it was his supreme duty not to abandon the Pontiff.

For twenty years Napoleon III had been the true sovereign of Rome, where he had many friends and relations…. Without him the temporal power would never have been reconstituted, nor, being reconstituted, would have endured.

== Problems ==
Unification was achieved entirely in terms of Piedmont's interests. Martin Clark says, "It was Piedmontization all around." Cavour died unexpectedly in June 1861, at 50, and most of the many promises that he made to regional authorities to induce them to join the newly unified Italian kingdom were ignored. The new Kingdom of Italy was structured by renaming the old Kingdom of Sardinia and annexing all the new provinces into its structures. The first king was Victor Emmanuel II, who kept his old title.

National and regional officials were all appointed by Piedmont. A few regional leaders succeeded to high positions in the new national government, but the top bureaucratic and military officials were mostly Piedmontese. The national capital was briefly moved to Florence and finally to Rome, one of the cases of Piedmont losing out.

However, Piedmontese tax rates and regulations, diplomats and officials were imposed on all of Italy. The constitution was Piedmont's old constitution. The document was generally liberal and was welcomed by liberal elements. However, its anticlerical provisions were resented in the pro-clerical regions in places such as around Venice, Rome, and Naples—as well as the island of Sicily. Cavour had promised there would be regional and municipal, local governments, but all the promises were broken in 1861.

The first decade of the kingdom saw savage insurrections in Sicily and in the Naples region. Hearder claimed that failed efforts to protest unification involved "a mixture of spontaneous peasant movement and a Bourbon-clerical reaction directed by the old authorities".

The pope lost Rome in 1870 and ordered the Catholic Church not to co-operate with the new government, a decision fully reversed only in 1929. Most people for Risorgimento had wanted strong provinces, but they got a strong central state instead. The inevitable long-run results were a severe weakness of national unity and a politicized system based on mutually hostile regional violence. Such factors remain in the 21st century.

=== Ruling and representing southern Italy ===
From the spring of 1860 to the summer of 1861, a major challenge that the Piedmontese parliament faced on national unification was how they should govern and control the southern regions of the country that were frequently represented and described by northern Italian correspondents as "corrupt", "barbaric", and "uncivilized". In response to the depictions of southern Italy, the Piedmontese parliament had to decide whether it should investigate the southern regions to better understand the social and political situations there or it should establish jurisdiction and order by using mostly force.

The dominance of letters sent from the northern Italian correspondents that deemed southern Italy to be "so far from the ideas of progress and civilization" ultimately induced the Piedmontese parliament to choose the latter course of action, which effectively illustrated the intimate connection between representation and rule. In essence, the northern Italians' "representation of the south as a land of barbarism (variously qualified as indecent, lacking in 'public conscience', ignorant, superstitious, etc.)" provided the Piedmontese with the justification to rule the southern regions on the pretext of implementing a superior, more civilized, "Piedmontese morality".

== Historiography ==
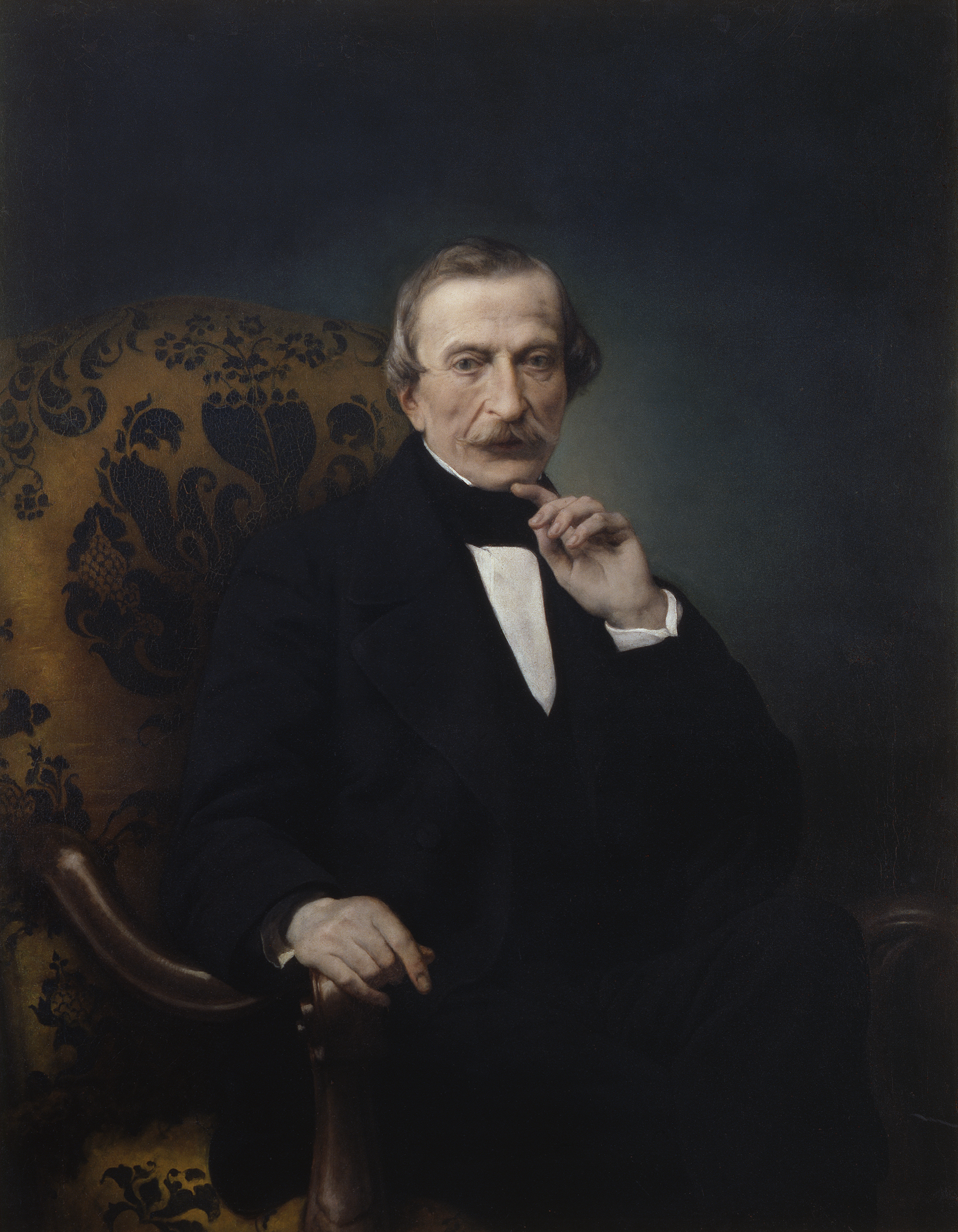
Massimo d'Azeglio, a moderate liberal statesman, novelist, and painter (1798–1866)

Italian unification is still a topic of debate. According to Massimo d'Azeglio, centuries of foreign domination created remarkable differences in Italian society, and the role of the newly formed government was to face these differences and to create a unified Italian society. Still today the most famous quote of Massimo d'Azeglio is, "L'Italia è fatta. Restano da fare gli italiani" ('Italy has been made. Now it remains to make Italians').

The economist and politician Francesco Saverio Nitti criticized the newly created state for not considering the substantial economic differences between northern Italy, a free-market economy, and southern Italy, a state protectionist economy, when integrating the two. When the Kingdom of Italy extended the free-market economy to the rest of the country, the south's economy collapsed under the weight of the north's. Nitti contended that this change should have been much more gradual in order to allow the birth of an adequate entrepreneurial class able to make strong investments and initiatives in the south. These mistakes, he felt, were the cause of the economic and social problems which came to be known as the southern question (Questione Meridionale).

The politician, historian, and writer Gaetano Salvemini commented that although Italian unification had been a strong opportunity for both a moral and economic rebirth of Italy's Mezzogiorno (southern Italy), because of a lack of understanding and action on the part of politicians, corruption and organized crime flourished in the south. The Marxist theorist Antonio Gramsci criticized Italian unification for the limited presence of the masses in politics, as well as the lack of modern land reform in Italy.

Revisionism of Risorgimento produced a clear radicalization of Italy in the mid-20th century, following the fall of the Savoy monarchy and fascism during World War II. Reviews of the historical facts concerning Italian unification's successes and failures continue to be undertaken by domestic and foreign academic authors, including Denis Mack Smith, Christopher Duggan, and Lucy Riall. Recent work emphasizes the central importance of nationalism.

== Risorgimento and Italian irredentism ==
=== Origins of Italian irredentism ===
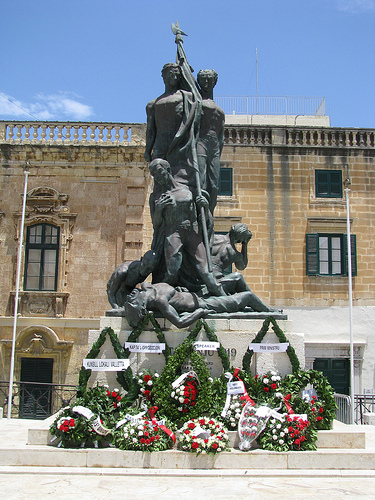
The Sette Giugno monument, symbol of the pro-Italian Maltese

It can be argued that Italian unification was never truly completed in the 19th century. Even after the Capture of Rome (1871), the final event of the unification of Italy, many ethnic Italian speakers (Trentino-Alto Adigan Italians, Savoyard Italians, Corfiot Italians, Niçard Italians, Swiss Italians, Corsican Italians, Maltese Italians, Istrian Italians and Dalmatian Italians) remained outside the borders of the Kingdom of Italy and this situation created the Italian irredentism.

The Corsican revolutionary Pasquale Paoli was called "the precursor of Italian irredentism" by Niccolò Tommaseo because he was the first to promote the Italian language and socio-culture (the main characteristics of Italian irredentism) in his island; Paoli wanted the Italian language to be the official language of the newly founded Corsican Republic.

The term Risorgimento refers to the domestic reorganization of the stratified Italian identity into a unified, national front. The word literally means 'rising again' and was an ideological movement which strove to spark national pride, leading to political oppositionalism to foreign rule and influence. There is contention on its actual impact in Italy, some Scholars arguing it was a liberalizing time for 19th-century Italian culture, while others speculate that although it was a patriotic revolution, it only tangibly aided the upper-class and bourgeois publics without actively benefitting the lower classes.

Italia irredenta was an Italian nationalist opinion movement that emerged after Italian unification. It advocated irredentism among the Italian people as well as other nationalities who were willing to become Italian and as a movement; it is also known as "Italian irredentism". Not a formal organization, it was just an opinion movement that claimed that Italy had to reach its "natural borders", meaning that the country would need to incorporate all areas predominantly consisting of ethnic Italians within the near vicinity outside its borders. Similar patriotic and nationalistic ideas were common in Europe in the 19th century.

At the beginning, Italian irredentism promoted the annexation to Italy of territories where Italians formed the absolute majority of the population, but retained by the Austrian Empire after the Third Italian War of Independence in 1866. During World War One the main "irredent lands" (terre irredente) were considered to be the provinces of Trento and Trieste and, in a narrow sense, irredentists referred to the Italian patriots living in these two areas.

The term was later expanded to also include multilingual and multiethnic areas, where Italians were a relative majority or a substantial minority, within the northern Italian region encompassed by the Alps, with German, Italian, Slovene, Croatian, Ladin and Istro-Romanian population, such as South Tyrol, Istria, Gorizia and Gradisca and part of Dalmatia. The claims were further extended also to the city of Fiume (see Impresa di Fiume), Corsica, the island of Malta, the County of Nice and Italian Switzerland.

Many Istrian Italians and Dalmatian Italians looked with sympathy towards the Risorgimento movement that fought for the unification of Italy. However, after the Third Italian War of Independence (1866), when the Veneto and Friuli regions were ceded by the Austrians to the newly formed Kingdom Italy, Istria and Dalmatia remained part of the Austro-Hungarian Empire, together with other Italian-speaking areas on the eastern Adriatic. This triggered the gradual rise of Italian irredentism among many Italians in Istria, Kvarner and Dalmatia, who demanded the unification of the Julian March, Kvarner and Dalmatia with Italy. The Italians in Istria, Kvarner and Dalmatia supported the Italian Risorgimento: as a consequence, the Austrians saw the Italians as enemies and favored the Slav communities of Istria, Kvarner and Dalmatia. During the meeting of the Council of Ministers of 12 November 1866, Emperor Franz Joseph I of Austria outlined a wide-ranging project aimed at the Germanization or Slavization of the areas of the empire with an Italian presence:

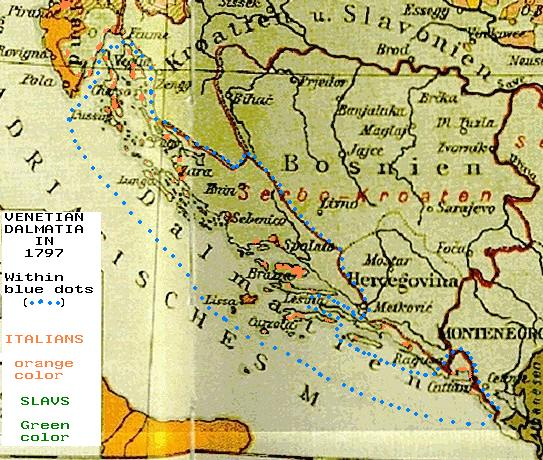
Austrian linguistic map from 1896. In green the areas where Slavs were the majority of the population, in orange the areas where Istrian Italians and Dalmatian Italians were the majority of the population. The boundaries of Venetian Dalmatia in 1797 are delimited with blue dots.

His Majesty expressed the precise order that action be taken decisively against the influence of the Italian elements still present in some regions of the Crown and, appropriately occupying the posts of public, judicial, masters employees as well as with the influence of the press, work in South Tyrol, Dalmatia and Littoral for the Germanization and Slavization of these territories according to the circumstances, with energy and without any regard. His Majesty calls the central offices to the strong duty to proceed in this way to what has been established.

— Franz Joseph I of Austria, Council of the Crown of 12 November 1866

Istrian Italians made up about a third of the population in 1900. Dalmatia, especially its maritime cities, once had a substantial local ethnic Italian population (Dalmatian Italians). According to Austrian census, the Dalmatian Italians formed 12.5% of the population in 1865. In the 1910 Austro-Hungarian census, Istria had a population of 57.8% Slavic speakers (Croat and Slovene), and 38.1% Italian speakers. For the Austrian Kingdom of Dalmatia, (i.e. Dalmatia), the 1910 numbers were 96.2% Slavic speakers and 2.8% Italian speakers.

The Italian population in Dalmatia was concentrated in the major coastal cities. In the city of Split in 1890 there were 1,971 Dalmatian Italians (9% of the population), in Zadar 7,672 (27%), in Šibenik 1,090 (5%), in Kotor 646 (12%) and in Dubrovnik 356 (3%). In other Dalmatian localities, according to Austrian censuses, Dalmatian Italians experienced a sudden decrease: in the twenty years 1890-1910, in Rab they went from 225 to 151, in Vis from 352 to 92, in Pag from 787 to 23, completely disappearing in almost all the inland locations. In 1909 the Italian language lost its status as the official language of Dalmatia in favor of Croatian only (previously both languages were recognized): thus Italian could no longer be used in the public and administrative sphere.

=== Irredentism and the World Wars ===
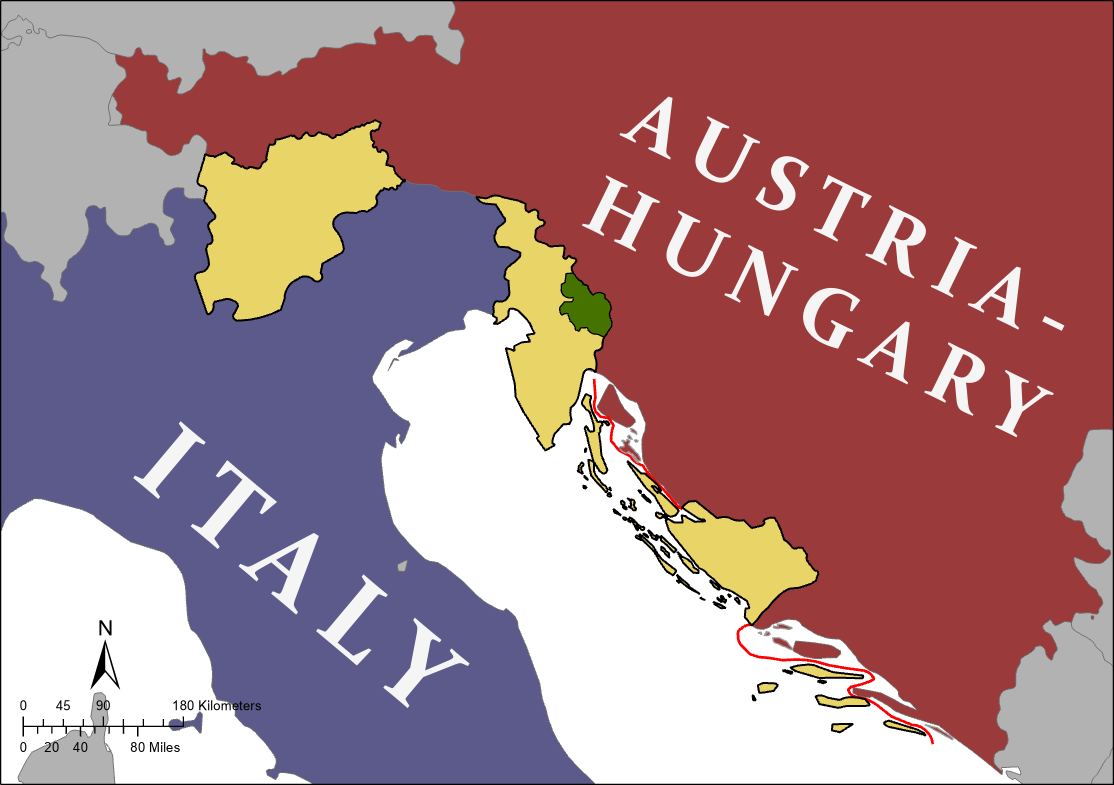
Territories promised to Italy by the Treaty of London (1915), i.e. Trentino-Alto Adige, the Julian March and Dalmatia (tan), and the Snežnik Plateau area (green). Dalmatia, after the WWI, however, was not assigned to Italy but to Yugoslavia.

Italy entered into the First World War in 1915 with the aim of completing national unity: for this reason, the Italian intervention in the First World War is also considered the Fourth Italian War of Independence, in a historiographical perspective that identifies in the latter the conclusion of the unification of Italy, whose military actions began during the revolutions of 1848 with the First Italian War of Independence.

During the post-unification era, some Italians were dissatisfied with the current state of the Italian Kingdom since they wanted the kingdom to include Trieste, Istria, and other adjacent territories as well. This Italian irredentism succeeded in World War I with the annexation of Trieste and Trento, with the respective territories of Julian March and Trentino-Alto Adige.

The Kingdom of Italy had declared neutrality at the beginning of the war, officially because the Triple Alliance with Germany and Austria-Hungary was a defensive one, requiring its members to come under attack first. Many Italians were still hostile to Austria's continuing occupation of ethnically Italian areas, and Italy chose not to enter. Austria-Hungary requested Italian neutrality, while the Triple Entente (which included Great Britain, France and Russia) requested its intervention. With the Treaty of London, signed in April 1915, Italy agreed to declare war against the Central Powers in exchange for the irredent territories of Friuli, Trentino, and Dalmatia (see Italia irredenta).

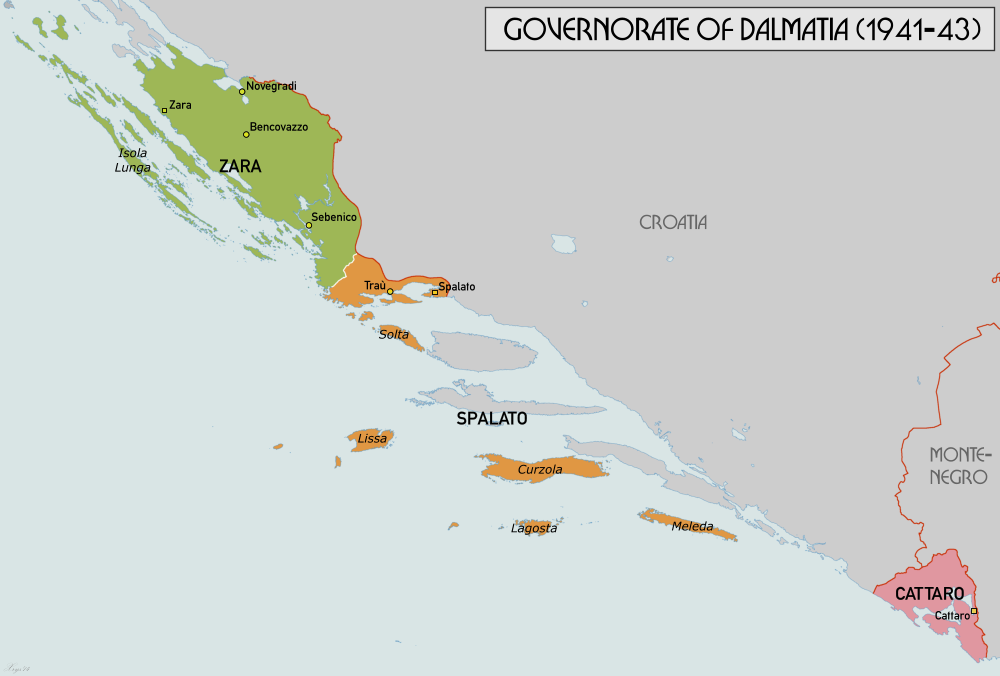
Map of the three Italian provinces of the Governorate of Dalmatia (1941–1943): province of Zara, province of Spalato and province of Cattaro

Italian irredentism obtained an important result after the First World War, when Italy gained Trieste, Gorizia, Istria, and the cities of Zara and Pola after the Treaty of Rapallo in 1920. Some historians see the Risorgimento as continuing to that time, which is the view presented at the Central Museum of the Risorgimento at Altare della Patria in Rome. But Italy did not receive other territories promised by the Treaty of London, such Dalmatia, so this outcome was denounced as a "mutilated victory". The rhetoric of "mutilated victory" was adopted by Benito Mussolini and led to the rise of Italian Fascism, becoming a key point in the propaganda of Fascist Italy. Historians regard "mutilated victory" as a "political myth", used by fascists to fuel Italian imperialism and obscure the successes of liberal Italy in the aftermath of World War I.

During the Second World War, after the Axis attack on Yugoslavia, Italy created the Governatorate of Dalmatia (from 1941 to September 1943), so the Kingdom of Italy annexed temporarily Split (Italian Spalato), Kotor (Cattaro), and most of coastal Dalmatia. From 1942 to 1943, Corsica and Nice (Italian Nizza) were temporarily annexed to the Kingdom of Italy, nearly fulfilling in those years the ambitions of Italian irredentism.

For its avowed purpose, the movement had the "emancipation" of all Italian lands still subject to foreign rule after Italian unification. The Irredentists took language as the test of the alleged Italian nationality of the countries they proposed to emancipate, which were Trentino, Trieste, Dalmatia, Istria, Gorizia, Ticino, Nice (Nizza), Corsica, and Malta. Austria-Hungary promoted Croatian interests in Dalmatia and Istria to weaken Italian claims in the western Balkans before the First World War.

=== End of Italian irredentism ===
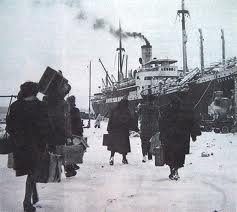
Istrian Italians leave Pola in 1947 during the Istrian-Dalmatian exodus.

Under the 1947 Treaty of Peace with Italy, Istria, Kvarner, most of the Julian March as well as the Dalmatian city of Zara was annexed by Yugoslavia, giving the people on both sides of the border the right of option of nationality; the ensuing Istrian-Dalmatian exodus led to the emigration of between 230,000 and 350,000 of local ethnic Italians (Istrian Italians and Dalmatian Italians), the others being ethnic Slovenians, ethnic Croatians, and ethnic Istro-Romanians, choosing to maintain Italian citizenship.

The Istrian-Dalmatian exodus started in 1943 and ended completely only in 1960. According to the census organized in Croatia in 2001 and that organized in Slovenia in 2002, the Italians who remained in the former Yugoslavia amounted to 21,894 people (2,258 in Slovenia and 19,636 in Croatia).

After World War II, Italian irredentism disappeared along with the defeated Fascists and the Monarchy of the House of Savoy. After the Treaty of Paris (1947) and the Treaty of Osimo (1975), all territorial claims were abandoned by the Italian Republic (see Foreign relations of Italy). The Italian irredentist movement thus vanished from Italian politics. The 1947 Constitution of Italy established five autonomous regions (Sardinia, Friuli-Venezia Giulia, Sicily, Aosta Valley, and Trentino-Alto Adige/Südtirol), in recognition of their cultural and linguistic distinctiveness.

== Anniversary of the unification of Italy ==
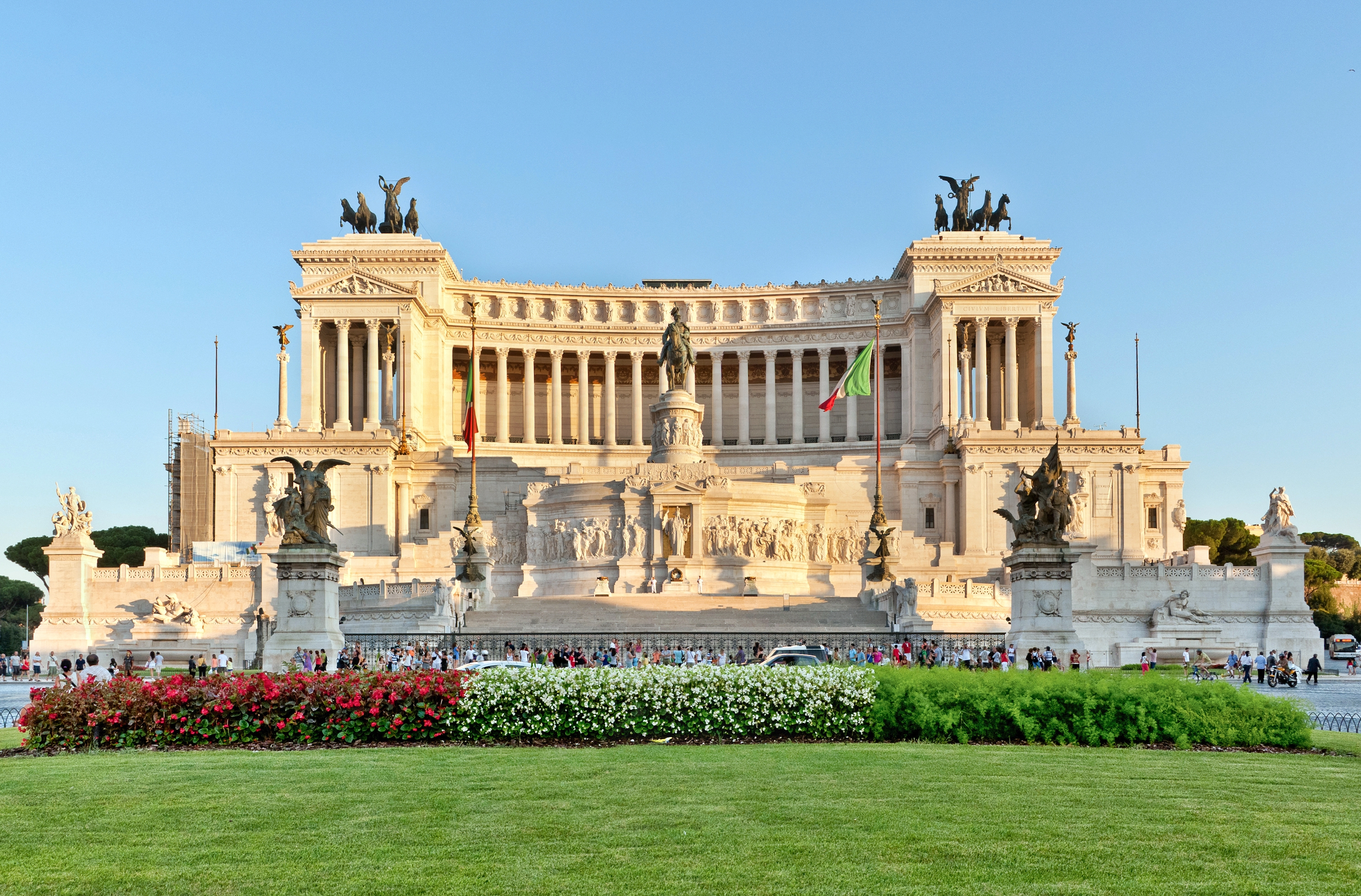
The Victor Emmanuel II Monument in Rome, inaugurated in 1911 on the occasion of the 50th anniversary of the unification of Italy

Italy celebrates the anniversary of the unification every fifty years, on 17 March (the date of proclamation of the Kingdom of Italy). The anniversary occurred in 1911 (50th), 1961 (100th), 2011 (150th) and 2021 (160th) with several celebrations throughout the country. While remaining a working day, 17 March is considered a "day promoting the values linked to national identity".

The National Unity and Armed Forces Day, celebrated on 4 November, commemorates the end of World War I with the Armistice of Villa Giusti, a war event considered to complete the process of unification of Italy.

== Culture and Risorgimento ==
=== Art ===
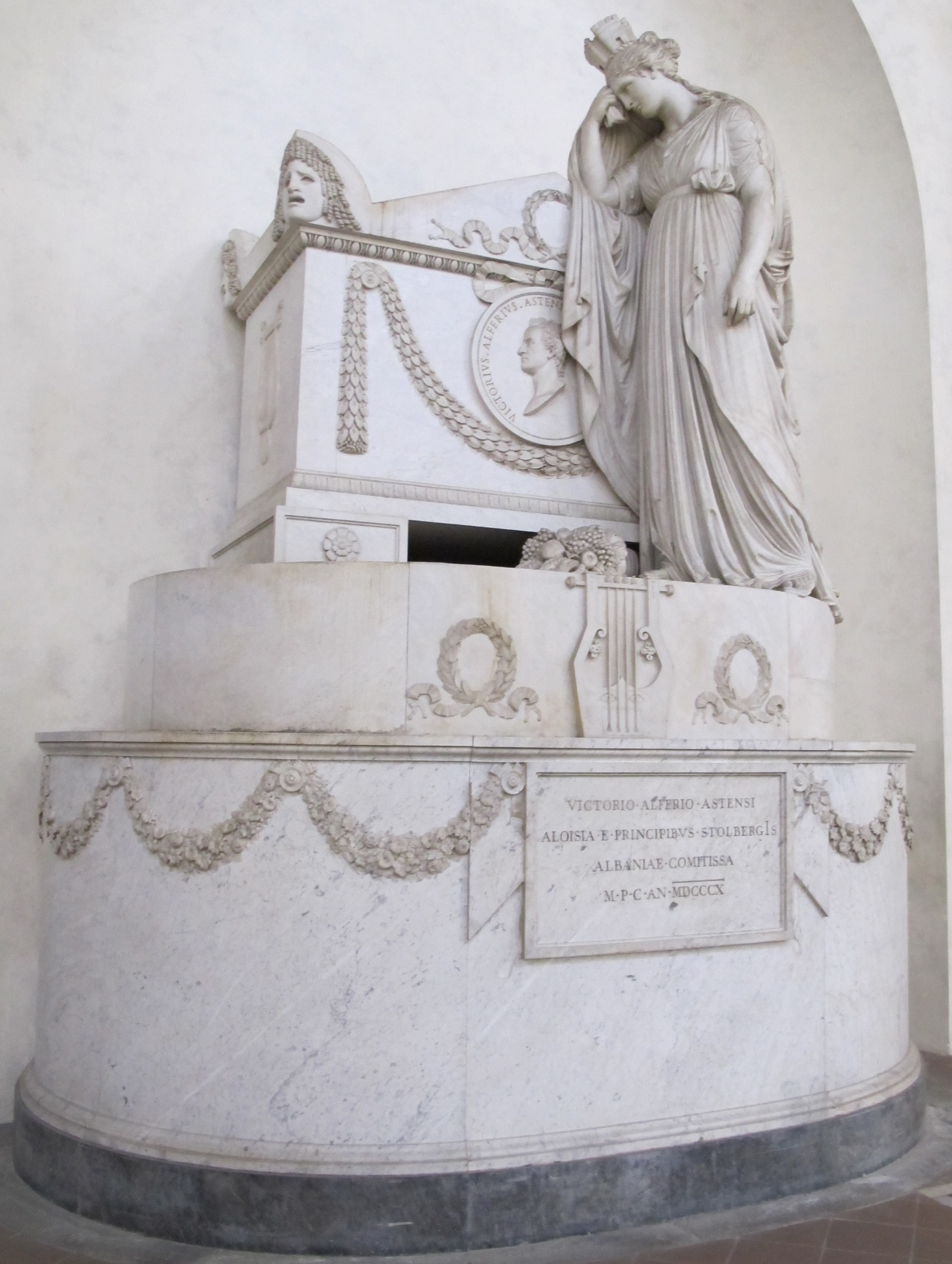
Mourning Italia turrita on the tomb to Vittorio Alfieri by Antonio Canova

In art, this period was characterised by the Neoclassicism that draws inspiration from the "classical" art and culture of Ancient Greece or Ancient Rome. The main Italian sculptor was Antonio Canova who became famous for his marble sculptures that delicately rendered nude flesh. The mourning Italia turrita on the tomb to Vittorio Alfieri is one of the main works of Risorgimento by Canova. By this time, in sculpture, a veiled woman in the style of the Veiled Rebecca of Benzoni had become an allegory for Italian unification.

Francesco Hayez was another remarkable artist of this period whose works often contain allegories about Italian unification. His most known painting The Kiss aims to portray the spirit of the Risorgimento: the man wears red, white and green, representing the Italian patriots fighting for independence from the Austro-Hungarian empire while the girl's pale blue dress signifies France, which in 1859 (the year of the painting's creation) made an alliance with the Kingdom of Piedmont and Sardinia enabling the latter to unify the many states of the Italian peninsula into the new kingdom of Italy. Hayez's three paintings on the Sicilian Vespers are an implicit protest against the foreign domination of Italy.

Andrea Appiani, Domenico Induno, and Gerolamo Induno are also known for their patriotic canvases. The Risorgimento was also represented by works not necessarily linked to Neoclassicism—as in the case of Giovanni Fattori who was one of the leaders of the group known as the Macchiaioli and who soon became a leading Italian plein-airist, painting landscapes, rural scenes, and military life during the Italian unification.

=== Literature ===
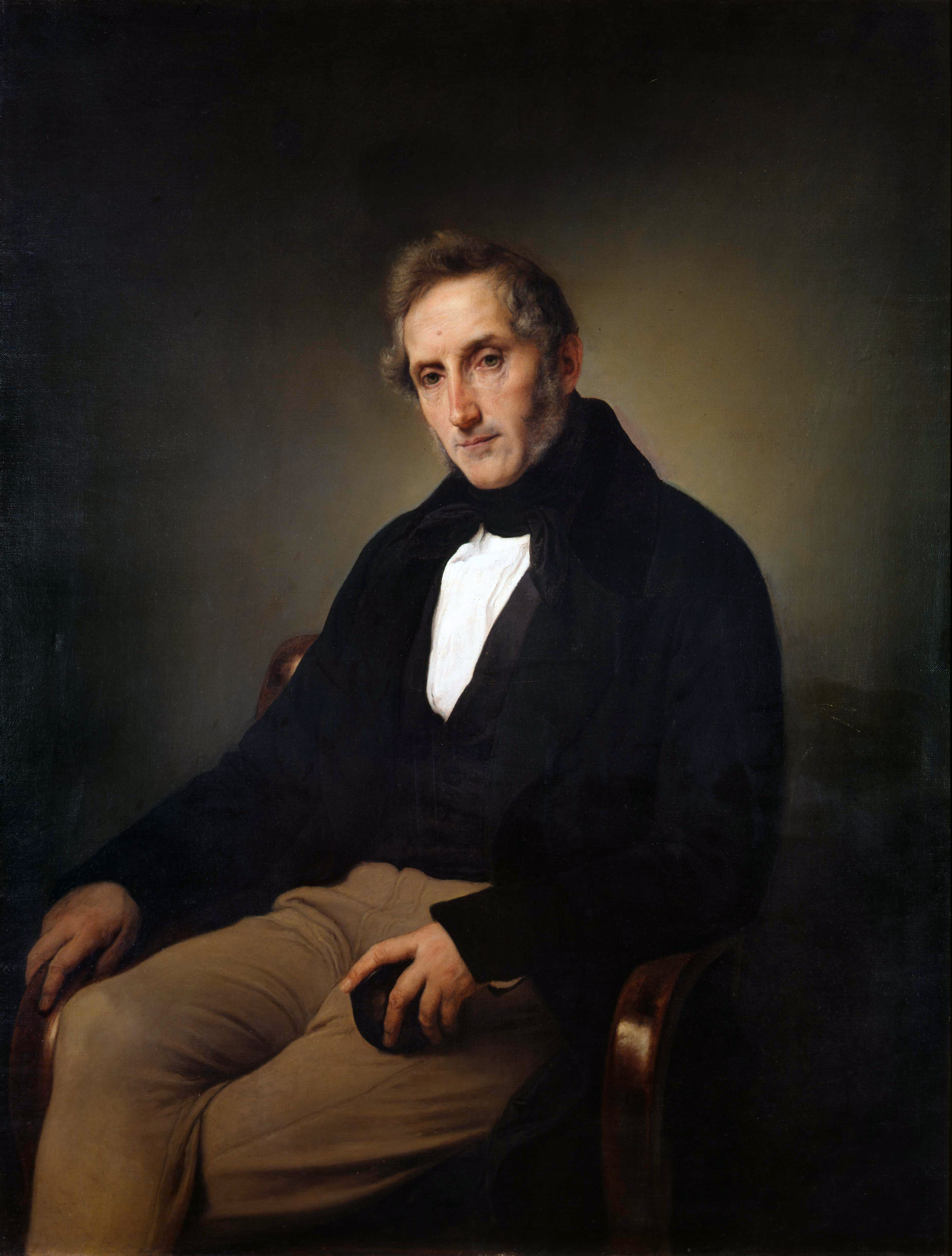
Alessandro Manzoni is famous for the novel The Betrothed (1827), generally ranked among the masterpieces of world literature. He contributed to the nationwide use of the Italian language.

The most well known writer of Risorgimento is Alessandro Manzoni, whose works are a symbol of the Italian unification, both for its patriotic message and because of his efforts in the development of the modern, unified Italian language. He is famous for the novel The Betrothed (orig. Italian: I promessi sposi, 1827), generally ranked among the masterpieces of world literature.

Vittorio Alfieri, was the founder of a new school in the Italian drama, expressed in several occasions his suffering about the foreign domination's tyranny.

Ugo Foscolo describes in his works the passion and love for the fatherland and the glorious history of the Italian people; these two concepts are respectively well expressed in two masterpieces, The Last Letters of Jacopo Ortis and Dei Sepolcri.

Vincenzo Monti, known for the Italian translation of the Iliad, described in his works both enthusiasms and disappointments of Risorgimento until his death.

Giovanni Berchet wrote a poetry characterized by a high moral, popular and social content; he also contributed to Il Conciliatore, a progressive bi-weekly scientific and literary journal, influential in the early Risorgimento that was published in Milan from September 1818 until October 1819 when it was closed by the Austrian censors; its writers included also Ludovico di Breme, Giuseppe Nicolini, and Silvio Pellico.

Giacomo Leopardi was one of the most important poets of Risorgimento thanks to works such as Canzone all'Italia and Risorgimento.

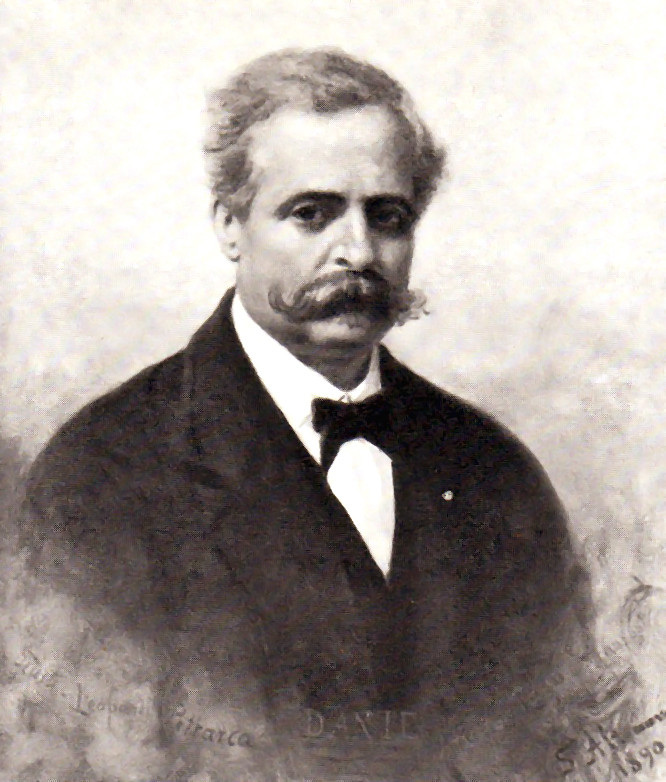
Portrait of Francesco De Sanctis (1890) by Francesco Saverio Altamura

Niccolò Tommaseo, the editor of the Italian Language Dictionary in eight volumes, was a precursor of the Italian irredentism and his works are a rare examples of a metropolitan culture above nationalism; he supported the liberal revolution headed by Daniele Manin against the Austrian Empire and he will always support the unification of Italy.

Francesco de Sanctis was one of the most important scholars of Italian language and literature in the 19th century; he supported the Revolution of 1848 in Naples and for this reason he was imprisoned for three years; his reputation as a lecturer on Dante in Turin brought him the appointment of professor at ETH Zürich in 1856; he returned to Naples as Minister of Public Education after the unification of Italy.

The writer and patriot Luigi Settembrini published anonymously the Protest of the People of the Two Sicilies, a scathing indictment of the Bourbon government and was imprisoned and exiled several times by the Bourbons because of his support to Risorgimento; after the formation of the Kingdom of Italy, he was appointed professor of Italian literature at the University of Naples.

Ippolito Nievo is another main representative of Risorgimento with his novel Confessioni d'un italiano; he fought with Giuseppe Garibaldi's Expedition of the Thousand.

The Risorgimento was also depicted in famous novels: The Leopard written by Giuseppe Tomasi di Lampedusa, Heart by Edmondo De Amicis, and The Little World of the Past by Antonio Fogazzaro.

=== Music ===
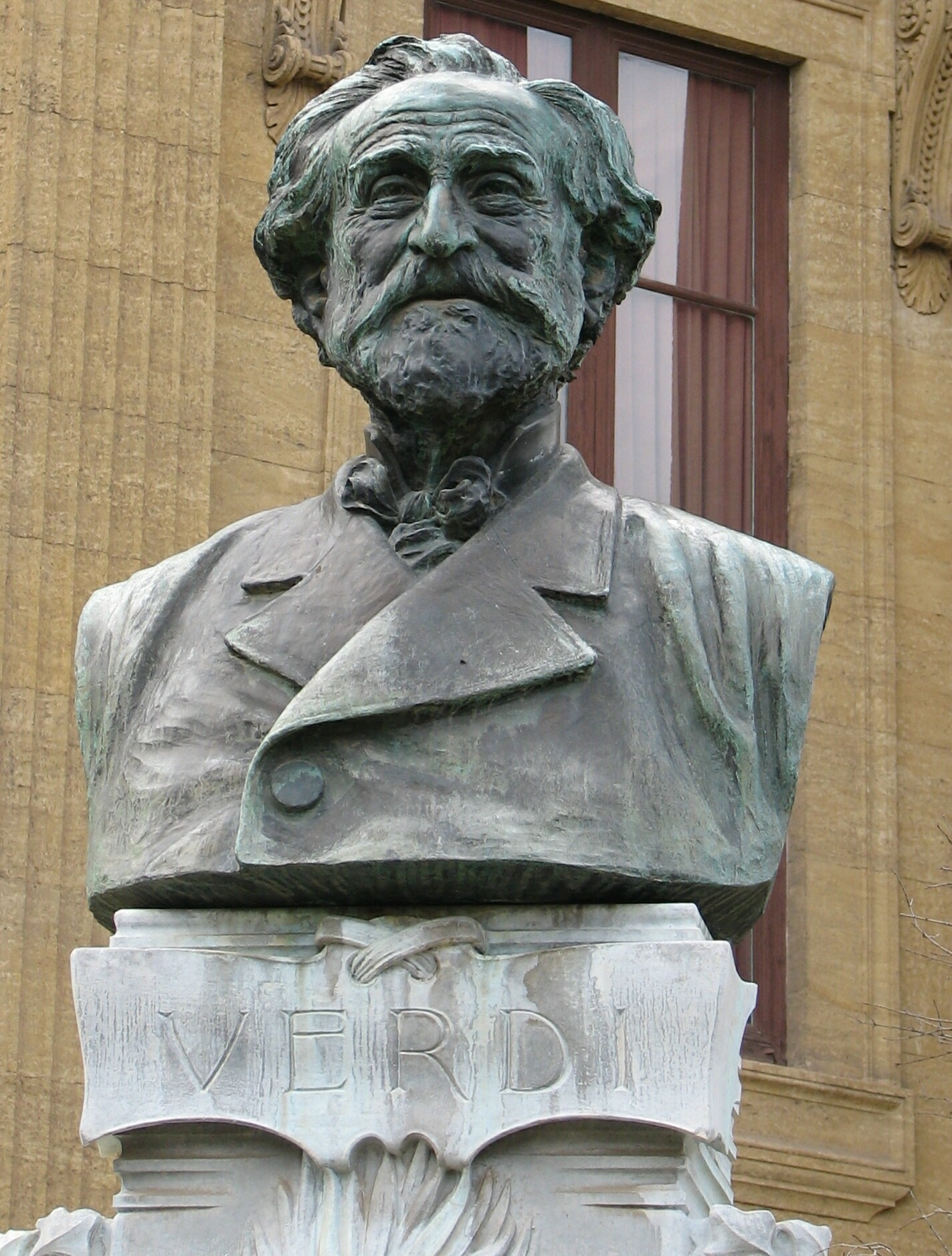
Verdi's bust outside the Teatro Massimo in Palermo

Risorgimento won the support of many leading Italian opera composers. Their librettos often saw a delicate balance between European romantic narratives and dramatic themes evoking nationalistic sentiments. Ideas expressed in operas stimulated the political mobilisation in Italy and among the cultured classes of Europe who appreciated Italian opera. Furthermore, Mazzini and many other nationalists found inspiration in musical discourses.

In his L'italiana in Algeri ('The Italian Girl in Algiers'), Gioachino Rossini expressed his support to the unification of Italy; the patriotic line Pensa alla patria, e intrepido il tuo dover adempi: vedi per tutta Italia rinascere gli esempi d’ardir e di valor ('Think about the fatherland and intrepid do your duty: see for all Italy the birth of the examples of courage and value') was censored in the Kingdom of Two Sicilies.

Vincenzo Bellini was a secret member of the Carbonari and in his masterpiece I puritani (The Puritans), the last part of Act 2 is an allegory to Italian unification. Another Bellini opera, Norma, was at the center of an unexpected standing ovation during its performance in Milan in 1859: while the chorus was performing Guerra, guerra! Le galliche selve ('War, war! The Gallic forests') in Act 2, the Italians began to greet the chorus with loud applause and to yell the word War! several times towards the Austrian officers at the opera house.

The relationship between Gaetano Donizetti and the Risorgimento is still controversial. Although Giuseppe Mazzini tried to use some of Donizetti's works for promoting the Italian cause, Donizetti had always preferred not to get involved in politics.

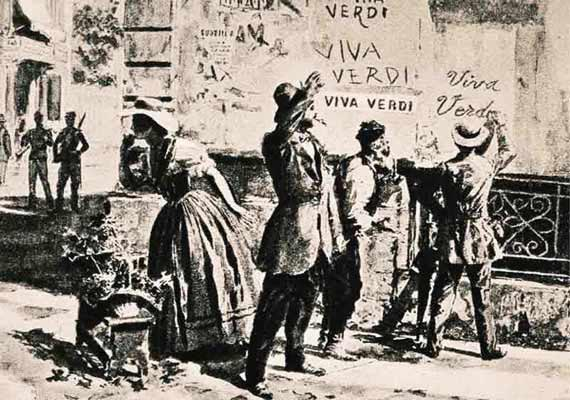
Patriots scrawling "Viva VERDI" on walls

Historians vigorously debate how political were the operas of Giuseppe Verdi (1813–1901). In particular, the chorus of the Hebrew slaves (known as "Va, pensiero") from the third act of the opera Nabucco was intended to be an anthem for Italian patriots, who were seeking to unify their country and free it from foreign control in the years up to 1861 (the chorus's theme of exiles singing about their homeland, and its lines such as O mia patria, si bella e perduta—'O my country, so lovely and so lost'—were thought to have resonated with many Italians). Beginning in Naples in 1859 and spreading throughout Italy, the slogan "Viva VERDI" was used as an acronym for Viva Vittorio Emanuele Re D'Italia ('Viva Victor Emmanuel King of Italy'), referring to Victor Emmanuel II.

Franco Della Peruta argues in favour of close links between the operas and the Risorgimento, emphasizing Verdi's patriotic intent and links to the values of the Risorgimento. Verdi started as a republican, became a strong supporter of Cavour and entered the Italian parliament on Cavour's suggestion. His politics caused him to be frequently in trouble with the Austrian censors. Verdi's main works of 1842–49 were especially relevant to the struggle for independence, including Nabucco (1842), I Lombardi alla prima crociata (1843), Ernani (1844), Attila (1846), Macbeth (1847), and La battaglia di Legnano (1848). However, starting in the 1850s, his operas showed few patriotic themes because of the heavy censorship of the absolutist regimes in power.

Verdi later became disillusioned by politics, but he was personally active part in the political world of events of the Risorgimento and was elected to the first Italian parliament in 1861. Likewise Marco Pizzo argues that after 1815 music became a political tool, and many songwriters expressed ideals of freedom and equality. Pizzo says Verdi was part of this movement, for his operas were inspired by the love of country, the struggle for Italian independence, and speak to the sacrifice of patriots and exiles. On the other side of the debate, Mary Ann Smart argues that music critics at the time seldom mentioned any political themes. Likewise Roger Parker argues that the political dimension of Verdi's operas was exaggerated by nationalistic historians looking for a hero in the late 19th century.

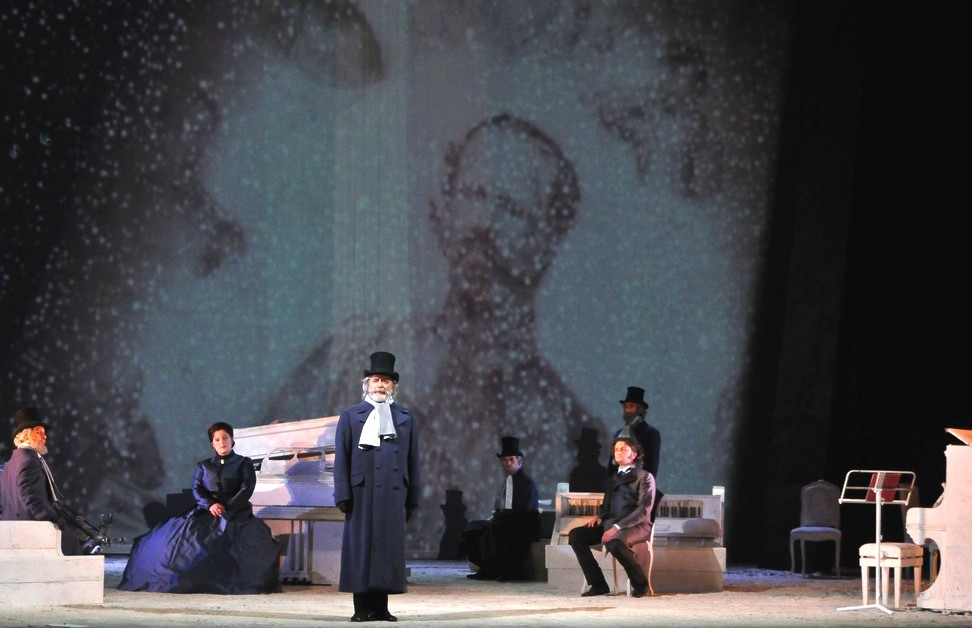
The final scene of the opera Risorgimento! (2011) by Lorenzo Ferrero

Giuseppe Verdi's Nabucco and the Risorgimento are the subject of a 2011 opera, Risorgimento! by Italian composer Lorenzo Ferrero, written to commemorate the 150th anniversary of the Italian unification.

=== Films ===
The Leopard is a film from 1963, based on the novel by Giuseppe Tomasi di Lampedusa, and directed by Luchino Visconti. It features Burt Lancaster as the eponymous character, the Prince of Salina. The film depicts his reaction to the Risorgimento, and his vain attempts to retain his social standing.

There are other movies set in this period:

- 1860 (1934), by Alessandro Blasetti
- Piccolo mondo antico (1941), by Mario Soldati
- A Garibaldian in the Convent (1942), by Vittorio De Sica
- Heart and Soul (1948), by Vittorio De Sica
- Senso (1954), by Luchino Visconti
- Garibaldi (1961), by Roberto Rossellini
- 1870 (1971), by Alfredo Giannetti
- Passion of Love (1981), by Ettore Scola (later adapted by Stephen Sondheim and James Lapine into the Tony Award-winning Broadway musical Passion)
- We Believed (2010), by Mario Martone

== Museums ==
=== Central Museum of the Risorgimento of Rome ===
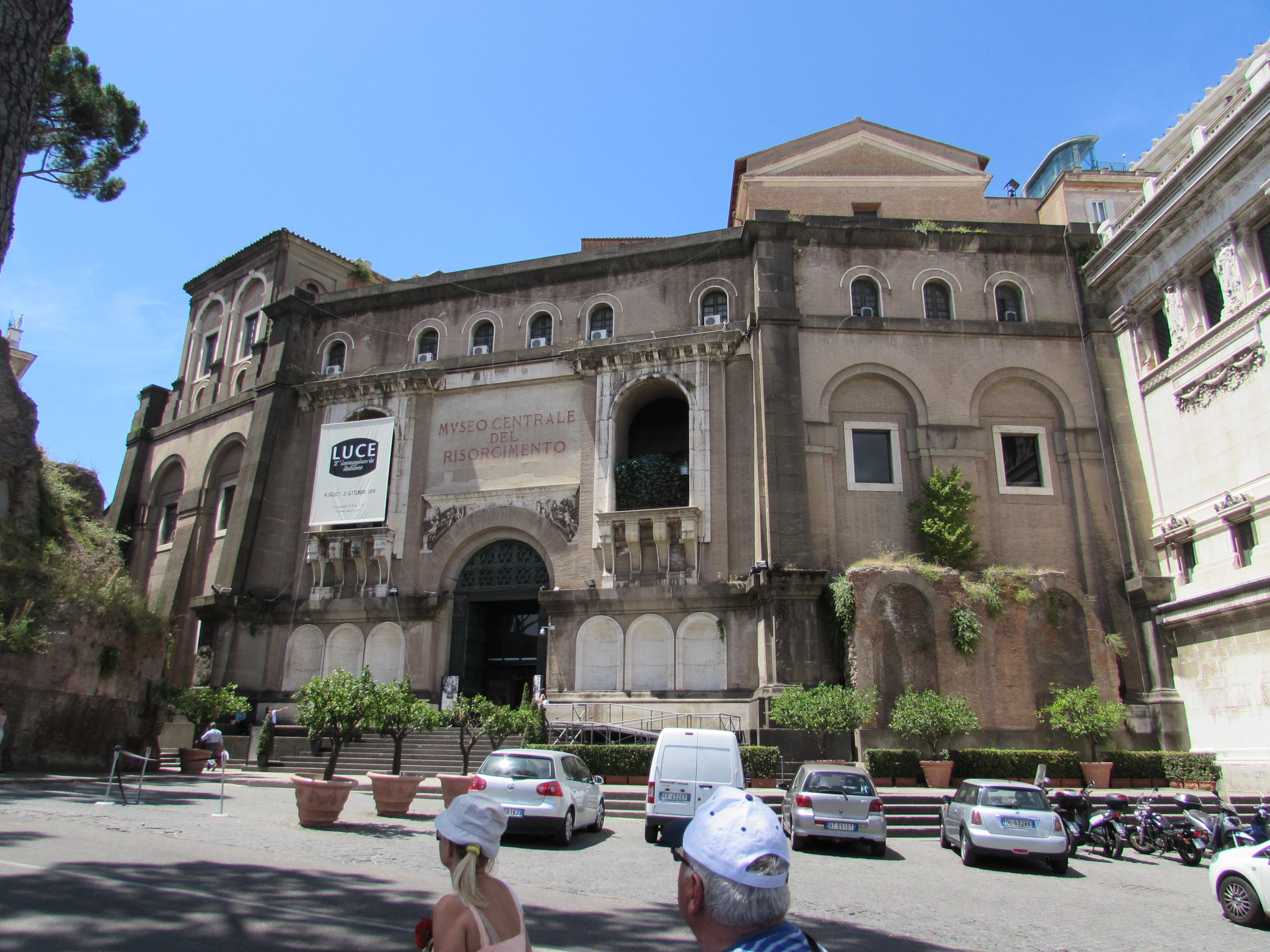
Entrance to the Central Museum of the Risorgimento from via di San Pietro in Carcere in Rome

Inside the Altare della Patria in Rome are some museums dedicated to the history of Italy, especially the Unification of Italy: the Central Museum of the Risorgimento (Italian: Museo Centrale del Risorgimento) with an adjoining study institute, the Flag of Italy Memorial (Italian: Sacrario delle bandiere) and an area that hosts temporary exhibitions of artistic interest, historical, sociological and cultural called "ala Brasini".

Since 2020, together with Palazzo Venezia, it has been managed by the VIVE Institute, one of the eleven institutes of significant general interest of the Italian Ministry of Culture.

Access to the Central Museum of the Risorgimento is on the left side of the monument, at the back of the Santa Maria in Ara Coeli along via di San Pietro in Carcere. The period of Italian history between the end of the 18th century and the First World War is displayed by memorabilia, paintings, sculptures, documents (letters, diaries and manuscripts), drawings, engravings, weapons and prints.

On the entrance stairway of the Central Museum of the Risorgimento are visible engravings related to some significant episodes for the birth of the Risorgimento movement, from the seed thrown by the French Revolution to the Napoleonic Wars, to better frame and remember the national history included between the reform of the ancient Italian states and the end of the First World War. Along the walls, other marble engravings show some pieces of texts enunciated by prominent personalities, which better testify and describe this part of Italian history.

The Central Museum of the Risorgimento also includes the Shrine of the Flags, a museum where the war flags of dissolved military units and decommissioned ships from the Italian Army, Italian Air Force, Italian Navy, Carabinieri, Polizia di Stato, Penitentiary Police and Guardia di Finanza are collected and temporarily stored. In case a unit is reformed, the flags are retrieved by the unit. Access to the shrine is along Via dei Fori Imperiali, where memorabilia, relating mainly to the Risorgimento wars, in which the Italian Armed Forces took part, are also kept.

The "ala Brasini", reserved for temporary exhibitions, is dedicated to Armando Brasini, the main promoter of the Central Museum. The wing has three exhibition rooms: the "large exhibition hall", with a surface area of 700 m^{2} (7,535 sq ft), generally hosts art exhibitions, and those that require more space, the "central hall" of 400 m^{2} (4,306 sq ft) and the "jubilee hall" of 150 m^{2} (1,615 sq ft), are used.

=== National Museum of the Risorgimento of Turin ===
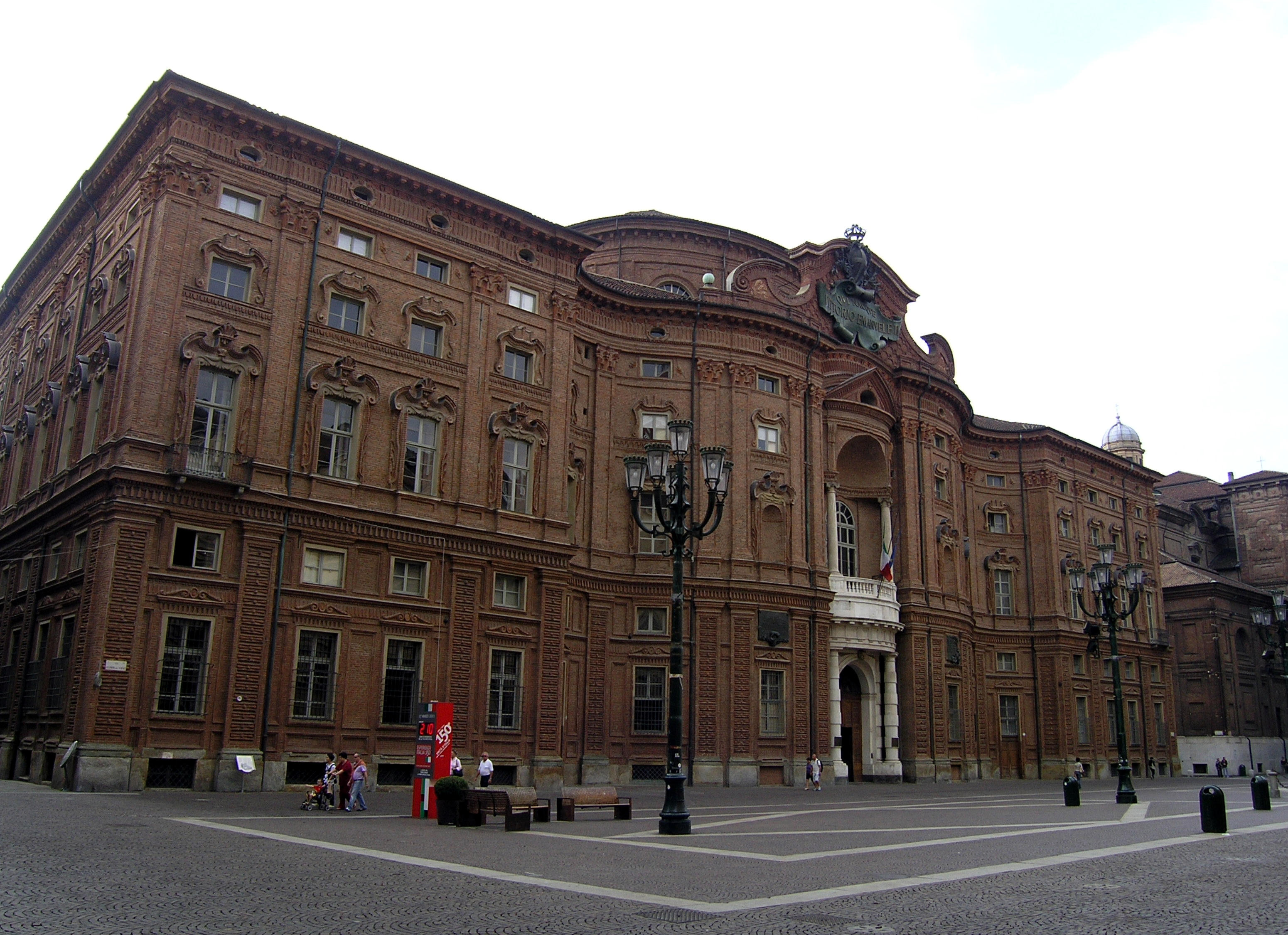
The National Museum of the Italian Risorgimento in Turin

The National Museum of the Italian Risorgimento of Turin is the first, the biggest and the most important among the 23 museums in Italy dedicated to the Risorgimento; and the only one which can be considered "national" according to a 1901 law, and due to its rich and great collections. It is housed in the Palazzo Carignano in Turin.

The museum was established in 1878, shortly after Italian unification, even though it only had its first permanent exhibition in 1908. Originally located in the Mole Antonelliana, in 1938 it was moved to its current site (which had previously housed the Subalpine Chamber of Deputies, from 1848 to 1860, and then the first Italian Chamber of Deputies, from 1861 to 1865).

Its exhibits include weapons, flags, uniforms, printed and written documents (including the original manuscript of the song Il Canto degli Italiani, dated 10 November 1847 by Goffredo Mameli, now Italian national anthem since 1946), and artworks. The new exhibition, which opened on 18 March 2011, occupies about 3500 square metres across 30 rooms, and covers the real Risorgimento period, stretching from the late-18th-century revolutions to the beginning of the First World War. It includes a specialized library, a print cabinet and a documentary archive.

=== Museum of the Risorgimento of Milan ===
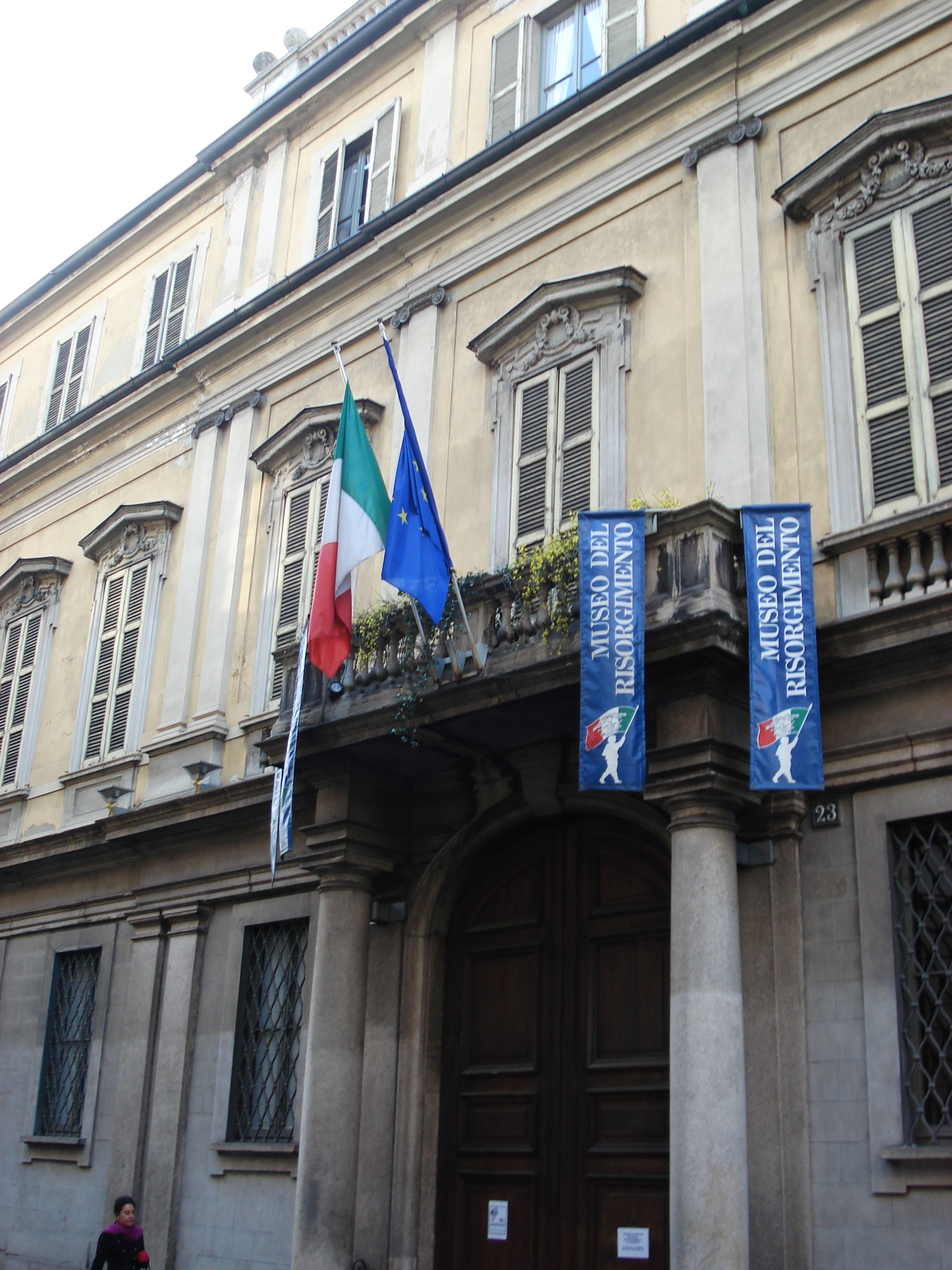
The Museum of the Risorgimento of Milan

The Museum of the Risorgimento of Milan, located in the 18th-century Milanese Palazzo Moriggia, houses a collection of objects and artworks which illustrate the history of Italian unification from Napoleon's Italian campaign of 1796 to the annexation of Rome in 1870. The city of Milan played a key role in the process, most notably on the occasion of the 1848 uprising against the Austrians known as the Five Days of Milan.

The museum was founded on a collection of documents on the Risorgimento, gathered for the Exhibition of Turin in 1884 and then moved to the showroom at Milan’s Public Gardens. The exhibition was later transferred to the Rocchetta rooms at the Sforza Castle, where it was officially inaugurated on 24 June 1896. In 1943, due to the war-time bombardment of the castle, the museum was temporarily moved to the estate of Casa Manzoni (home of the famed Italian poet and novelist Alessandro Manzoni). Finally in 1951 it was housed inside the Moriggia Palace, where it remains today.

The museum is part of the Civic Historical Collections. Its collections include Baldassare Verazzi's Episode from the Five Days and Francesco Hayez's 1840 Portrait of Emperor Ferdinand I of Austria. The permanent exhibition is displayed to follow the chronological order of events of the Risorgimento, leading the visitor through fifteen rooms, to which the new Weapons Room has been recently added. The latest refurbishment in 1998 included the redesign of the permanent exhibitions, to accentuate the highlights of the collections, particularly the relics.

The museum boasts the green-and-silver velvet cloak and the valuable regal insignia of Napoleon Bonaparte’s coronation, the banner of the Legione Lombarda Cacciatori a Cavallo (Lombard Legion on Horseback) and the first Italian flag. The last renovation saw the redesign of the lighting and information systems, as well as improvements to the ‘Romantic Garden’ behind the building.

=== Museum of the Risorgimento of Bologna ===
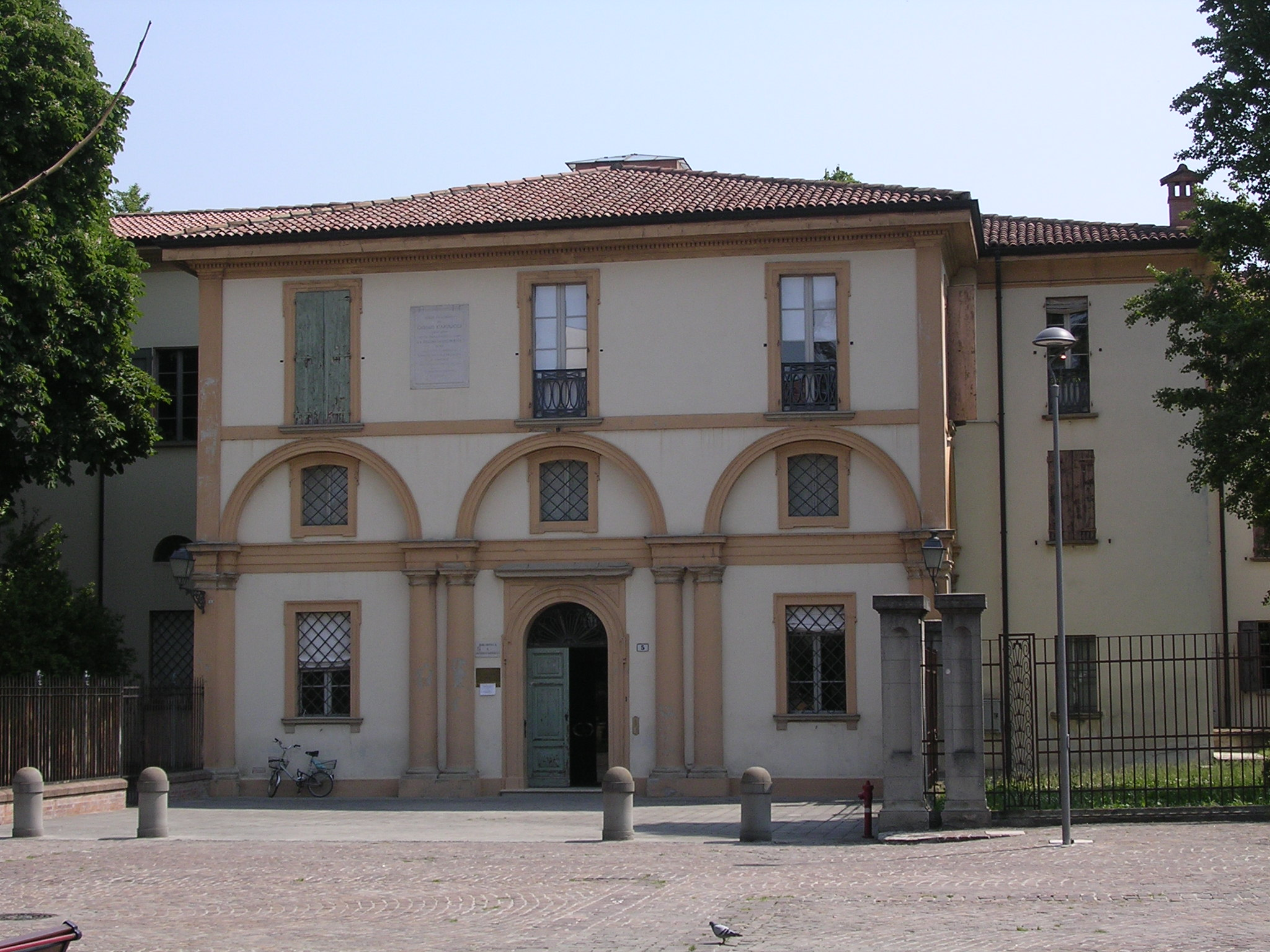
Civic Museum of the Risorgimento of Bologna

The Civic Museum of the Risorgimento of Bologna is located in the ground floor of the Casa Carducci, located in Piazza Carducci 5, in central Bologna.

Prior to being a Museum, part of the site had housed the church of the Madonna della Pietà, known commonly as the Madonna del Piombo (Virgin Mary of the Lead). It was so named because it contained a relief of the Madonna etched on a lead plate, attributed to Sperandio Savelli, that had gained veneration. There is also a legend that in the first years of the 16th century the icon had been discovered by youths playing here, near the city walls, and this led to the first chapel, then church.

This church burned down in 1712, but was soon replaced by a frescoed oratory completed in 1752. This oratory whose facade is represented by the three round arches with double central pilasters. After the Napoleonic occupation, the members of the company who owned the oratory had the structure deconsecrated and the contents sold off to antiquarians. The oratory had been decorated by the artists Antonio Rossi, Ercole Graziani the Younger, Gaetano Ferratini, Giuseppe Orsoni, Antonio Gionima, and Lorenzo Garbieri.

A Bolognese Museum of the Risorgimento was first inaugurated on 12 June 1893. The museum has exhibits that chronicle the history from the Napoleonic invasions to the end of the First World War. The main exhibits are divided into 5 eras:

- The Napoleonic Era (1796-1814)
- The Restoration of Papal States (1815-1848)
- The Epic of the Risorgimento (1848-1860)
- The Unification of Italy (1860-1914)
- Bologna at War (1915-1918)

The Museum houses a library of documents and an archive of diverse items from the period. It houses the a project towards maintenance of the city's monumental cemetery at the Certosa di Bologna.

The museum has varied in scope and themes across the decades. The initial founding of the museum focused on the patriotic events leading to Italian sovereignty and union. During and after the First World War, this conflict was defined as the Fourth War of Independence. Fascism added to the focus, the ideals of a greater Italy, the aggressive colonial wars that led to the formation of Italian East Africa, the Italian intervention in the Spanish Civil War, and the Second World War. The museum first closed in 1943, and did not reopen until 1954. Fascist wars and goals were now removed as a focus, and the Resistance to Fascism was viewed as the Second Risorgimento. The museum closed again from 1962 to 1975, and now focuses on the history prior to the Italy's entry into World War II.

The museum was located in the present Casa Carducci premises only in 1990, and includes the premises of the oratory. The Casa Carducci was the last home of the poet Giosuè Carducci, who was awarded the Nobel Prize in literature in 1906.

=== Tricolour Flag Museum ===
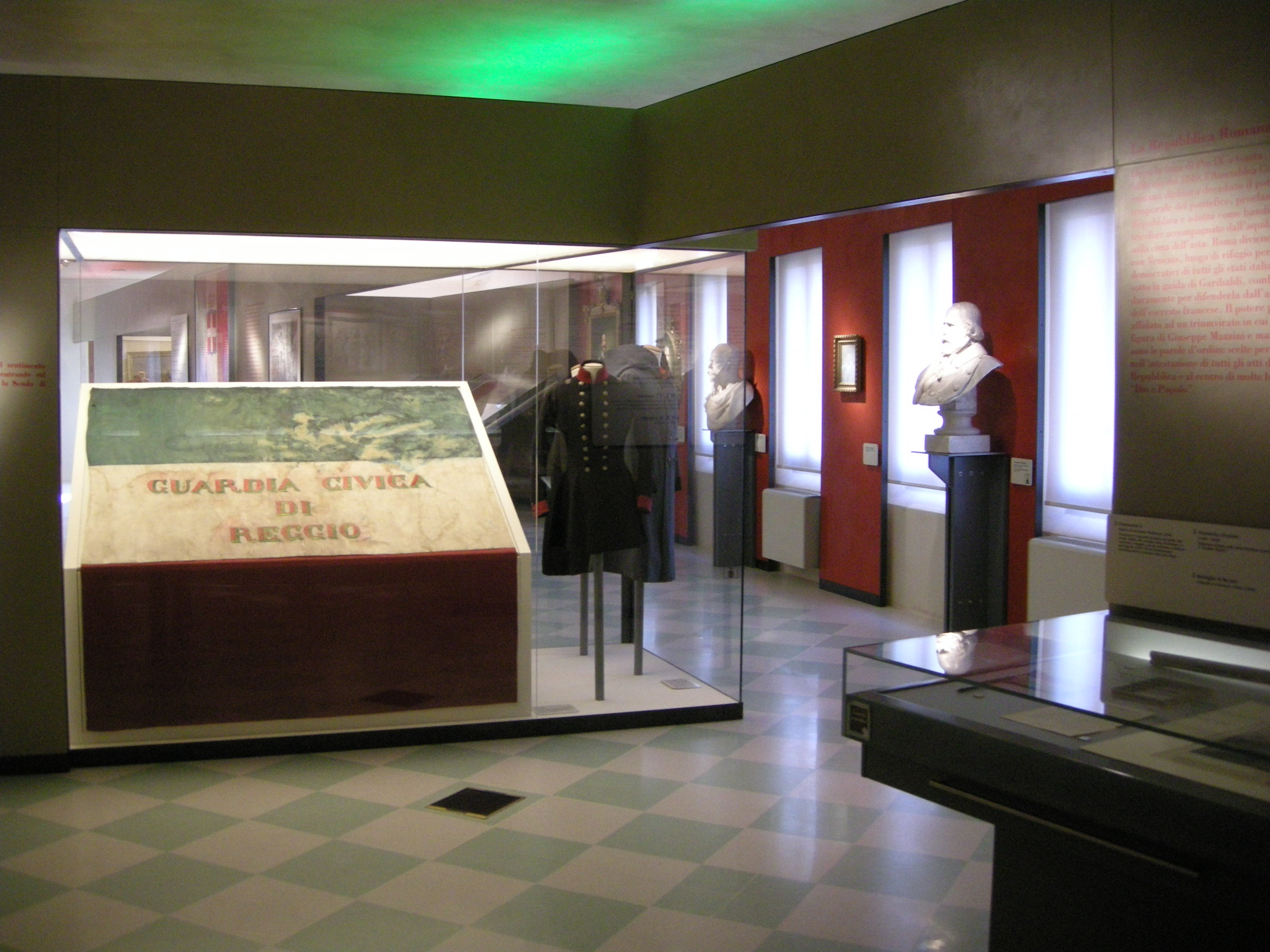
Tricolour Flag Museum

The Tricolour Flag Museum is located in Reggio nell'Emilia, the city that saw the birth of the Italian flag in 1797, inside the town hall of the city, adjacent to the Sala del Tricolore, whose collection is made up of relics related to the Italian flag.

The museum reconstructs the history of the Italian flag, which was adopted in Reggio Emilia for the first time, right in the nearby Sala del Tricolore. On 7 January 1797 it was in fact chosen as the national flag of the Cispadane Republic: for the first time the tricolour became the national flag of a sovereign Italian state. In fact, previously, the tricolour was used as a war flag and as a civic symbol of local authorities. It was inspired by the French flag, which at the time was a symbol of freedom against the states of the ancien régime.

Inaugurated on 7 January 2004, it preserves documents, relics and Italian flags ranging from the arrival of Napoleon Bonaparte in Reggio Emilia (1796) to its fall (1814), and others from the subsequent Italian unification period. The part of the museum that houses the latter was inaugurated on 7 January 2006. The dating of the relics preserved goes back to 1897, the year of the first centenary of the Italian flag. There are also a large number of tricolor flags of the Italian pre-unification States.

== Maps of Italy before and during Italian unification ==
Italy in 1494

Italy in 1796

Italy in 1843

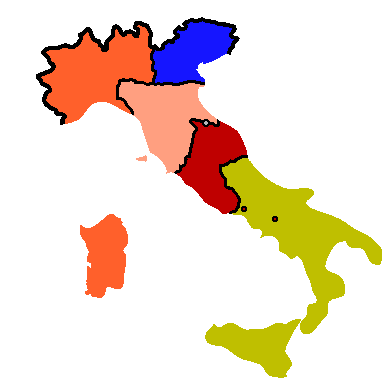
Italy in 1860: orange Kingdom of Sardinia, blue Kingdom of Lombardy–Venetia (Austrian Empire), pink United Provinces of Central Italy, red Papal States, pale green Kingdom of Two Sicilies

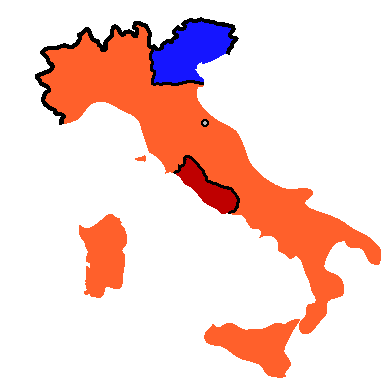
Italy in 1861: orange Kingdom of Italy, blue Kingdom of Lombardy–Venetia (Austrian Empire), red Papal States

Kingdom of Italy in 1870, showing the Papal States, before the Capture of Rome

Kingdom of Italy in 1871

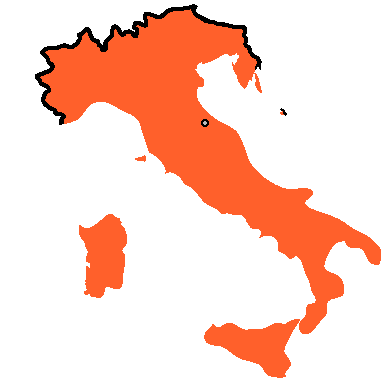
Kingdom of Italy in 1919

== See also ==
- Timeline of the unification of Italy
- German unification
- Formation of Romania

== Bibliography ==
- Ascoli, Albert Russell; Von Henneberg, Krystyna (2001). Ascoli, Albert Russell; Von Henneberg, Krystyna (eds.). Making and Remaking Italy: The Cultivation of National Identity around the Risorgimento. Oxford, England: Berg. Archived from the original on 19 October 2014 – via Questia.
- Beales, Derek; Biagini, Eugenio (2003). The Risorgimento and the Unification of Italy (2 ed.). Longman. ISBN 978-0-582-36958-0.
- Carter, Nick, ed. (2015). Britain, Ireland and the Italian Risorgimento. doi:10.1057/9781137297723. ISBN 978-1-349-67130-4.
- Clark, Martin (2010). The Italian Risorgimento. doi:10.4324/9781315833699. ISBN 978-1-315-83369-9.
- Collier, Martin, Italian Unification, 1820–71 (Heinemann, 2003); textbook, 156 pages excerpt
- Davis, John A., ed. (2000). Italy in the nineteenth century: 1796–1900. London: Oxford University Press. Archived from the original on 29 June 2011 – via Questia.
- De Mattei, Roberto. Pius IX (2004).
- Gilmour, David (2011). The Pursuit of Italy: A History of a Land, Its Regions, and Their Peoples. Macmillan + ORM. ISBN 978-1-4668-0154-7.
- Hearder, Harry (1983). Italy in the Age of the Risorgimento, 1790-1870. Longman. ISBN 978-0-582-49146-5.
- Holt, Edgar (1971). The Making of Italy, 1815-1870. Atheneum. OCLC 568721759.
- Körner, Axel. America in Italy: The United States in the Political Thought and Imagination of the Risorgimento, 1763–1865 (Princeton UP, 2017)
- Mack Smith, Denis (1969). Italy: A Modern History. University of Michigan Press. ISBN 978-0-472-07051-0.
- Mack Smith, Denis. Cavour (1985)
- Mack Smith, Denis (1996). Mazzini. Yale University Press. ISBN 978-0-300-06884-9.
- Mack Smith, Denis (1971). Victor Emanuel, Cavour and the Risorgimento. Oxford University Press. ISBN 978-0-19-212550-7.
- Martinengo-Cesaresco, Countess Evelyn. The Liberation of Italy, 1815-1870. (1895; 4th edition 1915)
- Mendola, Louis. The Kingdom of Sicily 1130–1860 (2015).
- Moe, Nelson J. (2002). The View from Vesuvius: Italian Culture and the Southern Question. University of California Press. ISBN 978-0-520-93982-0.
- Mowat, R.B. A history of European diplomacy, 1815–1914 (1922) pp 115–63 online free
- Patriarca, S.; Riall, L. (2011). The Risorgimento Revisited: Nationalism and Culture in Nineteenth-Century Italy. Springer. ISBN 978-0-230-36275-8. Review: Romani, Roberto (July 2014). "Silvana Patriarca and Lucy Riall, eds, The Risorgimento Revisited: Nationalism and Culture in Nineteenth-Century Italy". European History Quarterly. 44 (3): 565–566. doi:10.1177/0265691414537193ai.
- Pearce, Robert, and Andrina Stiles. Access to History: The Unification of Italy 1789–1896 (4th rf., Hodder Education, 2015), textbook. excerpt
- Pozzo, Barbara (2013). "Masculinity Italian style". Nevada Law Journal. 13 (2): 15.
- Procacci, Giuliano. History of the Italian People (Pelican, London, 1973) Trans Anthony Paul.
- Raponi, Danilo (2014). Religion and Politics in the Risorgimento. doi:10.1057/9781137342980. ISBN 978-1-349-46543-9.
- Riall, Lucy (2002). The Italian Risorgimento. doi:10.4324/9780203412343. ISBN 978-0-203-41234-3.
- Riall, Lucy. Garibaldi: Invention of a hero (Yale UP, 2008).
- Riall, Lucy (1998). "Hero, saint or revolutionary? Nineteenth-century politics and the cult of Garibaldi". Modern Italy. 3 (2): 191–204. doi:10.1080/13532949808454803. S2CID 143746713.
- Ridley, Jasper Godwin (1976). Garibaldi. Viking Press. ISBN 978-0-670-33548-0.
- Sarlin, Simon (2009). "Fighting the Risorgimento: foreign volunteers in southern Italy (1860–63)". Journal of Modern Italian Studies. 14 (4): 476–490. doi:10.1080/13545710903281987. S2CID 144416217.
- Thayer, William Roscoe (1911). The Life and Times of Cavour vol 1. old interpretations but useful on details; vol 1 goes to 1859]; volume 2 online covers 1859–62
- Trevelyan, George Macaulay (1907). Garibaldi's Defence of the Roman Republic. Longmans, Green and Company. "garibaldi trevelyan."
- Trevelyan, George Macaulay (1909). Garibaldi and the Thousand. Longmans, Green and Company. "garibaldi trevelyan."
- Trevelyan, George Macaulay (1911). Garibaldi and the Making of Italy. Longmans, Green and Company. "garibaldi trevelyan."
- Wawro, Geoffrey (January 1996). "Austria Versus the Risorgimento: A New Look at Austria's Italian Strategy in the 1860s". European History Quarterly. 26 (1): 7–29. doi:10.1177/026569149602600102.
- Woolf, Stuart Joseph. The Italian Risorgimento (1969).
- Woolf, Stuart. A History of Italy 1700–1860: The Social Constraints of Political Change (1960), 519 pp
- Wright, Owain (2012). "British foreign policy and the Italian occupation of Rome, 1870". The International History Review. 34 (1): 161–176. doi:10.1080/07075332.2012.668343. S2CID 154971989.
- Massimo Colella, Luigi Russo interprete di Vincenzo Cuoco. Un inedito corso universitario, in «Otto/Novecento», 2020, pp. 153–187.

=== Historiography ===
- Alio, Jacqueline; Mendola, Louis (2018). Sicilian Studies: A Guide and Syllabus for Educators. Trinacria Editions. ISBN 978-1-943639-18-2.
- Bouchard, Norma (2005). Risorgimento in Modern Italian Culture: Revisiting the Nineteenth-century Past in History, Narrative, and Cinema. Fairleigh Dickinson University Press. ISBN 978-0-8386-4054-8.
- Francesco, Antonino De (2013). The Antiquity of the Italian Nation: The Cultural Origins of a Political Myth in Modern Italy, 1796-1943. OUP Oxford. ISBN 978-0-19-966231-9.
- Isabella, Maurizio (2012). "Rethinking Italy's Nation-Building 150 Years Afterwards: The New Risorgimento Historiography". Past & Present (217): 247–268. doi:10.1093/pastj/gts028. JSTOR 23324209.
- Manenti, Luca G., "Italian Freemasonry from the Eighteenth Century to Unification. Protagonists, Metamorphoses, Interpretations", in History of the Grand Orient of Italy, edited by E. Locci (Washington D.C., Westphalia Press, 2019), pp. 27–60.
- Ramm, Agatha (1972). "The Risorgimento in Sicily: Recent Literature". The English Historical Review. 87 (345): 795–811. doi:10.1093/ehr/LXXXVII.CCCXLV.795. JSTOR 562204.
- Rao, Anna Maria (2016). "Napoleonic Italy: Old and New Trends in Historiography". Napoleon's Empire. pp. 84–97. doi:10.1057/9781137455475_6. ISBN 978-1-349-56731-7.
- Salsini, Laura A. (March 2008). "Re-envisioning the Risorgimento: Isabella Bossi Fedrigotti's Amore mio uccidi Garibaldi". Forum Italicum: A Journal of Italian Studies. 42 (1): 83–98. doi:10.1177/001458580804200105.

=== Italian ===
- Alio, Jacqueline. Sicilian Studies: A Guide and Syllabus for Educators (2018), 250 pp.
- Bacchin, Elena. Italofilia. Opinione pubblica britannica e il Risorgimento italiano 1847–1864 (Turin, Carocci editore, 2014), 266 pp
- Banti, Alberto Mario. La nazione del Risorgimento: parentela, santità e onore alle origini dell'Italia unita. Torino, Einaudi, 2000
- Banti, Alberto Mario. Il Risorgimento italiano. Roma-Bari, Laterza, 2004 (Quadrante Laterza; 125)
- Ghisalberti, Carlo. Istituzioni e società civile nell'età del Risorgimento. Roma-Bari, Laterza, 2005 (Biblioteca universale Laterza; 575)
- Della Peruta, Franco. L'Italia del Risorgimento: problemi, momenti e figure. Milano, Angeli, 1997 (Saggi di storia; 14)
- Peruta, Franco Della (1989). Conservatori, liberali e democratici nel Risorgimento. F. Angeli. ISBN 978-88-204-3562-2.
- De Rosa, Luigi. La provincia subordinata. Saggio sulla questione meridionale, Bari, Laterza, 2004
- Guerra, Nicola (2009). Eclettica (ed.). Controrisorgimento. Il movimento filoestense apuano e lunigianese. Nicola Guerra. ISBN 978-8890416804.
- Guerra, Nicola (2012). Le due anime del processo di unificazione nazionale: La necessità di un nuovo approccio di ricerca ancora disatteso. GRIN Verlag. ISBN 978-3-656-21576-9.
- Scirocco, Alfonso. L'Italia del risorgimento: 1800–1860. (vol. 1 di Storia d'Italia dall'unità alla Repubblica), Bologna, Il mulino, 1990
- Scirocco, Alfonso. In difesa del Risorgimento. Bologna, Il mulino, 1998 (Collana di storia contemporanea)
- Tomaz, Luigi. Il confine d'Italia in Istria e Dalmazia, Presentazione di Arnaldo Mauri, Conselve, Think ADV, 2008.
- Carlo Cardia, Risorgimento e religione, Giappichelli, Torino, 2011, ISBN 978-88-348-2552-5.
