= Zanetti =

Zanetti is a surname of Italian origin. Notable people with the surname include:

- Adriana Serra Zanetti (born 1976), Italian professional tennis player
- Aheda Zanetti (born 1967), Lebanese-born Australian fashion designer
- Antonella Serra Zanetti (born 1980), Italian professional tennis player
- Antonio Zanetti (1754–1812), Italian painter
- Antonio Maria Zanetti (1679–1767), Venetian art critic, connoisseur and collector
- Antonio Maria Zanetti (the younger) (1706–1778), Venetian art historian and custodian of the Marciana Library
- Arthur Zanetti (born 1990), Brazilian athlete
- Cristiano Zanetti (born 1977), Italian professional football player
- Denis Zanette (1970–2003), Italian professional racing cyclist
- Enrico Zanetti (born 1973), Italian politician and tax advisor
- Eugenio Zanetti (born 1949), Argentine dramatist, painter, film set designer, and theater and opera director
- Gasparo Zanetti (after 1600–1660), Italian violin teacher and composer
- Giacomo Zanetti (1696–1735), Italian master builder and architect
- Gianluca Zanetti (born 1977), Italian professional football player
- Giuseppe Miti Zanetti (1859–1929), Italian painter and engraver
- Gregory Zanetti, (contemporary), United States Army general officer
- Javier Zanetti (born 1973), Argentine professional football player
- José Vela Zanetti (1913–1999), Spanish painter and muralist
- Leopoldina Zanetti Borzino (1826–1902), Italian painter and printmaker
- Lorenzo Zanetti (born 1987), Italian motorcycle racer
- Marco Zanetti (born 1962), Italian professional billiards player
- Massimo Zanetti (born 1948), Italian former politician, owner of Segafredo and Massimo Zanetti Beverage Group
- Mauro Zanetti (born 1973), former Italian cyclist
- Melanie Zanetti (born 1985), Australian actress, voice of Chilli in Bluey
- Michela Zanetti (born 1991), Italian football forward
- Monica Zanetti, Australian filmmaker, writer and director of Ellie & Abbie (& Ellie's Dead Aunt) (2020)
- Monique Zanetti (born 1961), French soprano
- Paolo Zanetti (born 1982), Italian professional football player
- Paul Zanette (born 1988), Italian-Canadian hockey player
- Paul Zanetti (born 1961), Australian political cartoonist
- Paulo Zanetti (born 1952), former international freestyle swimmer from Brazil
- Rebecca Zanetti, New York Times and USA Today bestselling author of paranormal romance
- Roberto Zanetti (stage name Savage, born 1956), Italian singer and music producer
- Roberto Zanetti (politician) (born 1954), Italian politician
- Rosanna Zanetti (born 1988), Venezuelan actress
- Sebastiano Zanetti, Italian coxswain and medalist
- Sergio Zanetti (born 1967), Argentine professional football player
- Sol Zanetti (born 1982), Canadian politician and Representative of Quebec
- Tom Zanetti (born 1989), English musician
- Veronique Zanetti (born 1959), German professor of Political Philosophy
- Vittore Zanetti Zilla (1864–1946), Italian painter

Fictional characters

- Bubba Zanetti, fictional character of Mad Max, 1979 Australian dystopian action film directed by George Miller

== See also ==
- Zanette, a surname
- Zinetti, a surname
