= Flag of the Republic of San Marco =

National flag

- Adopted: 1848
- Design: Tricolour with canton

The Flag of the Republic of San Marco is a tricolour with three vertical stripes of green, white, and red. The canton features a Lion of Saint Mark within a frame of diagonal red, white, and green stripes.

Following a revolt in the Kingdom of Lombardy–Venetia in 1848 and the declaration of independence for the Republic of San Marco by Venetian separatists, the flag was adopted as a symbol of the new republic.

Daniele Manin, President of the republic, decreed on 21 March 1848 that the flag should represent the new republic following the end of Austrian rule. The reinstatement of the Lion of Saint Mark was an outward expression of Venetian independence from Austria. By including the traditional flag of the Republic of Venice, the insurrectionists simultaneously demonstrated continuity with the previous republic alongside newfound independence.

The usage of a green-white-red tricolour as the basis of the flag was also significant insofar as it signified greater links between the republic and the wider Italian independence movement.

The flag lasted until 27 August 1849 when the Republic of San Marco was returned to Austrian control following the decisive Battle of Novara.
