= Flag of Veneto =

Regione del Veneto
- Use: Civil and state flag
- Proportion: 2:3
- Adopted: 20 May 1975 (modified in 1999)
- Design: The arms of Regione del Veneto on a Pompeian red background; on the fly edge, seven tails bearing the coat of arms of the seven province capitals of Veneto.

The flag of the Italian region of Veneto derives from the flag historically used by the Republic of Venice (697–1797), a maritime republic centered on the modern city of Venice. The modern flag was adopted by legge regionale (regional law) 20 maggio 1975, n. 56 and amended by L.R. del 22 febbraio 1999, which deleted the words "Regione del Veneto".

The main overall layout and design of the Venetian banner was kept. The coat of arms of the Region is set in a square in the center of the flag: the Lion of Saint Mark with the opened gospel (reading the Latin motto Pax tibi Marce evangelista meus, "Peace to you Mark, my evangelist") rests its paws on the landscape of Veneto: sea (the Adriatic), land (the Venetian Plain) and mountains (the Alps).
