= Siege of Venice =

Siege of Venice may refer to:

- Siege of Venice (1813–1814) – Sixth Coalition against Napoleonic Italy
- Siege of Venice (1848–1849) – Austria against the Republic of San Marco
