= Spilimbergo (surname) =

Spilimbergo is a surname. Notable people with the surname include:

- Irene di Spilimbergo (1538–1559), Italian painter and poet
- Jorge Enea Spilimbergo (1928–2004), Argentine politician and journalist
- Lino Enea Spilimbergo (1896–1964), Argentine painter and engraver

== See also ==
- Spilimbergo, comune located in the Friuli-Venezia Giulia region, Italy
