= Zenetti =

Zenetti is a surname of Italian origin. Notable people with the surname include:

- Leopold von Zenetti (1805–1892), Austrian composer
- Lothar Zenetti (1926–2019), German Catholic theologian, priest, and author of books and poetry

== See also ==
- Zanetti
