= Flag of the Republic of Venice =

Flag of the city-state of Venice, 8th–18th centuries

- Other names: Banner of St. Mark, Standard of St. Mark
- Proportion: 1∶2
- Relinquished: 1797
- Design: A gold Lion of St. Mark on a field of dark red accompanied by six sestiere on the fly
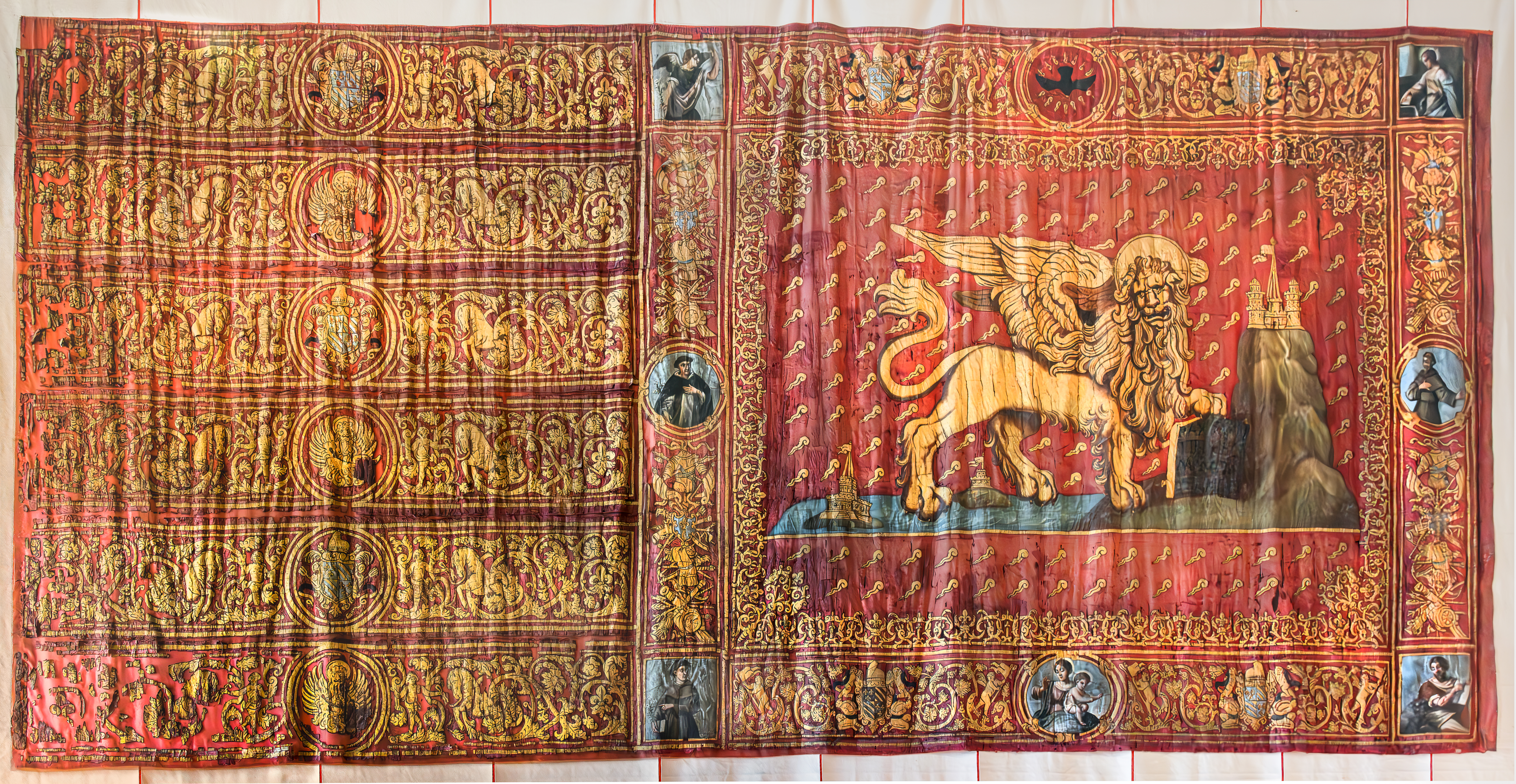
- The original version of the year 1659 at the Museo Correr

The Flag of the Republic of Venice, commonly known as the Banner or Standard of Saint Mark (stendardo di San Marco), was the symbol of the Republic of Venice, until its dissolution in 1797.

Its main charge was the Lion of Saint Mark, symbolizing Mark the Evangelist, the patron saint of Venice. A distinguishing feature of the flag is its six fringes, which were added to represent the original six sestiere of Venice. The fringes also serve to prevent damage being caused to the central section of the flag by wind.

During times of peace, the Lion of Saint Mark was depicted alongside an open book. However, when the Republic was at war the Bible was replaced with the lion grasping an upright sword. During the corteo dogale (lit. 'procession of the doges'), four banners of Saint Mark with different background colours, white, purple, blue, and red, were carried, with the one in front representing the state of the republic at that time (at peace, in a truce, in an alliance, at war, respectively). When at war, the war version of the Lion of Saint Mark was used.

The flag inspired the modern flag of the Veneto region in Italy.

== History ==
It is unclear as to when the republic officially adopted the flag. One chronicler, John the Deacon, described how in 998 Doge Pietro Orseolo II was presented with a "triumphale vexillum" (triumphal banner) before leading a naval expedition against the Narentines, pirates who moored off the eastern coast of the Adriatic and harassed Venetian seamen. However, this chronicle does not explicitly mention the use of the Lion of Saint Mark within the flag or mention the colours used upon the banner.

The first recorded use of the Lion of Saint Mark on a red field by the Venetians dates back to the late thirteenth century. Genoese archivist Jacobus de Voragine makes reference to the Lion of Saint Mark as the official symbol for Venice. He also mentions how the phrase "PAX TIBI MARCE EVANGELISTA MEUS" was found on the flag.

The winged lion was chosen as a symbol of Venice due to its connotations with Saint Mark. Venetian tradition states how Saint Mark was travelling from Aquileia to Rome when an Angel appeared whilst he was in the lagoon of Venice and stated 'Pax tibi, Marce, evangelista meus. Hic requiescet corpus tuum' (Peace be with thee, O Mark, my evangelist. Here thy body will rest). The legend was used in 828 by Venetian merchants Rustico da Torcello and Bon da Malamocco to justify their journey to Alexandria to take the corpse of Saint Mark to Venice and inter it within the city. From that moment Saint Mark became the patron saint of Venice and thus began the association between the city and the winged lion.

Vexillologist Whitney Smith suggests that the colours chosen, red and gold, were selected on the basis that they were the colours of the Byzantine Empire, the previous rulers of the region.

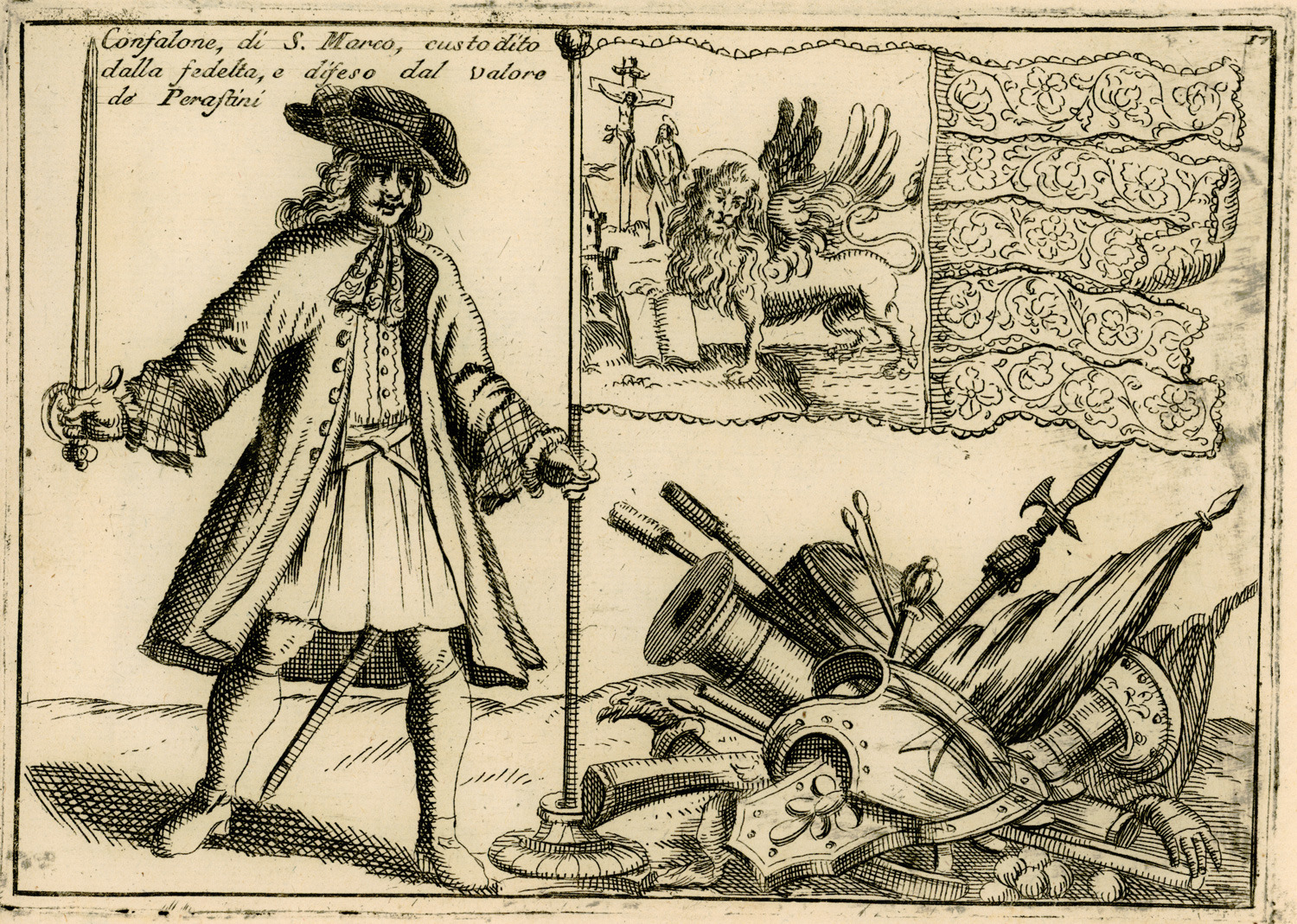
Gonfalon of Saint Mark and Gonfaloniere from Perasto, 1680s

For 337 years 12 Gonfalonieri, mercenaries from Perast (modern day Montenegro), were appointed by the Venetian senate to guard the flag of the Republic at all times on the pain of death. 8 were executed in 1571 after the Battle of Lepanto for failing to protect it.

Following the fall of the Republic of Venice in May 1797 by France and Austria, the Lion of Saint Mark was suppressed throughout Venice. As a result, the traditional flag of the Republic of Venice was abolished and replaced with two equal horizontal bands of blue on top of yellow.

The last place where the flag was used as a symbol of the Republic was Perast, in Venetian Albania, a town faithful to Venice. Perast continued to celebrate its loyalty to Venice for several months by continuing to fly the flag. On 23 August 1797, the Austrian navy arrived in the town and the Banner of St. Mark was hauled down for the last time. Captain Joko Viskovich made a speech in the local language, stating "The history of this day will be known throughout all Europe, how Perast has maintained, with dignity, to the very end, the honour of the Venetian flag, honouring it with this solemn act, lowering it to the ground, bathed in our universal and bitter tears."

Usage of the Lion of Saint Mark in the flag of Venice would not return until 1848, when it appeared in the canton of the flag of the Republic of San Marco.

== Modern usage ==
The flag enjoys continued usage throughout the city of Venice. It can be found flying from the balconies of homes, hotels, and government offices. Some residents of the city also elect to fly the flag as an ensign from the stern of private boats, whilst some gondoliers choose to attach the flag to their gondola. On some occasions, the flag of the Republic of Venice flies atop a flagpole outside St. Mark's Basilica in Piazza San Marco.

Even if it is not the flag of the Veneto region, it is preferred by people and institutions across the entire region because of its symbolic meaning of the unity of Venetian people and the historic heritage of the Republic of Venice. The flag can be seen in many other cities as Verona and Treviso, but it is used in some towns from Friuli too, once under the rule of Venice. The Venetian people tend to recognize themselves in this flag, which has become the true symbol of their unity.

Usage of the flag has also been adopted as a symbol by some claiming to represent the Venetian regionalist movement.

The flag of the Republic of Venice appears alongside the flag of Genoa, the Cross of Pisa, and the flag of the Republic of Amalfi on the ensign of the Italian navy.

== Gallery ==
Historical flags of the municipality

1879–1942

1942–1947 de facto; 1997 de jure

1922 de facto – 1997 de facto

1997–present

Historical flags of the republic

State flags

Flag of the Republic of Venice, showing the Lion of Saint Mark holding a Bible, associated with peace.

Flag of the Republic of Venice, showing the Lion of Saint Mark holding a sword, associated with war.

Heraldic Standard of 1648

Official flag of the Republic of Venice used by the Doge Domenico Contarini (1659–1675)

Flag of the Republic of San Marco (1848–1849)

Naval and land fortifications flags

12th–13th centuries (Note: The flag depicts Saint Mark the Evangelist, the patron saint of Venice)

14th century (Note: Flags depicting the lion of Saint Mark on a white field are dated as early as 1355–56. Similar flags can be seen in contemporary sources like in the portolan chart attributed to A. Dulcert)

14th–18th centuries (Note: Sometimes the lion – with or without a halo – holds a closed bible, or a bible without writing. Sometimes it also holds a cross or a sword.)

18th century – 1797

Infantry regimental standard adopted on 26 April 1729 under the reforms of Field Marshal Johann Matthias von der Schulenburg also used as a naval flag

== Additional images ==
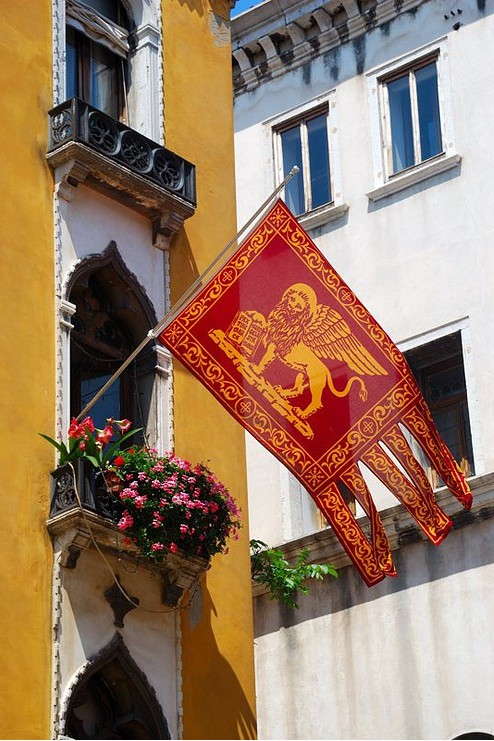
A modern-day replica of the flag flown from a balcony in Venice

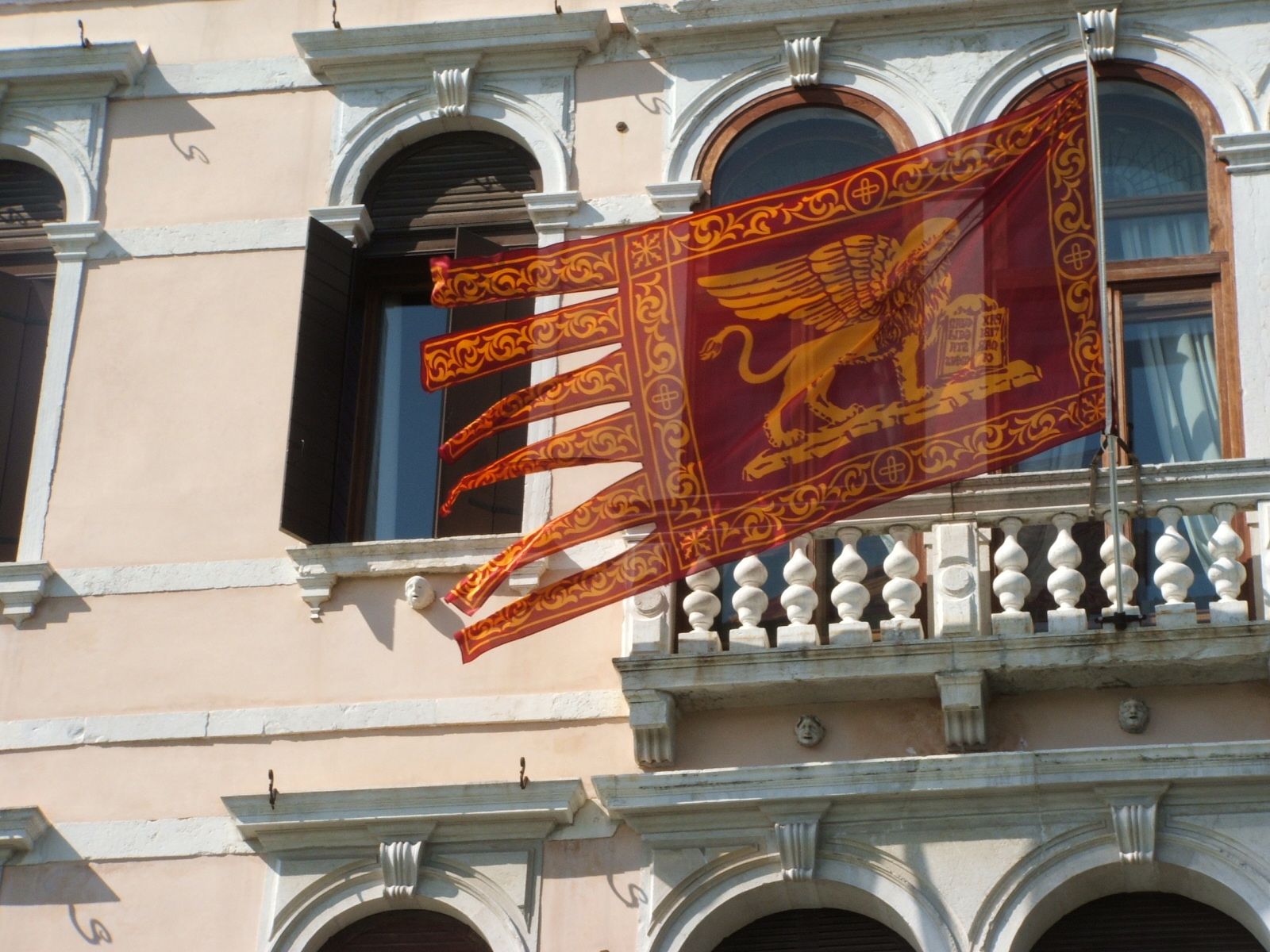

Flag of the Italian administrative region of Veneto (adopted in 1975)

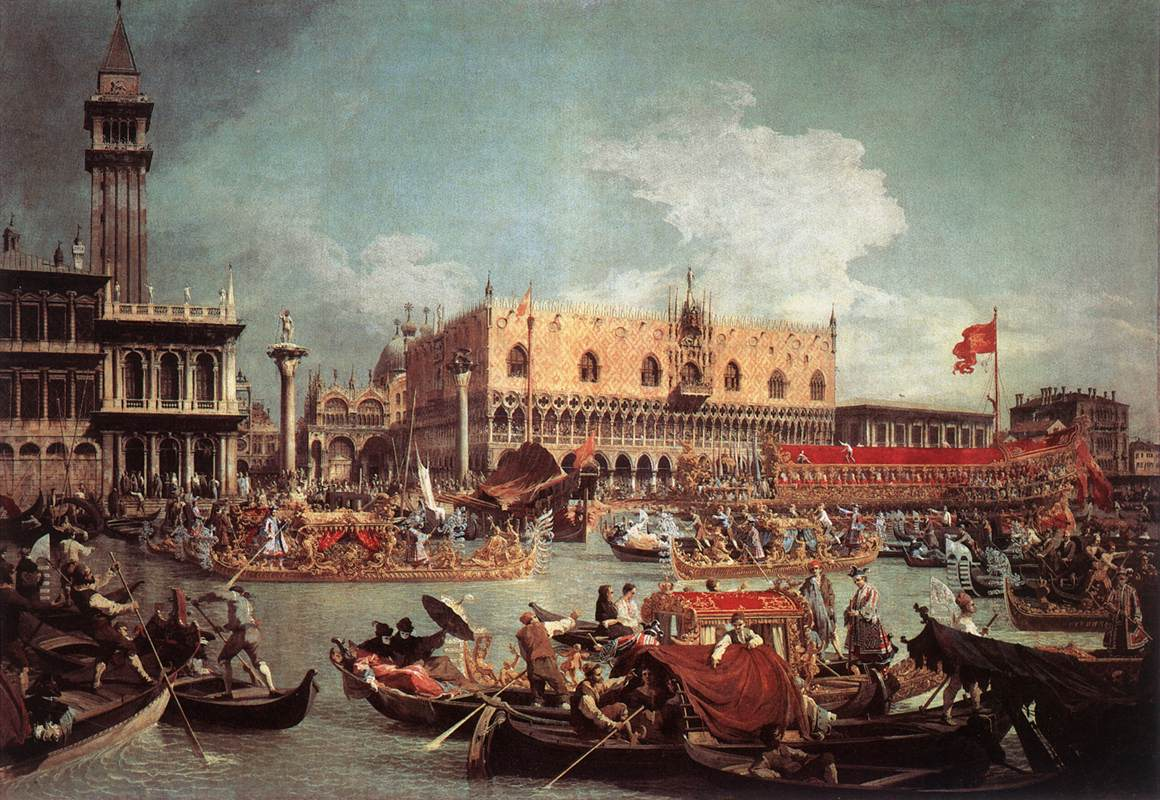
Canaletto (1730) - The venetian flag on the Bucintoro
