= Giovanni Battista Cavedalis =

Italian patriot (1794–1858)

Giovanni Battista Cavedalis (19 March 1794–16 July 1858) was an Italian patriot.

Cavedalis was born in Spilimbergo, in what is now the province of Pordenone. As a railway engineer, he was in charge of the construction of the railway between Vienna and Ljubljana. In 1848, he took part in the revolution in Venice and was one of the leaders of the Republic of San Marco.
