= Veronique Zanetti =

German professor

Véronique Zanetti (born 16 August 1959) is a Swiss and German philosopher and professor of political philosophy at Bielefeld University. Her research focuses on political philosophy, ethics, philosophy of international relations, and questions concerning justice, war, humanitarian intervention, and political compromise.

== Early life and education ==
Zanetti was born in Lausanne, Switzerland, in 1959. She studied philosophy, English literature, and musicology at the University of Geneva. From 1985 to 1987, she worked as a research assistant at the University of Siegen. She subsequently worked at the University of Bern, where she was a research assistant to the philosopher Gerhard Seel from 1988 to 1993. She received her doctorate there in 1993 with a dissertation on teleology in the philosophy of Immanuel Kant. From 1994 to 1997, she worked at the University of Fribourg in Switzerland with Jean-Claude Wolf. She completed her habilitation in 2001.

== Academic career ==
Zanetti is a professor of political philosophy at Bielefeld University. Her research and teaching have focused on political and moral philosophy, philosophy of international relations, political obligations, democracy, and the relationship between law and morality. She has also supervised research on subjects including refugee health care, complicity, responsibility for unjust working conditions, and reparative approaches to criminal law. From 2003 to 2015, Zanetti was a member of the Swiss Federal Ethics Committee on Non-Human Biotechnology. From 2015 to 2023, she was a member of the directory board of Bielefeld University's Center for Interdisciplinary Research (ZiF). She became its managing director in 2017 and was also involved with the international network of University-Based Institutes for Advanced Studies (UBIAS).From 2016 to 2019, she participated in an interdisciplinary working group on international justice and institutional responsibility at the Berlin-Brandenburg Academy of Sciences and Humanities. From 2020 to 2023, she has participated in its follow-up working group on the normative foundations of democracy. She has also served on the Democracy advisory board of the Gerda Henkel Foundation.

== Research ==
Zanetti's research focuses on political philosophy and philosophy of international relations. Her work addresses international justice, armed conflict, humanitarian intervention, political obligations, democracy, and the relationship between morality and law. She has also written on compromise as a subject of political and moral philosophy.

In 2015, she was awarded the Opus Magnum Fellowship by the Volkswagen Foundation for a monograph on moral and political compromises. The 2022 book Spielarten des Kompromisses (Varieties of Compromise) examines different forms of compromise in individual and collective decision-making, politics, ethics, and law. The book develops a classification of different kinds of compromise and considers the conditions under which compromise can provide a way of dealing with conflicting interests and values.

Zanetti has continued this work in subsequent publications. She examines the possibilities offered by compromise in conflict negotiations, within democracy, in relation to climate ethics or to the ethics of war. In 2025, she published the chapter "Compromise in Politics and the Politics of Compromise: The Example of Switzerland" in History and Theory of Compromise. The chapter examines compromise in the context of political decision-making and the Swiss political system.

Her recent teaching and research have also included political obligations, civil disobedience, theories of democracy, libertarianism, punishment, migration, solidarity, and jus post bellum, the philosophical study of justice after war. Retired since October 2025.

== Selected publications ==
- 2025. "Compromise in Politics and the Politics of Compromise: The Example of Switzerland" in History and Theory of Compromise, ed. Jan-Hendryk de Boer et al.
- 2023. Das Paradox moralischer Kompromisse“ [The Paradox of Moral Compromises]. Weiter denken. Journal für Philosophie, 4-10.
- 2022. Spielarten des Kompromisses [Varieties of Compromise], Berlin Suhrkamp.
- 2020. Proportionality and Compromises. Journal of Moral Philosophy 17(1): 75-97.
- 2019. The Jus Post Bellum and the Responsibility toward Refugees of War In: International Gerechtigkeit und Institutionelle Verantwortung. Nida-Rümelin J, von Daniels D, Wloka N (Eds); Berlin-Brandenburgische Akademie der Wissenschaften: Forschungsberichte, 41. Berlin: de Gruyter: 293-308.
- 2014. Philosophie der internationalen Politik : zur Einführung [Philosophy of International Politics: An Introduction]. Dietrich F, Zanetti V, Hamburg: Junius.
- 2011. Justice, Peace and Compromise. Analyse & Kritik 2011(2): 423-439.
- 2010. Kollektive Verantwortung und internationale Beziehungen [Collective Responsibility and International Relations]. Gerber D, Zanetti V (Eds) Frankfurt: Suhrkamp.
- 2009. Immanuel Kant, Kritik der Urteilskraft : Schriften zur Ästhetik und Naturphilosophie ; Text und Kommentar]. [Critique of Judgement: Writings on Aesthetics and the Philosophy of Nature; Text and Commentary] Frank M, Zanetti V (Eds). Frankfurt am Main: Deutscher Klassiker-Verlag.
- 2008. L‘intervention humanitaire. Droits des individus, devoirs des États [Humanitarian intervention. Individual rights, State Responsibilities]. Geneva: Labor et Fides.
- 2007. Women, War and International Law. In Civilian Immunity in War, ed. I. Primoratz, 217–238. Oxford: Oxford University Press.
- 2005. Egalitarian Global Distributive Justice or Minimal Standard? Pogge's Position. In Real World Justice: Grounds, Principals, Human Rights, and Social Institutions, eds. A. Follesdal and T. Pogge, 199–214. Dordrecht: Springer.
- 1998. Ethik des Interventionsrechts [Ethics of the Right of Intervention]. In Politische Philosophie der internationalen Beziehungen, eds. C. Chwaszcza and W. Kersting, 297–324. Frankfurt a. M.: Suhrkamp Verlag.
