= Giovanni Battista Agneletti =

Italian composer

Giovanni Battista Agneletti (fl. 1656–1673) was an Italian composer.

== Biography ==
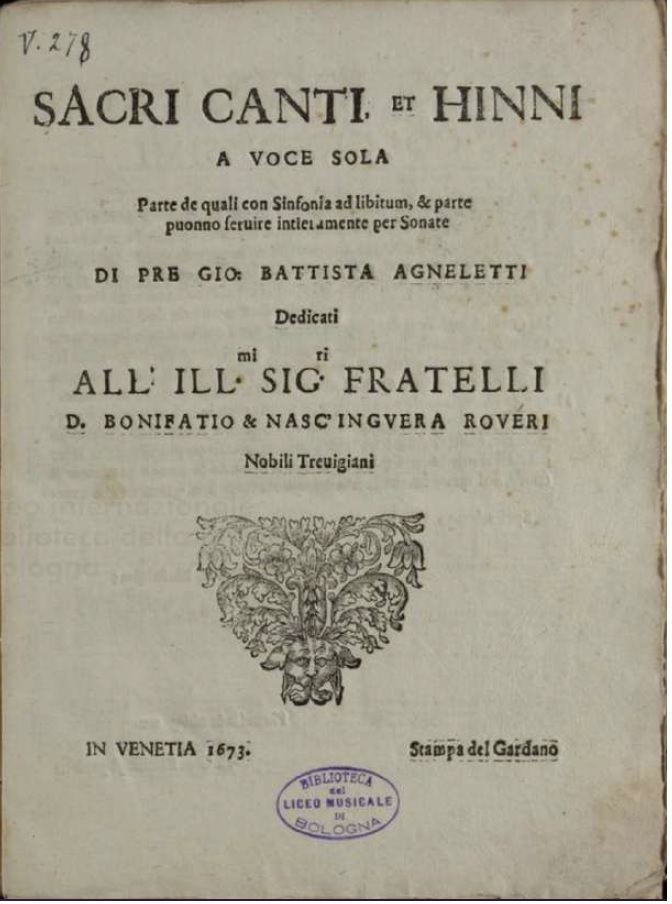
Sacri Canti et Hinni - A Voce Sola by Giovanni Battista Agneletti

Little is known about the life of Giovanni Battista Agneletti, though it is certain that he was born before 1656. Based on baptismal records and other documents, he was born in Spilimbergo.

Few of this composer's works have come down to us. Among these are two songs included in Arie a voce sola the diversi auttori, published in Venice in 1656, which may be regarded as Sacra Colonna's "secular counterpart", in which his songs had not been not included, and a Gloria, published in 1673 in the collection of motets Sacri Canti et Hinni (also published in Venice). The collection was dedicated to the Roveri brothers, two aristocrats from Treviso. The letter of dedication, in which Agneletti praises one of the Roveri's talent with the lute, is signed from Spilimbergo, and in the area there was a family with a surname spelled in this and other similar ways. It is possible to assume that Agneletti was somehow connected to Treviso, and that he settled in Venice. Other documents connect him to a family of musicians from Bassano, as well as to the noble families of Ottoboni and Contarini.

Based on Venetian documents, he had three brothers residing in Venice: Giovanni Maria, Nicolò, parish priest in Prata, Pordenone, and Giovanni Paolo, a shoemaker.

== Works ==
Beside the collection Sacri Canti et Hinni, published in 1673, there are also 2 arias published two decades earlier in the anthology Arie a voce sola the diversi auttori.

Agneletti also wrote a Chaconne in D minor. Both the Chaconne and Gloria was rearranged for trumpet (or flute) and organ by Michel Rondeau, both having been performed on 27 April 2021.

Recordings

In May 1999, Agneletti's Gloria patri et filio et spiritui sancto (Gloria) was recorded as a part of Canta La Maddalena, sung by Maria Cristina Kiehr and played by the Concerto Soave ensemble. The recording was released in 2000.
