= Zinetti =

Zinetti is an Italian surname. Notable people with the surname include:

- Giuseppe Zinetti (born 1958), Italian former professional football manager and former player
- Mauro Zinetti (born 1975), Italian former road cyclist

== See also ==
- Zanetti, a surname
