= Spilimbergo =

Spilimbergo Spilinberc (Friulian)
- Comune
- Città di Spilimbergo
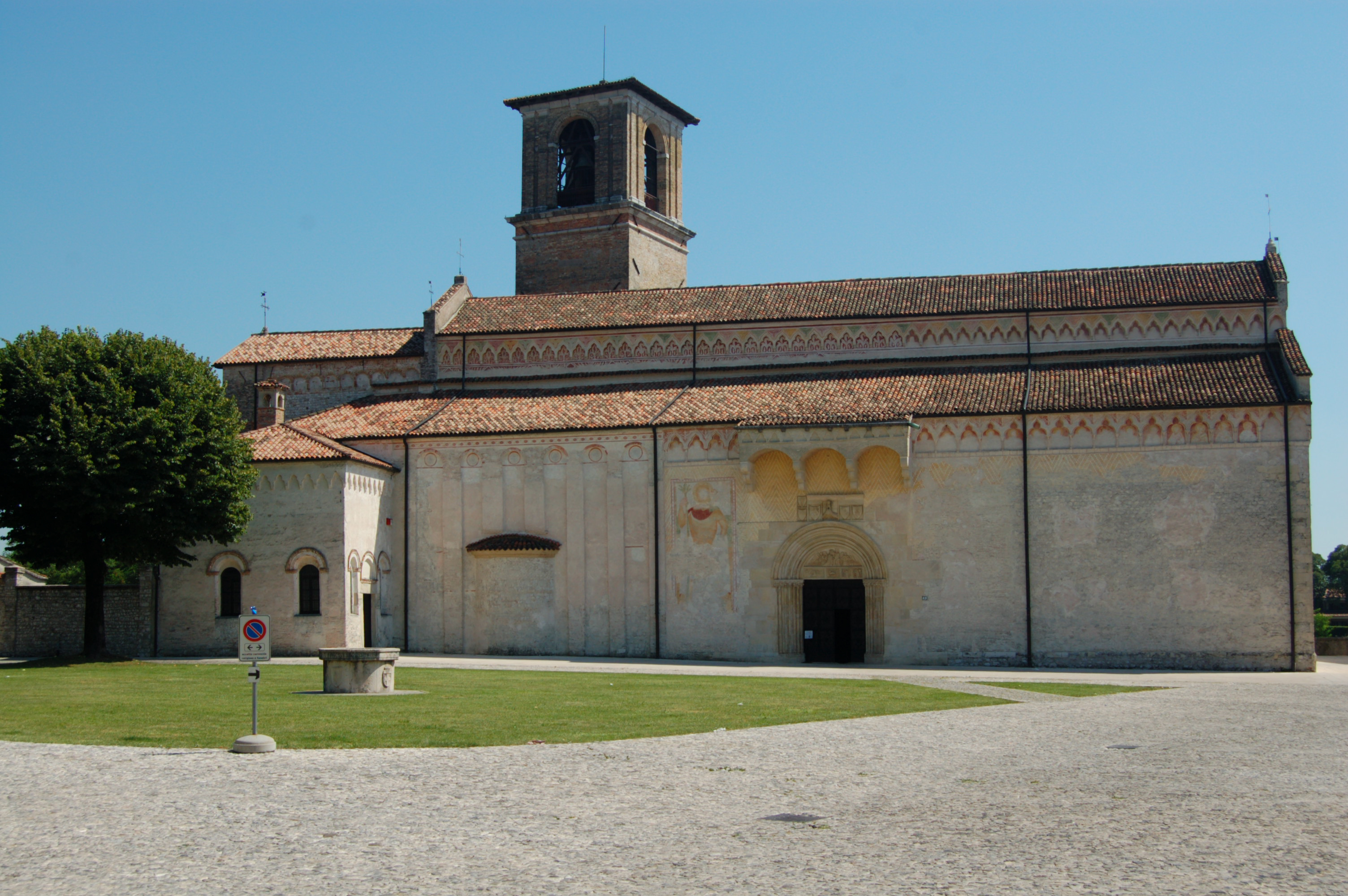
- Cathedral

- Coat of arms

- Location within Italy Location within Friuli-Venezia Giulia
- Coordinates: 46°07′41″N 12°53′06″E
- Country: Italy
- Region: Friuli-Venezia Giulia
- Province: Pordenone (PN)
- Frazioni: Barbeano, Baseglia, Gaio, Gradisca, Istrago, Tauriano, Vacile

Government
  - Mayor: Enrico Sarcinelli (centre-right)

Area
  - Total: 71.88 km^{2} (27.75 sq mi)
- Elevation: 132 m (433 ft)

Population (30 June 2025)
  - Total: 11,785
  - Density: 164.0/km^{2} (424.6/sq mi)
- Demonym: Spilimberghesi
- Time zone: UTC+1 (CET)
  - Summer (DST): UTC+2 (CEST)
- Postal code: 33097
- Dialing code: 0427
- Patron saint: St. Roch
- Saint day: August 16
- Website: Official website

Spilimbergo (German: Spengenberg; Friulian: Spilimberc or Spilinberc) is a comune (municipality) with a population of 11,785 in the Regional decentralization entity of Pordenone, in the Italian region of Friuli-Venezia Giulia. It is located on the right side of the Tagliamento river. The town is notable as the home of the Mosaic School of Friuli (Scuola Mosaicisti del Friuli), which was founded in 1922 and has students from all over the world.

Spilimbergo borders the following municipalities: Arba, Dignano, Flaibano, Pinzano al Tagliamento, San Daniele del Friuli, San Giorgio della Richinvelda, Sequals, Vivaro.

== History ==
Spilimbergo's history begins around the 11th century, when the Spengenberg counts arrived from Carinthia and settled down in the area, acting as the vassals of the bishop of Aquileia. The name of the town derives from the castrum de Spengenberg ("castle of the Spengenberg").

However, human settlement had already been present for a long time. In the frazione of Gradisca, various remains of a castelliere have been discovered, and they are speculated to date back to the Roman era. Here there existed a road that crossed the Tagliamento river and stretched from Sacile to Germany.

In the centuries following the settlement of the Spengenberg, Spilimbergo developed both as a military stronghold and as the centre of a commercial network. Thanks to the arrival of many "foreigners", such as Lombard, Tuscan, and Jewish people, there had been a considerable demographic and urban growth. Following the instructions by count Walterpertoldo II, in 1284 the construction of the Duomo Arcipretale di Santa Maria Maggiore began, which is considered one of the finest romanesque-gothic monuments from the Friuli-Venezia Giulia region. Other important buildings from the same period are il palazzo del Daziario (the palace of the Tolls), la casa del Capitano (the house of the Captain), and la Loggia (where the town hall is currently located). In 1326, thanks to the counts Bregonia and Bartolomeo, Spilimbergo's jurisdiction obtained its own legislative body, the Statute of the Land of Spilimbergo (Statuto della Terra di Spilimbergo).

In 1420 the town passed onto the Republic of Venice, following the same fate as the Patria del Friuli.

The War of the League of Cambrai struck the region particularly, turning it into the centre of the conflict between the pro-imperial (Strumieri) and the pro-venetian factions (Zamberlani).

Despite everything, Spilimbergo in the following years carried on with its period of economic prosperity, which had an impact on its cultural plane too. During this period the castle was rebuilt in the style of the Renaissance, and various works of art were created by renowned artists such as Giovanni Antonio Pilacorte, Il Pordenone, Pomponio Amalteo, Gasparo Narvesa, and Irene di Spilimbergo. In the literary field Gian Domenico Cancianini, Eusebio Stella, and Bernardino Partenio stood out, with the latter being the founder of an academy for the study of the Latin, Greek and Hebrew languages. The contribution by some active bourgeois families — like the Balzaro, the Monaco, the Stella, the Cisternini, the Fannio, and the Santorini — is also noteworthy.

== Main sights ==
- City walls and towers
- Cathedral (13th century)
- Castle, attested in 1120 but destroyed by a fire in 1511

== People ==
- Giovanni Battista Cavedalis (1794–1858), Italian patriot
- Irene di Spilimbergo (1538–1559), Italian Renaissance painter and poet
- Gabriele Saro, (1976), Italian producer of commercial music, composer, violinist, singer
- Matteo Spilimbergo
- Giovanni Battista Agneletti, (born before 1656)

== See also ==
- Spilimbergo (surname)
