= Gabriele Saro =

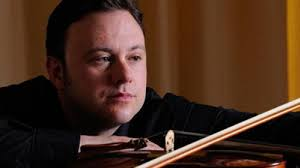
- Gabriele Saro in 2013

Background information
- Born: August 8, 1976 (age 49); Spilimbergo, Italy
- Genres: R&B, pop, rock, contemporary classical and choir
- Occupations: Producer, composer, violinist, singer
- Instruments: Violin, piano, organ
- Years active: 1987−present
- Website: www.gabrielesaro.com

Gabriele Saro (born August 8, 1976, in Spilimbergo, Italy) is an Italian producer of commercial music, composer, violinist, singer in choirs and teacher.

== Biography ==
Gabriele Saro was born in Spilimbergo, on August 8, 1976. He studied Business Administration at the University of Udine. Graduated in violin and master degree in composition for film music at the Conservatory in Udine.

He started his professional career as musician in 1987 in young orchestras. As a composer, he had his first music performance in 2009. A musician and composer, Saro collaborates as a violinist in various classical and popular music ensembles, and sings in some regional choral groups in Friuli-Venezia Giulia. He also plays the piano and the organ.

In 2017, he won silver medals at the Global Music Awards with his albums "Sunsets 2", "Passion" and "SensationS".

As a composer, he was awarded at domestic and international competitions, both for classical and pop music. He was a winner of the UK Songwriting Contest and TOP 10 in 2 editions at the USA Songwriting Competition. On 2022, As a Producer, he has been considered for a Grammy nomination.

== Award ==
Gabriele Saro is the winner of many awards. This is a list of some of those awards.

As classical/new age composer

- 2017: Global Music Awards – 2 Silver Medals
- 2019: Global Music Awards – Silver Medal
- 2019 ZMR Awards: Qualifier as Best Album of The Year
- 2019 ZMR Awards: Qualifier as Best Piano Album with Instrumentation

As composer of electronic music

- 2021: Global Music Awards – Bronze Medal

As songwriter

- 2011: UK Songwriting Contest – semi-finalist
- 2013: UK Songwriting Contest – Semi-finalist
- 2015: USA Songwriting Competition – Finals
- 2015: UK Songwriting Contest – 1. Prize
- 2017: USA Songwriting Competition – TOP 10
- 2021: Grammy 2022 Nomination Candidate as Producer
- 2023: World Entertainment Award – Nomination

As video clip

- 2018: Sanremo Videoclip Awards – 1. Prize

As orchestral music

- 2020: Global Music Awards – Bronze Medal
- 2022: 2nd Swiss International Music Competition – 1. Prize
- 2023: 5th Swiss International Music Competition – 1. Prize
- 2024: 11th Swiss International Music Competition – 1. Prize
- 2025: 12th Swiss International Music Competition – 1. Prize
- 2026: 13th Swiss International Music Competition – 1. Prize
