= Zanette =

Zanette is a surname. Notable people with the surname include:

- Denis Zanette (1970-2003), Italian cyclist
- Paul Zanette (born 1988), Canadian-Italian ice hockey player

== See also ==
- Zanetti, a surname
