= Giuseppe Miti Zanetti =

Italian painter (1859–1929)

Giuseppe Miti Zanetti (9 October 1859 in Modena – 1929 in Milan) was an Italian painter and engraver, mainly of melancholic vedute of Venice.

Son of a well-to-do lawyer, he orphaned of father at a young age. Gravitating to arts, he first studied in the Academy of Fine Arts of Modena, but by 1874 he had enrolled in the Academy in Bologna, where his mother had been born to a noble family. From there he moved to Venice in 1884, where he developed his predilection for views of Venetian buildings and their reflections, influenced by Mario de Maria. He traveled to Milan, and exhibited at Paris in 1899 and Munich in 1902. He participated every year in the International Exposition in Venice from 1895 to 1924. In later years, he taught at the Academies of Modena and Venice. After the move to Milan, he began to paint alpine landscapes in a style recalling Antonio Fontanesi. Among his works are La malaria, Venezia, Galleria d'arte moderna in Venice; Pesca in laguna, Galleria d'arte moderna in Milan.
