= International justice =

International justice may refer to:

- Global justice
- International Justice Mission
- International law
