= Irene di Spilimbergo =

Italian painter (1538–1559)

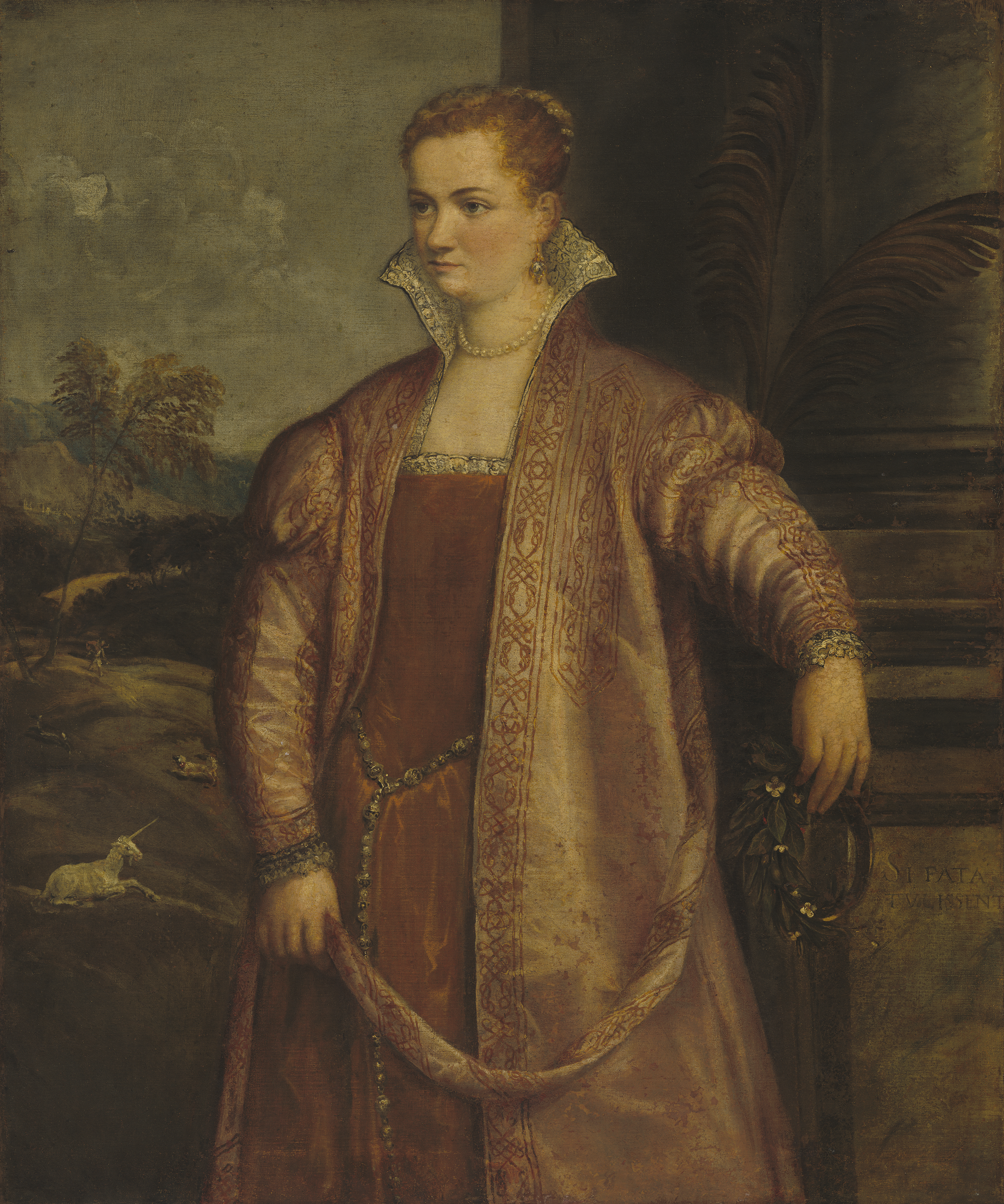
- Painting by Gian Paolo Pace, a follower of Titian, c. 1560
- Born: 17 October 1538; Spilimbergo, Republic of Venice
- Died: 17 December 1559 (aged 21); Venice, Republic of Venice

Irene di Spilimbergo (17 October 1538 - 17 December 1559) was an Italian Renaissance painter and poet.

== Biography ==
She is mostly known for an effusive volume of poetic elegies published two years after her death by Dionigi Atanagi and containing 279 Italian and 102 Latin poems, some anonymous, and others either penned or attributed to contemporary cultural figures including Lodovico Dolce, Torquato Tasso, Titian, Girolamo Muzio, Luigi Tanzillo, Giuseppe Bettusi, and Benedetto Varchi.

Born in Spilimbergo (in the province of Pordenone), a small town about thirty kilometers northwest of Udine, by report she demonstrated her artistic abilities at a young age. She is compared sometimes with another woman painter, Sofonisba Anguissola (born in Cremona and of greater longevity (1532–1625). Irene studied under Titian for two years. Few if any of her works are known. Her true nature and skills are difficult to sift from the poetic legend; she was for her eulogists the equivalent of the prototypical ever-innocent feminine charm, what Beatrice was to Dante and Laura to Petrarch, although girded with a paint-brush for the craft-oriented Renaissance.

The National Gallery of Art (Washington, D.C.) houses two paintings in relation to her: a portrait of her sister Emilia di Spilimbergo, with a landscape background, has been attributed to Gian Paolo Pace, a follower of Titian, and a pendant portrait of Irene di Spilimbergo is thought to be by Gian Paolo Pace and Titian.

She died in Venice at the age of 21.
