= Michela Zanetti =

Italian footballer

Personal information
- Full name: Michela Zanetti
- Date of birth: 25 April 1991 (age 35)
- Place of birth: Udine, Italy
- Position: Striker

Senior career*
Years	Team	Apps	(Gls)
2008–2014	Chiasiellis	118	(22)
2014–2015	Bearzi	24	(10)
2015–2018	Pordenone		
- * Club domestic league appearances and goals

Michela Zanetti (born 25 April 1991) is an Italian football forward, who most recently played for Pordenone in Serie B.
