= Daniele Manin =

Italian politician (1804–1857)

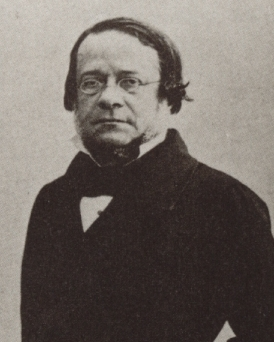

President of the Republic of San Marco
- In office 17 March 1848 – 22 August 1849
- Preceded by: Office created; Ferdinando I as king of Lombardy–Venetia; Ludovico Manin as last doge of Venice
- Succeeded by: Office abolished; Francesco Giuseppe I as king of Lombardy–Venetia

Personal details
- Born: 13 May 1804 Venice, Italian Republic
- Died: 22 September 1857 (aged 53) Paris, Second French Empire
- Party: Independent
- Spouse: Teresa Perissinotti (1824–1849; her death)
- Children: Giorgio (1831–1882)
- Education: University of Padua
- Profession: Teacher; Lawyer

Daniele Manin (13 May 1804 – 22 September 1857) was an Italian patriot, statesman and leader of the Risorgimento in Venice.

== Early and family life ==
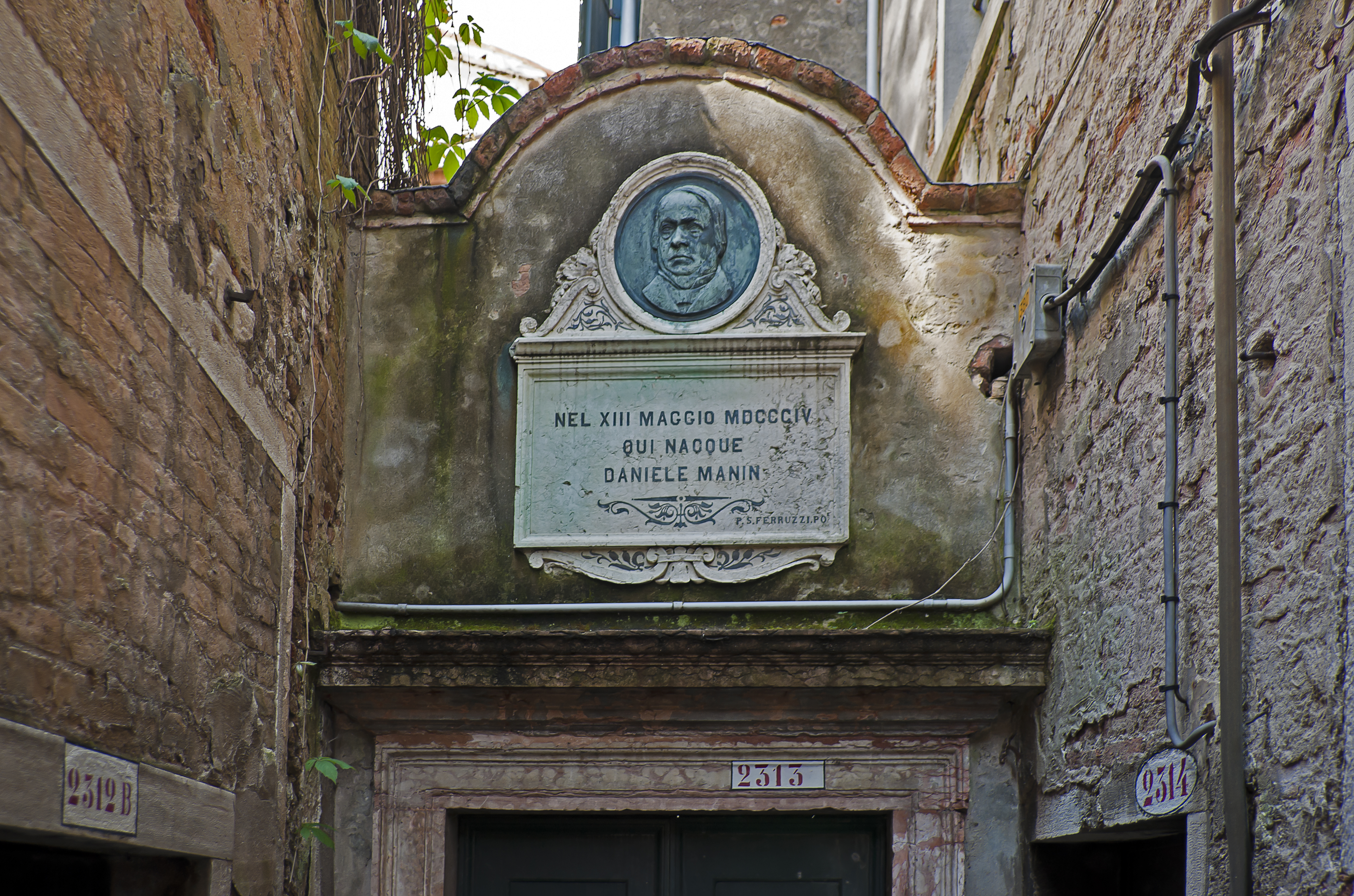
Birthplace of Daniele Manin, Ramo Astori, in Venice

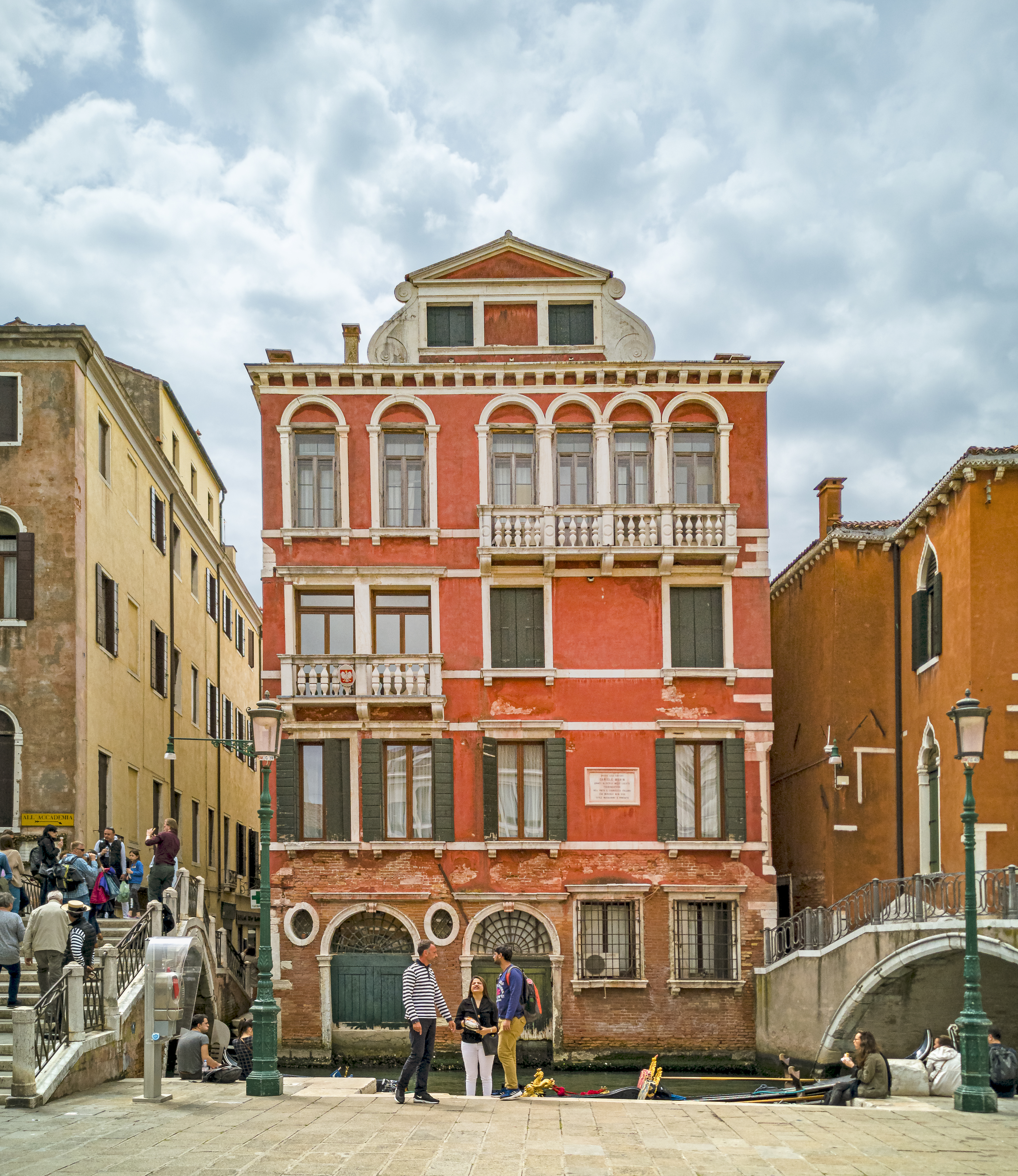
House in Venice where Daniele Manin lived

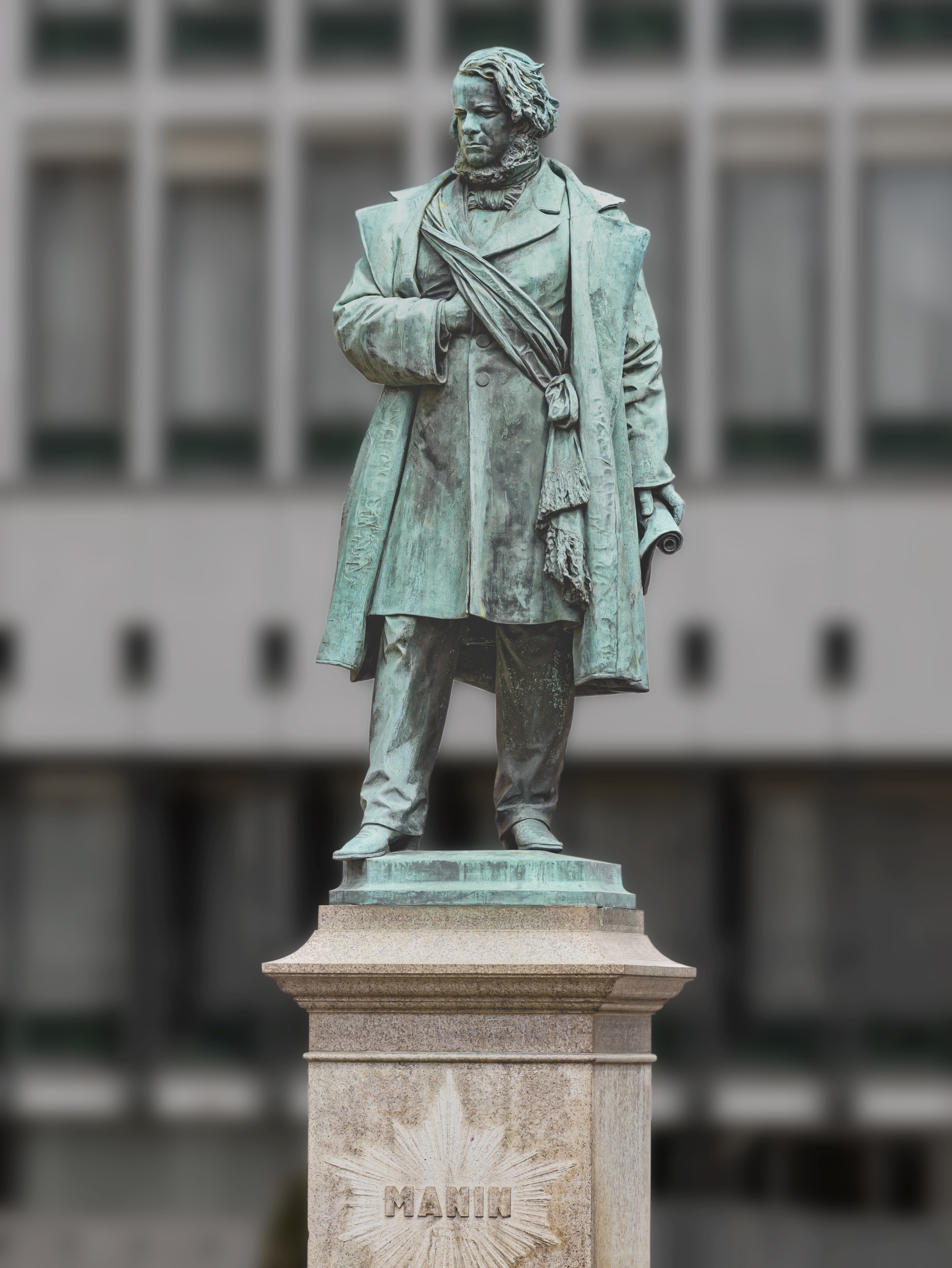
Manin from the 1875 monument by Luigi Borro, in Venice

Daniele Manin was born Daniele Fonseca in Ramo Astori, Venice, where his birthplace is commemorated by a plaque.

His mother, Anna Maria Bellotto, came from Padua, while his father, Pietro Antonio Fonseca (1762–1829), came from a family that was originally from Verona. Daniele's Veronese grandfather, Samuele Medina, was Jewish, but he converted to Christianity in 1759 and took the name Manin because Ludovico Manin, the last Doge of Venice, sponsored his conversion. Daniele Manin's niece was the painter and printmaker Leopoldina Zanetti Borzino.

Manin studied law in the University of Padua.

From an early age, he hated Austria, which at the time ruled Venice.

== Revolutionary leader ==
The failed attempt of the Bandiera Brothers, Venetians who had served in the Austrian navy, against the Neapolitan Bourbons in 1844, ignited the Venetian patriotism. In 1847, Manin presented a petition to the Venetian congregation, a consultative assembly tolerated by Austria, informing the emperor of the wants of the nation. He was arrested on a charge of high treason on 18 January 1848, although his arrest only served to agitate the Venetians.

Two months later, the people of Venice forced Count Pallfy, the Austrian governor, to release Manin (17 March). The Austrians soon lost control of the city: the Venetian Arsenal was seized by revolutionaries, and, under the direction of Manin, a civic guard and a provisional government were instituted. The Austrians withdrew from Venice on 26 March, and Manin became president of the Republic of San Marco. He was in favour of Italian unity and was not anxious about annexation to Piedmont because he would have liked to enlist French aid. He then resigned his powers to the Piedmontese commissioners on 7 August. But after the Piedmontese defeat at Custoza, and the armistice in which King Charles Albert abandoned Lombardy and Venetia to Austria, the Venetians attempted to lynch the royal commissioners, whose lives Manin saved. An assembly was summoned, and a triumvirate formed with Manin at its head.

Towards the end of 1848, the Austrians reoccupied all of the Venetian mainland. Early in 1849, Manin was again chosen president of the Republic, and conducted the defence of the city, with the citizens fighting back the reoccupation.

After the defeat of Charles Albert's troops at Novara in March, the Venetian assembly voted to grant Manin powers.

Meanwhile, the Austrian forces closed around the city. Manin was seconded by the Neapolitan general, Guglielmo Pepe, who led the Neapolitan army to defend Venice against his king's order. On 26 May, the Venetians were forced to abandon Fort Marghera; food was becoming scarce; on 19 June, the powder magazine blew up; and in July, cholera broke out. The Austrian batteries, subsequently, began to bombard Venice, and when the Sardinian fleet withdrew from the Adriatic, the city was also attacked by sea.

On 24 August 1849, Manin succeeded in negotiating amnesty to save himself, Pepe and some others who were to go into exile. On 27 August, Manin left Venice on board a French ship.

== Exile and last years ==
His wife died in Marseille, and he himself reached Paris. In Paris, he became a leader among the Italian exiles. There, he became a convert from republicanism to monarchism, being convinced that only under the auspices of King Victor Emmanuel could Italy be freed, and together with Giorgio Pallavicini and Giuseppe La Farina, he founded the Società Nazionale Italiana, with the object of propagating the idea of unity under the Piedmontese monarchy.

His daughter died in 1854 from her illness. Manin died on 22 September 1857 and was buried in Ary Scheffer's family tomb.

In 1868, two years after the Austrians finally departed from Venice, his remains were brought to his native city and honoured with a public funeral. The gondola carrying his coffin was decorated with a bow "surmounted by the lion of Saint Mark, resplendent with gold", bore "the Venetian standard veiled with black crape", and had "two silver colossal statues waving the national colours of Italy". The statues represented the unification of Italy and Venice. His remains are interred in a sarcophagus, which is located in the Piazzetta dei Leoncini, on the north side of the Basilica San Marco.

== Evaluation ==
According to the Encyclopædia Britannica Eleventh Edition,

Manin was a man of the greatest honesty, and possessed genuinely statesmanlike qualities. He believed in Italian unity when most men, even Cavour, regarded it as a vain thing. For example, during the 1856 Congress of Paris, Manin met with Cavour to discuss the unification of Italy. After the meeting, Cavour wrote that Manin had talked about "l'unità d'Italia ed altre corbellerie" ("the unity of Italy and other nonsense"). Manin's work of propaganda by means of the Italian National Society greatly contributed to the success of the cause.

== Sources ==
- This article incorporates text from a publication now in the public domain: Chisholm, Hugh, ed. (1911). "Manin, Daniele". Encyclopædia Britannica. Vol. 17 (11th ed.). Cambridge University Press. p. 581. This cites:
  - A. Errera, Vita di D. Manin (Venice, 1872)
  - P. de la Farge, Documents, &c., de D. Manin (Paris, 1860)
  - Henri Martin, D. Manin (Paris, 1859)
  - V. Marchesi, Settant' anni della storia di Venezia (Turin)
  - A monograph in Countess Martinengo Cesaresco's Italian Characters (London, 1901)
- Keates, Jonathan (2005). The Siege of Venice. Chatto & Windus. ISBN 9780701166373.
- Cook's handbook to Venice. Cook Thomas and son, ltd. 1874.
