= Leopoldina Zanetti Borzino =

Italian painter (1826–1902)

- Born: Leopoldina Zanetti; 1826; Venice, Italy
- Died: 1902 (aged 75–76); Milan, Italy
- Known for: Painting

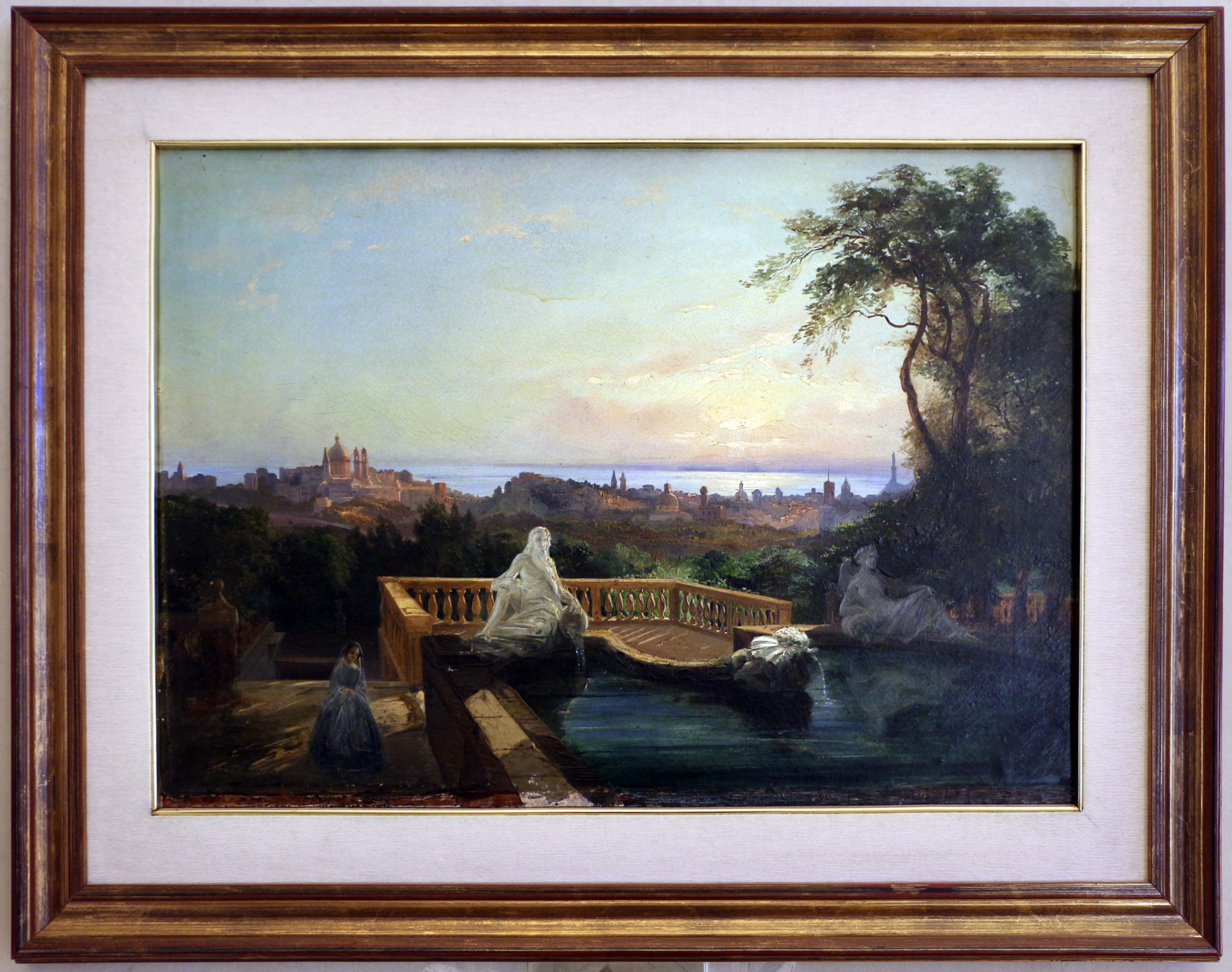
View of Genoa from the Villa delle Peschiere, 1858

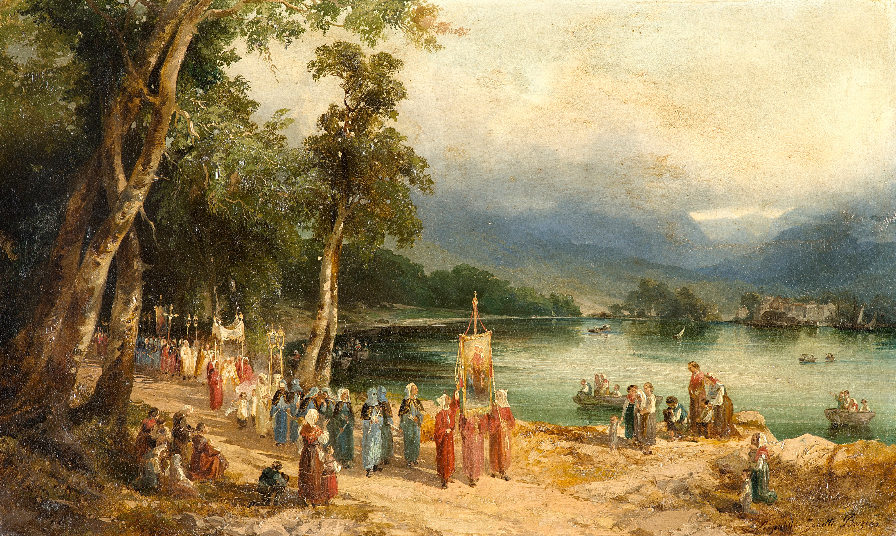
Processione

Leopoldina Zanetti Borzino (1826–1902) was an Italian painter and printmaker.

== Biography ==
Born Leopoldina Zanetti in Venice, Zanetti Borzino was the niece of Daniele Manin. She later moved to Genoa, where she married the painter Ulisse Borzino. She studied in Milan, and participated in numerous exhibitions there and in Genoa. She died in Milan.

Zanetti Borzino is represented in the collection of the National Gallery of Art with a lithograph. Other work is in the Gallery of Modern Art (GAM), Villa Saluzzo Serra, Nervi, Genoa.
