= Lion of Saint Mark =

Symbol of Mark the Evangelist

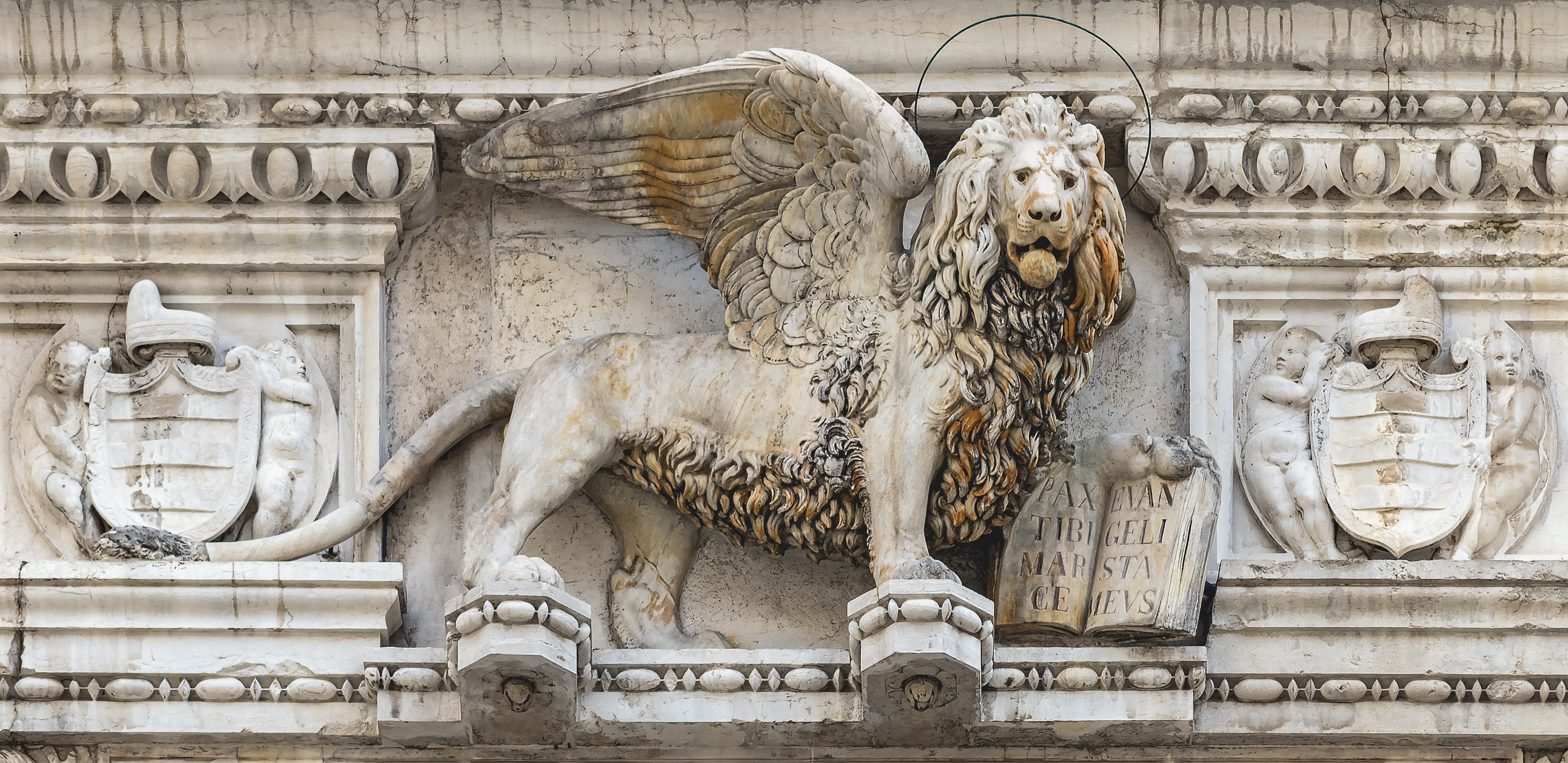
The winged lion of St Mark at the Doge's Palace, Venice. The open book holds the legend PAX TIBI MARCE EVANGELISTA MEVS (lit. 'Peace unto you, Mark, my Evangelist')

The Lion of Saint Mark, representing Mark the Evangelist, pictured in the form of a winged lion, is an aspect of the Tetramorph. On the pinnacle of St Mark's Cathedral he is depicted as holding a Bible, and surmounting a golden lion which is the symbol of the city of Venice and formerly of the Venetian Republic.

It is also found in the symbol of the Greek Orthodox Patriarchate of Alexandria. It appears in both merchant and military naval flags of the Italian Republic. The Lion of Saint Mark is also the symbol of the award of the Venice Film Festival, the "Golden Lion", and of the insurance company Assicurazioni Generali.

== Symbolism ==
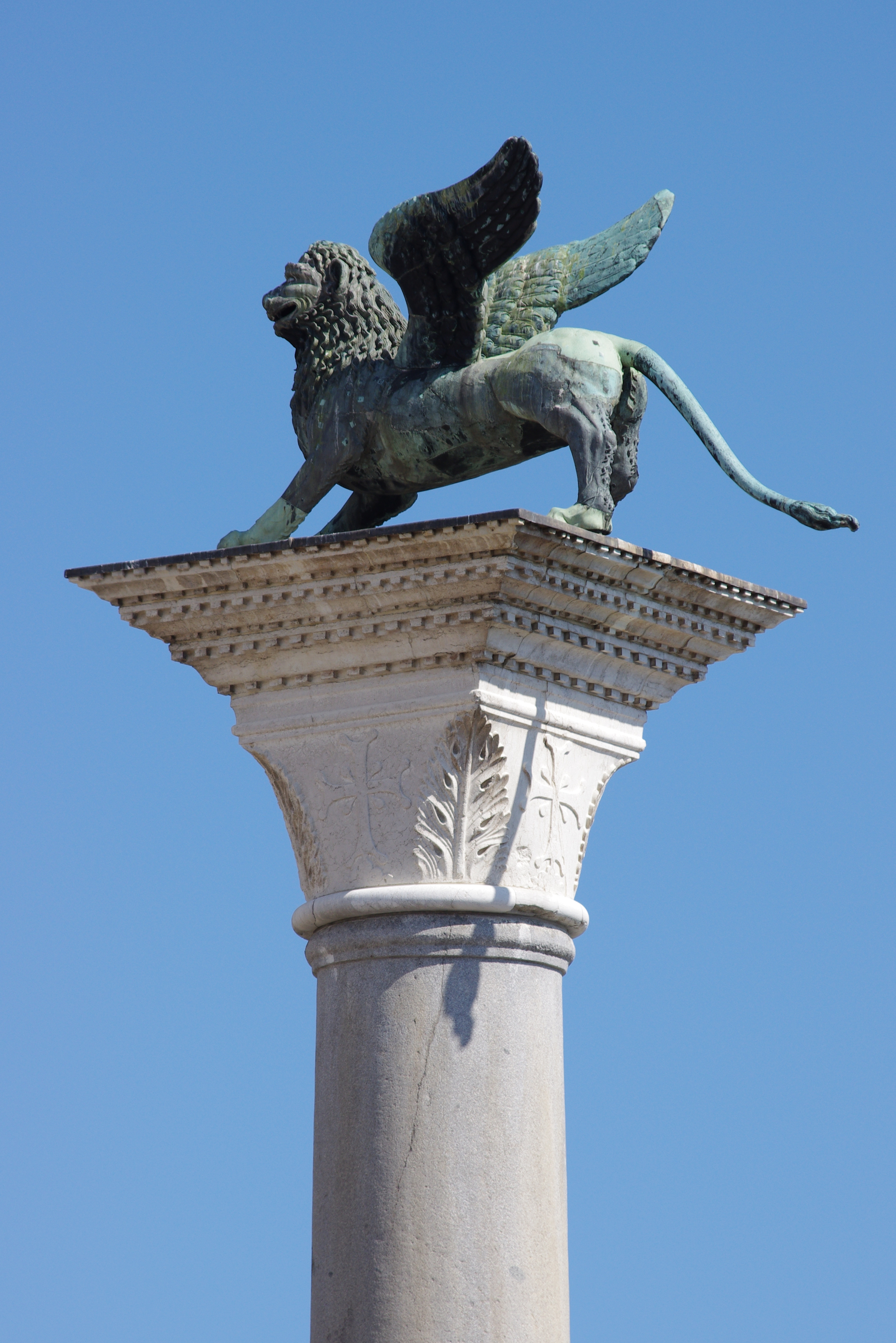
Lion of Venice, Piazza San Marco (Venice)

The representation as a lion is derived from Mark's description of John the Baptist as "...The voice of the one who cries in the wilderness: Prepare Ye the way of the Lord, make straight his paths", which artists compared to a roaring lion. The wings come from Ezekiel 1:10 and the application of the prophet's vision of four winged creatures to the evangelists. These appear again in Revelation 4:7.

A second connection of Mark and lions comes from a tale recounted by Severus ibn al-Muqaffa: "Once a lion and lioness appeared to John Mark and his father Apostalis while they were traveling in Jordan. The father was very scared and begged his son to escape, while he awaited his fate. John Mark assured his father that Jesus Christ would save them and began to pray. The two beasts fell dead and as a result of this miracle, the father believed in Christ."

In some depictions the lion rests his front paws on the ground, often in cities with rivers or in ones close to water, indicating the Venetian balanced power on land and sea.

== Mark and Venice ==
Venetian tradition states that when Mark was traveling through Europe, he arrived at a lagoon in Venice, whereby an angel appeared to him and said, "Pax tibi Marce, evangelista meus. Hic requiescet corpus tuum." ("Peace be with thee, O Mark, my evangelist. Here thy body will rest."). This tradition was used as justification by Rustico da Torcello and Bon da Malamocco in 828 for stealing the remains of Mark from his grave in Alexandria, and moving them to Venice, where they were eventually interred in the Basilica of St. Mark.

A fifteen-foot bronze statue of a lion stands atop a column of Egyptian granite in St. Mark's Square. It was brought to the lagoon during the 12th century, and remained there until Napoleon moved it to Paris. Returned in 1815, it fell and was rebuilt. It was moved from its pedestal only at the end of the 1800s for restoration and during the Second World War for safekeeping. The Lion underwent careful restoration work in the 1990s. Restorers believe its body is roughly 2,300 years old.

There are also lions carved in relief on the façade of the Doge's Palace, and at the Scuola Grande di San Marco A common theme in venetian art, it was also present in armoury worn by noblemen.

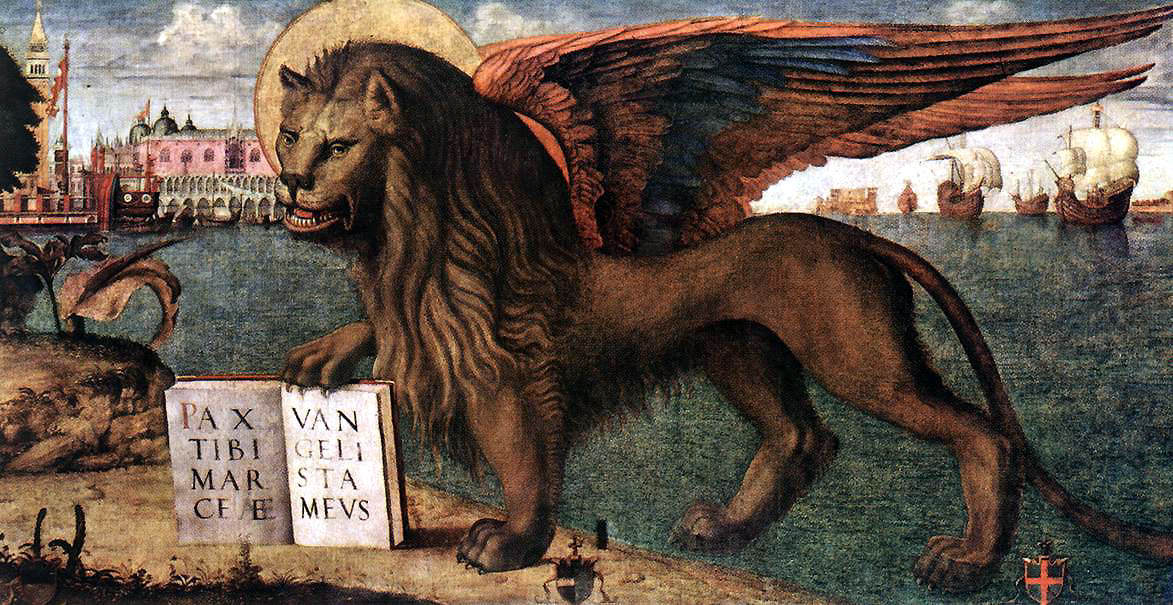
1516 canvas in the Doge's Palace, by Vittore Carpaccio

The coats of arms of Popes Pius X, John XXIII, and John Paul I contain the Lion of St. Mark in recognition of their previous positions as Patriarchs of Venice.

It is also visible in several places in the Giuliano-Dalmata area of Rome (including the church of San Marco Evangelista in Agro Laurentino), which was settled by refugees from the Julian March (formerly Venetian territory) after the Second World War.

The name of the Lion of Saint Mark in the Venetian language is Leòn de San Marco.

== Depictions ==
The Venetian lion appears in two distinct forms. One is as a winged animal resting on water, to symbolise dominance over the seas, holding St. Mark's Gospel under a paw. These animals can be seen all around the Mediterranean, usually on top of a classical stone column. The other form is known as the lion "in moleca", in the form of a crab. Here the lion is depicted full-faced with its wings circled around the head and resembling the claws of a crustacean. It is emerging from water, so that the lion "in moleca" is associated with the lagoon and the city, whereas the standing winged lion is thought to be more associated with Venetian territory around the Mediterranean.

The Latin words engraved on the book are Pax Tibi Marce Evangelista Meus, which means Peace unto you, Mark, my Evangelist.

Other elements often included in depictions of the lion include a halo over his head, a book, or a sword in its paws.

In British heraldry, "Lion of St. Mark" is commonly used to refer to all winged lions. These figures are depicted in arms as both passant and, more commonly, sejant, and also appear as supporters. The heraldist Arthur Charles Fox-Davies, however, defined the true Lion of St. Mark as being one used specifically within religious badges to signify the saint, and to have a halo.

== Gallery ==
Flag of the Republic of Venice (mid-14th century)

Flag of the Republic of Venice

Flag of the Veneto Region

Arms of Venice

Jack of the Italian Navy

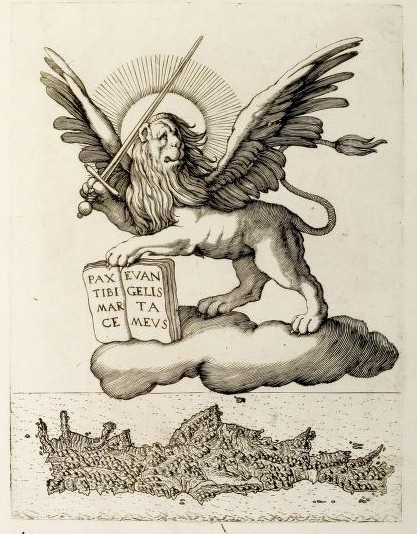
1651 map depicting the Lion of St Mark over Crete

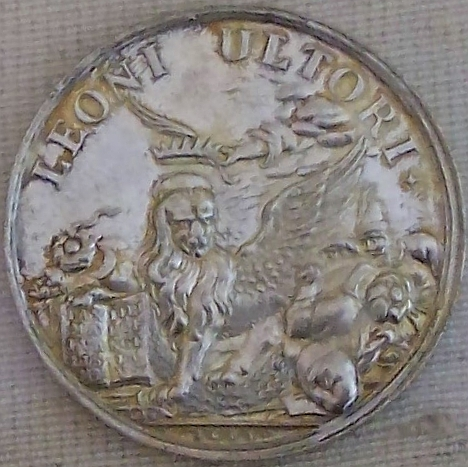
Medal for the conquest of the Morea by Francesco Morosini

Flag of the Republic of San Marco (1848)

Arms of Oberickelsheim

Coat of Arms of Pope John Paul I

Coat of Arms of the Republic of Venice

Lion of St. Mark seen on the Venetian Coat of Arms

Lion of St. Mark seen on the coat of arms of Montenegro

Arms of Marxzell

Arms of Saint-Marc-Jaumegarde

Flag of the Septinsular Republic

Flag of the United States of the Ionian Islands

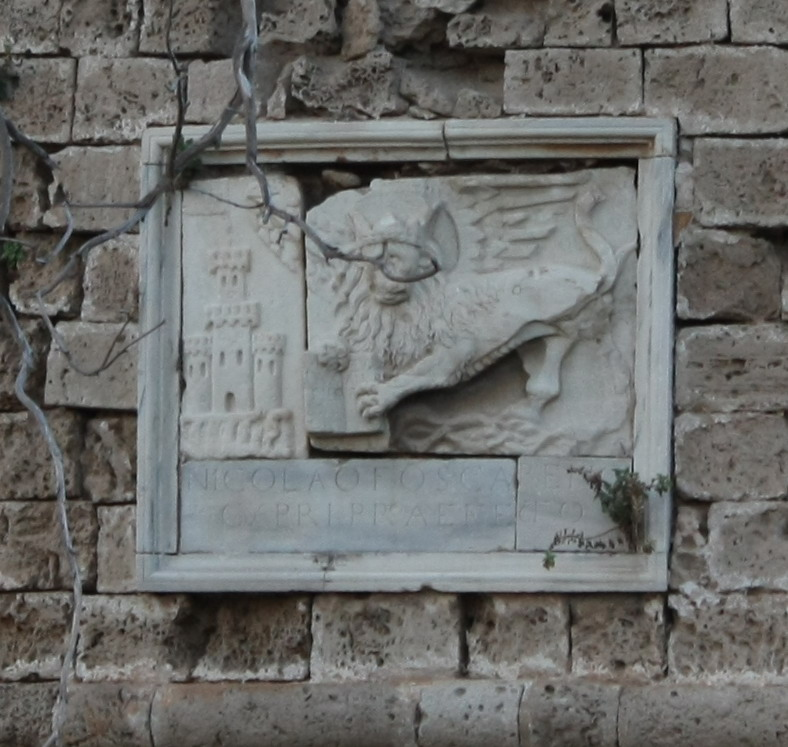
Lion of St. Mark in Othello Castle in Famagusta, Cyprus

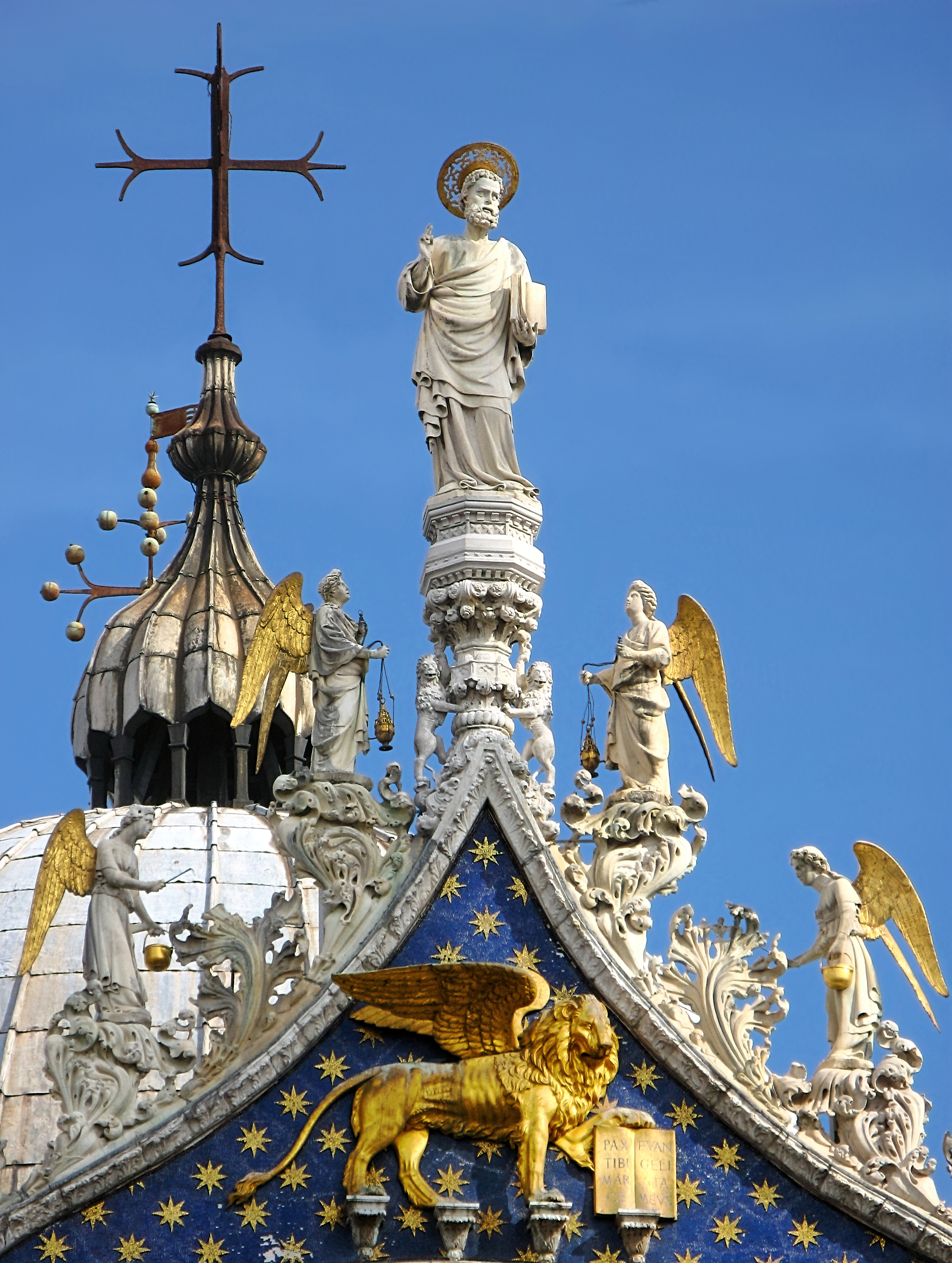
Detail of the rooftop of St Mark's Cathedral in Venice.

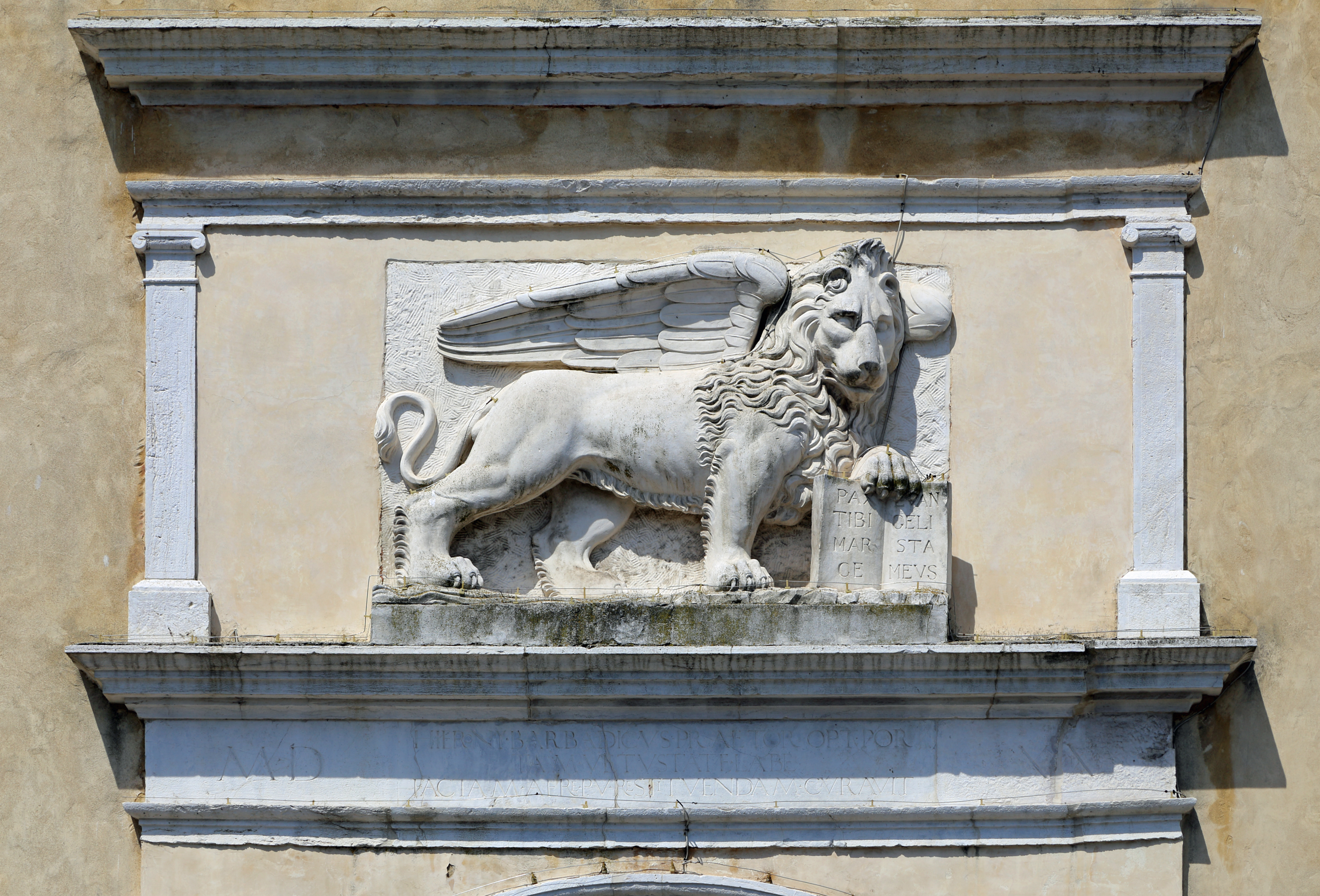
Lion of Saint Mark on the Porta di Santa Maria in Chioggia

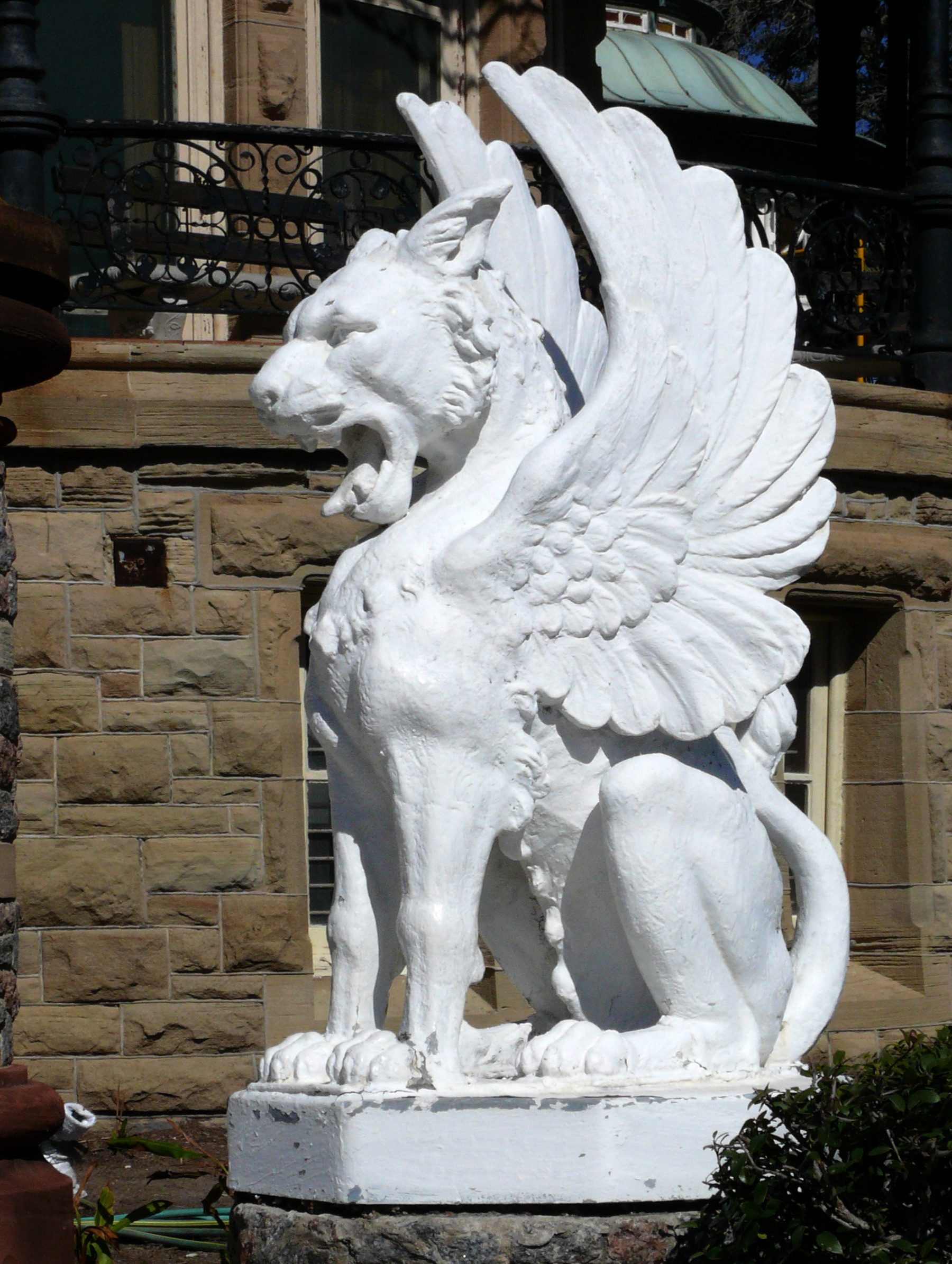
Lion of St Mark outside Bishop's Palace -- Galveston, Texas

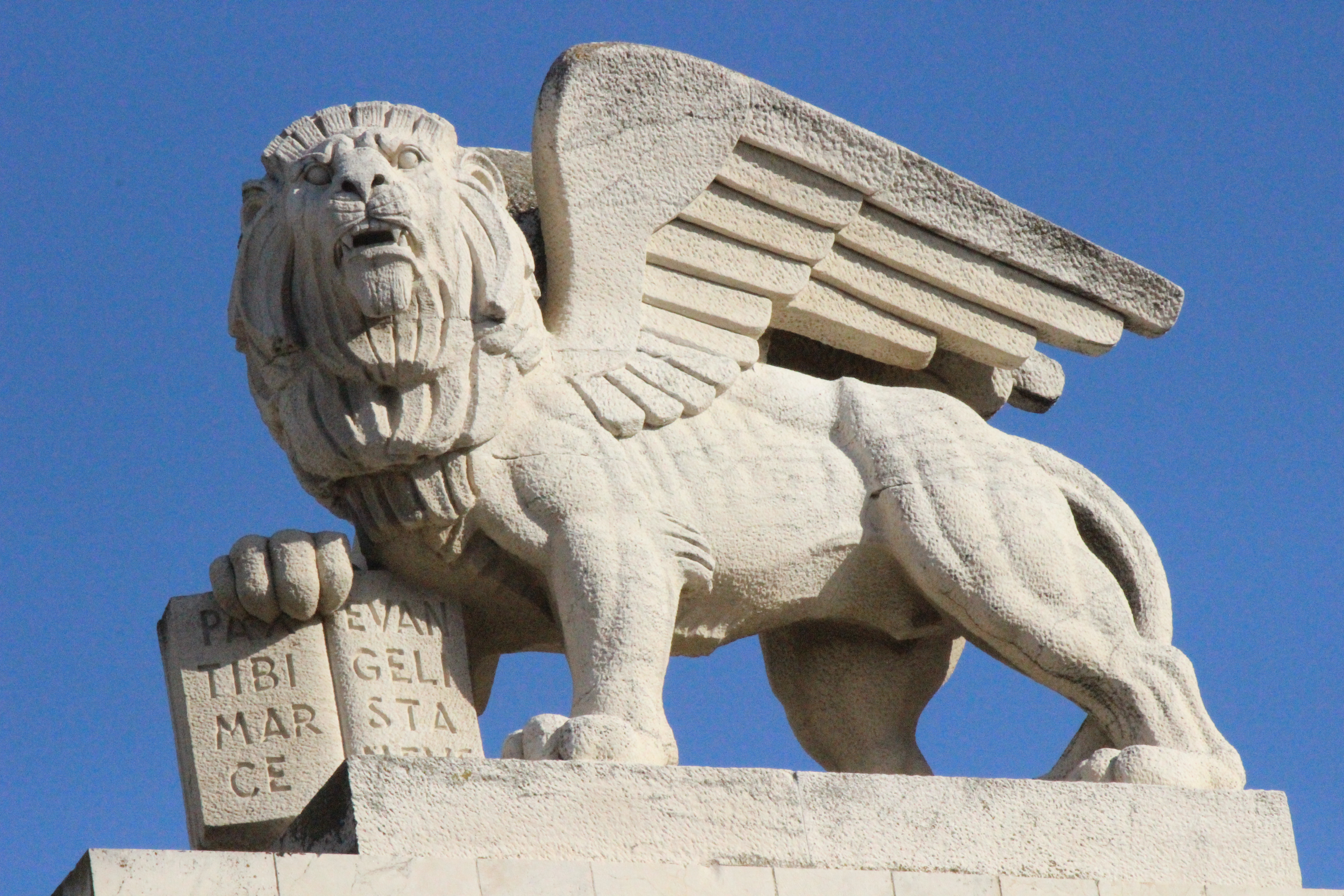
Lion of St. Mark with plaque atop the Generali Building in Jerusalem

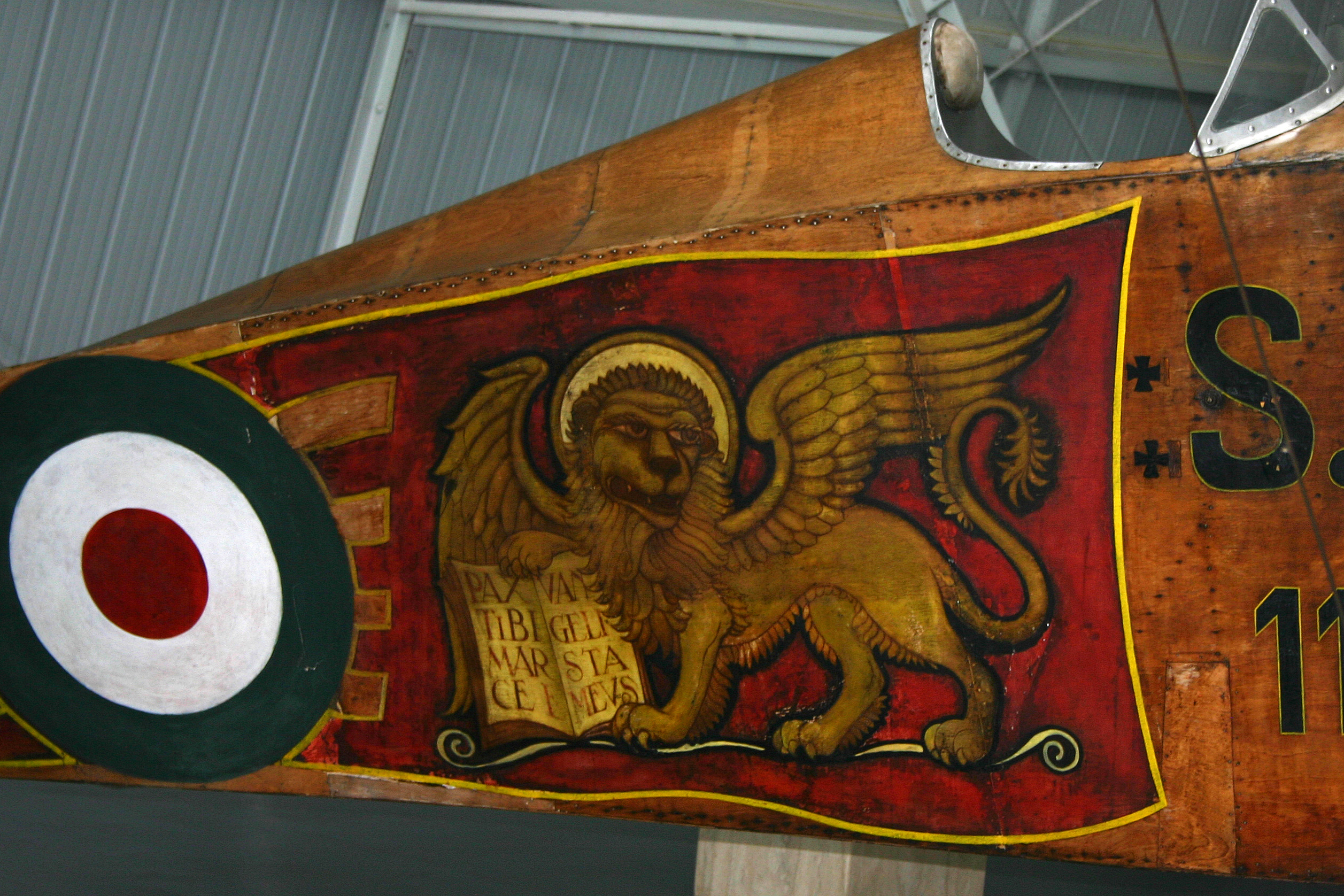
Lion of St. Mark from the Ansaldo SVA aircraft of the 87ma squadriglia La Serenissima, made famous for the Flight over Vienna.

United States Army Africa Insignia in Caserma Ederle

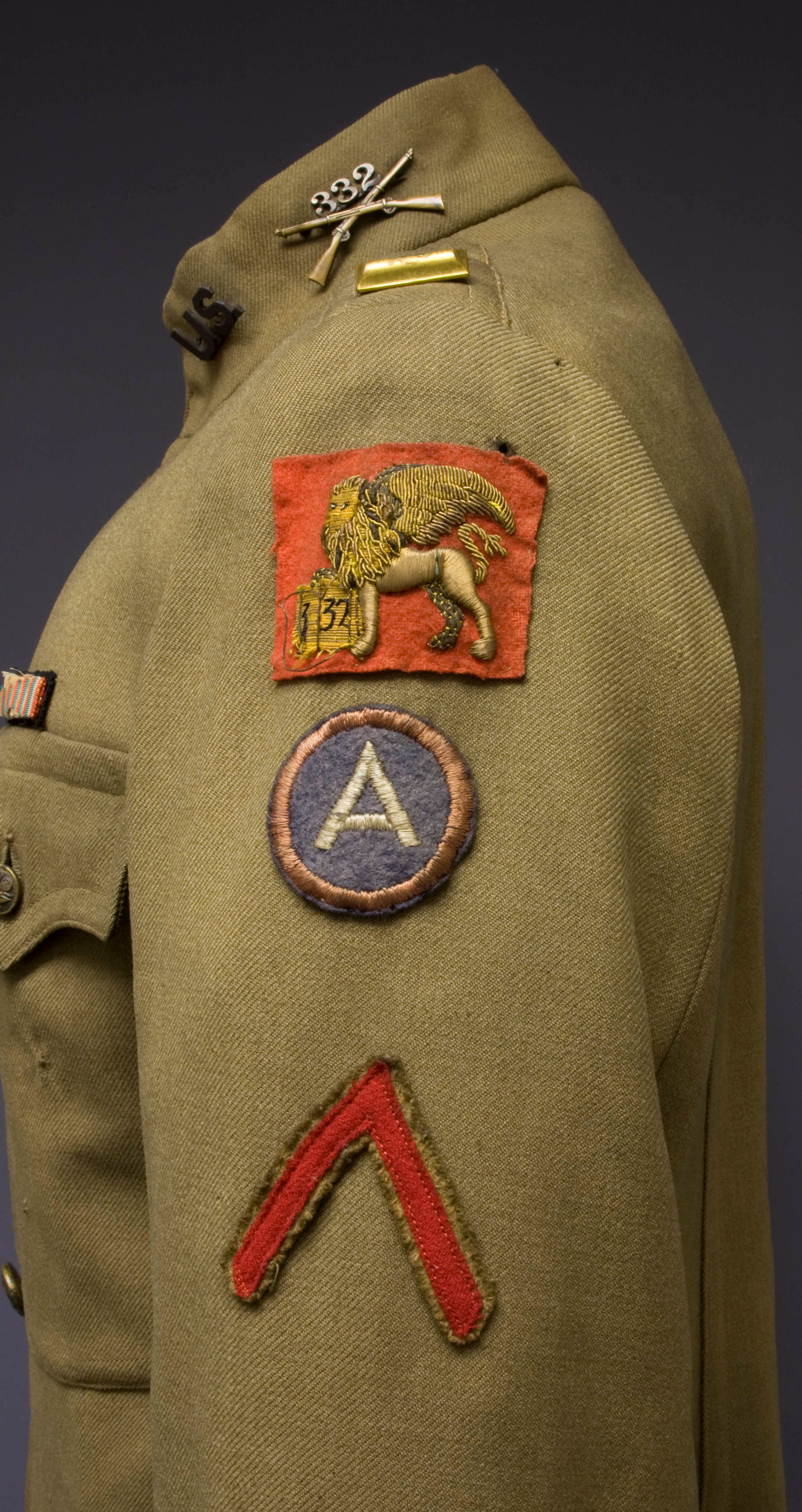
Sleeve insignia of the US 332nd Infantry Regiment (United States), which served alongside Italian troops in WW1

Seal of Yerevan

Tajikistan (1992–1993)

Emblem of Samarkand (Uzbekistan)

Sledge flag used by Albert Hastings Markham during the British Arctic Expedition (1875–1876)

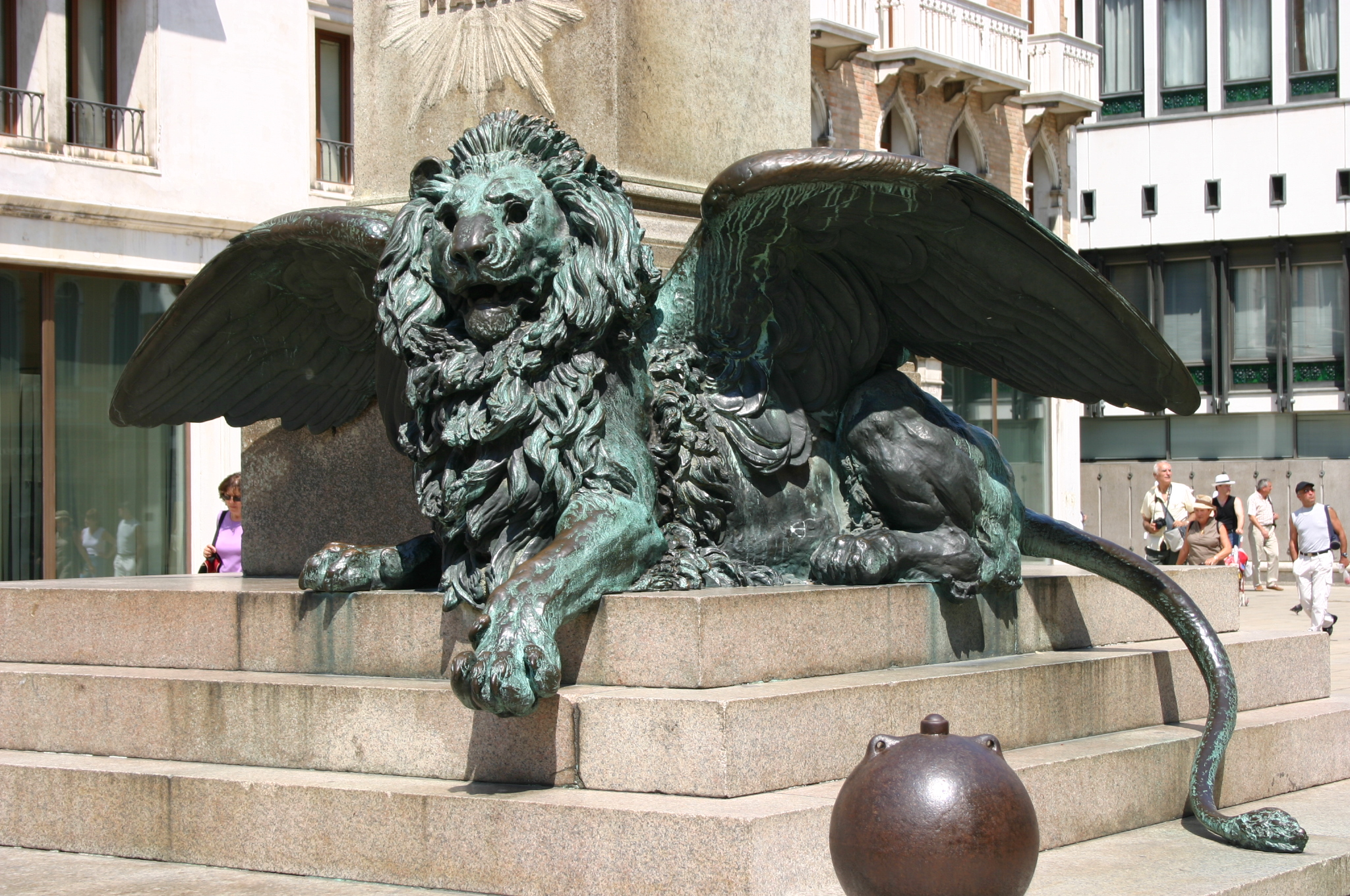
At the feet of Daniele Manin's statue at the campo Manin

== See also ==
- Lion and Sun
- Winged lion
- Eagle of Saint John
