= Republic of San Marco =

1848–1849 Italian revolutionary state

Coordinates: 45°26′N 12°19′E

Republic of San Marco Repubblica di San Marco (Italian) Repùblega Vèneta (Venetian)
- 1848–1849
- Flag Coat of arms
- Motto: Viva San Marco! (Italian) "Long Live St Mark!"
- Anthem: Inno Nasionale Veneto
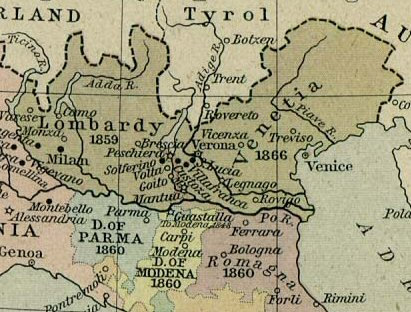
- The Austrian Kingdom of Lombardy–Venetia. The Republic of San Marco was situated in Venetia.
- Capital: Venice
- Common languages: Venetian, Italian
- Religion: Roman Catholicism
- Government: Republic
- President
- Historical era: Revolutions of 1848
  - Napoleon cedes Venice to Habsburg Austria: 17 October 1797
  - Insurrection against Habsburg rule: 17 March 1848
  - Independence declared: 22 March 1848
  - Joined by cities of Venetia: March – April 1848
  - Joined Piedmont-Sardinia: 5–13 August 1848
  - Battle of Novara: 23 March 1849
  - Manin negotiates surrender to Austria: 27 August 1849
  - Austria cedes Venetia to Italy (via France): 12 October 1866
- Currency: Venetian lira
Preceded by	Succeeded by
Kingdom of Lombardy–Venetia; Austrian Empire	Kingdom of Lombardy–Venetia; Austrian Empire
- See also: Republic of Venice (697–1797)

The Republic of San Marco (Italian: Repubblica di San Marco) or the Venetian Republic (Venetian: Repùblega Vèneta) was an Italian revolutionary state which existed for 17 months in 1848–1849. Based on the Venetian Lagoon, it extended into most of Venetia, or the Terraferma territory of the former Republic of Venice, suppressed 51 years earlier in the French Revolutionary Wars. After declaring independence from the Habsburg Austrian Empire, the republic later joined the Kingdom of Sardinia in an attempt, led by the latter, to unite northern Italy against foreign (mainly Austrian but also French) domination. The subsequent First Italian War of Independence ended in the defeat of Sardinia, and Austrian forces reconquered the Republic of San Marco on 28 August 1849 following a long siege.

== History ==
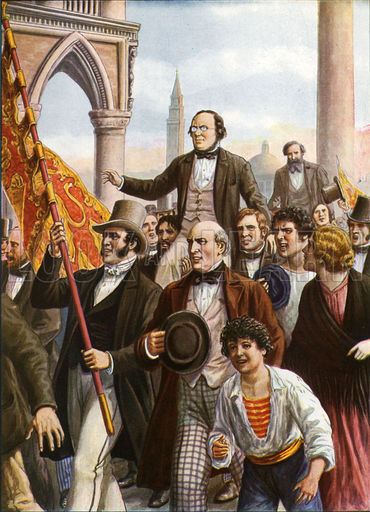
Daniele Manin and Niccolo Tommaseo are freed from prison, 18 March 1848.

=== Background ===
After existing as an independent maritime republic for 1,101 years and a leading naval power in the Mediterranean for most of that time, the Republic of Venice surrendered to Napoleon in 1797 and was ceded to the Habsburgs (as the Venetian Province) by the Treaty of Campo Formio a few months later. This was confirmed by the 1815 Congress of Vienna, whereby Venice became part of the Kingdom of Lombardy–Venetia within the Austrian Empire.

Austrian rule, after realising that mutually-agreeable home rule would not be possible, exploited Venetian resources, economically and politically, favouring Trieste as the imperial seaport. Within 50 years of their acquisition of the former republic, Austria had taken 45 million Austrian lire more from the region than had been spent there and Venetian capitalism had been stifled by a reluctance on the part of the slow, bureaucratic Habsburg régime to grant credit to Venetian entrepreneurs. By the end of the 1840s, a collection of intellectuals, urban manufacturers, bankers, merchants and agrarian inhabitants of the terra ferma were clamouring for political change and greater economic opportunity, albeit only by non-violent means.

Heavy-handed policing in response to an economic boycott of state monopolies in Austrian-held Milan led to the popular expulsion of the Austrian garrison in the city for five days in March 1848.

Shortly after, the news of revolt in Vienna reached Venice and lead the city to revolt against Austrian rule.

=== Insurrection and independence ===
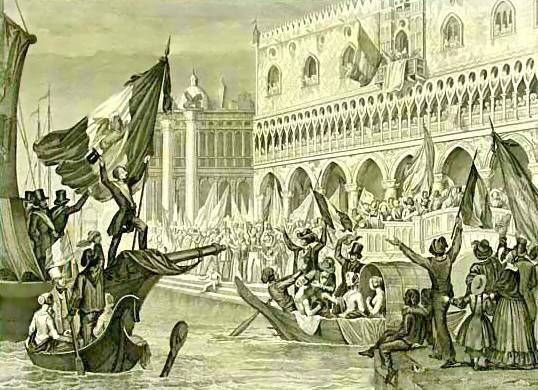
Daniele Manin proclaims the Republic of San Marco. Lithograph, dated ca. 1850.

A few days after the independence of Milan and Venice and their affiliation to the Kingdom of Sardinia, the Piedmontese army crossed into Lombardy on 24 March 1848, with the Austrian commander, Field Marshal Radetzky pulling back to the Quadrilatero, a chain of defensive fortresses between Milan and Venice. Two days previously, Daniele Manin entered the Venetian Arsenal with "a number of public-spirited Venetians", in a direct challenge to Austrian rule. As the Arsenalotti detested the Austrian overseers and the Italians in Austrian military service were pro-Venetian, Manin and his supporters moved about at will, unharmed. Believing that the timing was favourable, Manin led his followers out of the compound with the cry Viva San Marco! (English: Long Live St. Mark!)—the motto of the defunct Republic of Venice. Venetians, if not Austrian officials, accepted this to mean restoration of the old republic. With the exception of Verona, garrisoned as part of the Quadrilatero, the cities of Venetia — in particular Belluno, Padua, Rovigo, Treviso, Udine and Vicenza—immediately sided with the lagoon and rejected Austrian rule, proclaiming Manin president of the Republic of San Marco and investing him with dictatorial powers during the state of emergency. Manin's leadership was supported by the middle classes, revealing a permanent change in power from the mercantile patricians of the old republic, and his support of the lower classes, combined with promises of law and order to the bourgeoisie, meant his leadership was popular. Unfortunately, however, Manin did not have the leadership qualities that might have led to enduring independence, nor did Venice possess the military strength to defeat the Imperial Austrian Army.

=== Maintaining independence ===
King Charles Albert of Sardinia had occupied Milan and other Austrian territories with his army. But despite popular support in the Papal States, Tuscany, and the Two Sicilies for the Sardinian campaign, he chose to seek plebiscites in the occupied territories, rather than pursuing the retreating Austrians.

Despite enthusiastic support for Sardinia by the revolutionaries (the Republic of San Marco and Giuseppe Mazzini's Milanese volunteers), the Austrians started to regain ground. But the Austrian government was distracted by the Vienna Uprising, the Hungarian Revolution of 1848, and other Revolutions of 1848 in the Habsburg areas. So Radetzky was instructed to seek a truce, an order he ignored.

While Austria was pressed on every front, the divided Italians allowed her time to regroup and to reconquer Venice and the other troubled areas of the empire one by one.

Militarily, misreadings of the fluctuating political status in northern Italy—combined with Manin's indecision and ill-health, which confined him to bed at critical moments—led to several damaging poor judgements by Venice. The Austrian fleet was stationed in the formerly-Venetian port of Pola, in Istria. Despite Venice having much sympathy there, they made no effort to seize the fleet. Similarly, had the Venetians encouraged the desertion of Lombard-Venetian soldiers from the Austrian army, such trained and disciplined troops might have bolstered the Venetian army.

The Venetian revolutionaries also failed to incorporate the terra ferma (the Venetian mainland) into the lagoon-based republic effectively. While revolutionary reform generated some popular support for the new régime, the revolutionaries recruited few troops there. Mainlanders were mistrustful of Venetian power, probably as a result of old assumptions about the earlier Mariner Republic. This combined with destructive foraging and other damage, which might have been avoided had the revolutionaries recruited across terra ferma. While most of the middle and upper classes still supported the fight for independence, the lower classes of terra ferma were largely indifferent. The Venetian and Lombard troops of Radetzky's army remained mostly loyal and actively fought for Austria. Mainland recruits could have combined with the 2,000 Papal guards and Neapolitan soldiers under General Pepe, who ignored orders to retreat in favor of supporting the infant republics. But when Austrians under Nugent marched on Verona, and General Durando led a Piedmontese force to defend, Venice could only supply a few volunteers, later joined by Colonel Ferrari's Papal regulars. This was of no avail, as Nugent's force met up with Radetzky's forces and took Verona easily.

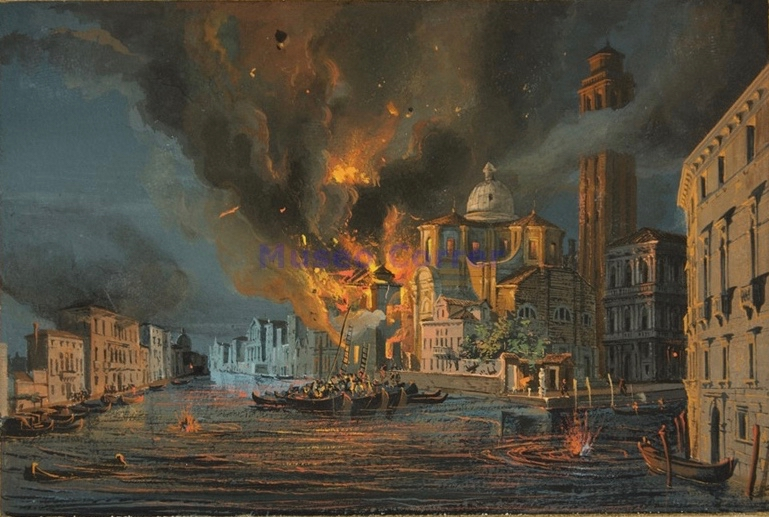
The church of San Geremia in Venice hit by the Austrian bombardment of 1849

Meanwhile, Manin retreated from his republican fervor, for fear of offending Charles Albert; this move was, however, both transparent and ineffectual. He also relied on reinforcement by Piedmontese and Papal troops, not understanding that Piedmont would not welcome a powerful republican neighbour when monarchies were under threat across Europe, or that Pope Pius IX could not continue to support war between two Catholic monarchs practically on his border. After the Italian rout at the Battle of Custoza on 29 July, Charles Albert abandoned Milan. When Radetzky offered its citizens free passage from the city, half the population left.

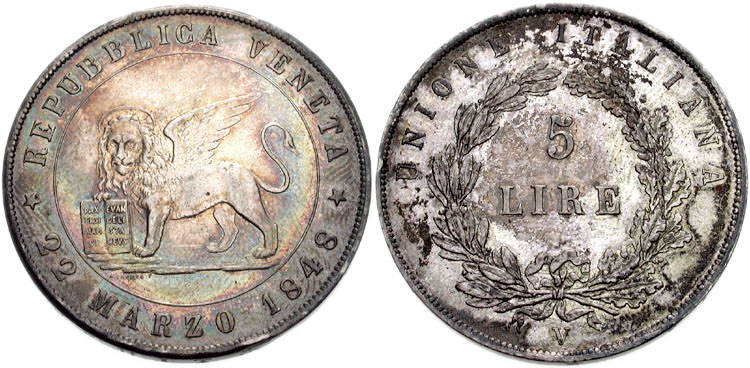
Five Venetian lire from the revolutionary republic

On 4 July 1848, the Venetian assembly voted 127–6 to approve Manin's proposal of subsumption into the Kingdom of Sardinia. This lasted only a month, as on 9 August Charles Albert signed an armistice that restored the Piedmontese border at the river Ticino. At the same time, the Piedmontese navy abandoned its support of Venice.

In early October, followers of Giuseppe Mazzini tried to organize a great republican demonstration, hoping to gain aid from the French Second Republic, convert the city into a centre of Italian liberation, and inspire Garibaldi into an anti-Austrian crusade. But Manin, to avoid offending Charles Albert, suppressed them. A "federal congress" was to meet in Turin on 12 October 1848, and Prime Minister Vincenzo Gioberti of Piedmont invited Venice to send delegates, but the Venetians declined. The revolutionary authorities' reaction to Piedmont's declaration of war on Austria illustrated their failure to grasp realities — the Venetian assembly recessed for two weeks.

=== Return to Austrian control ===
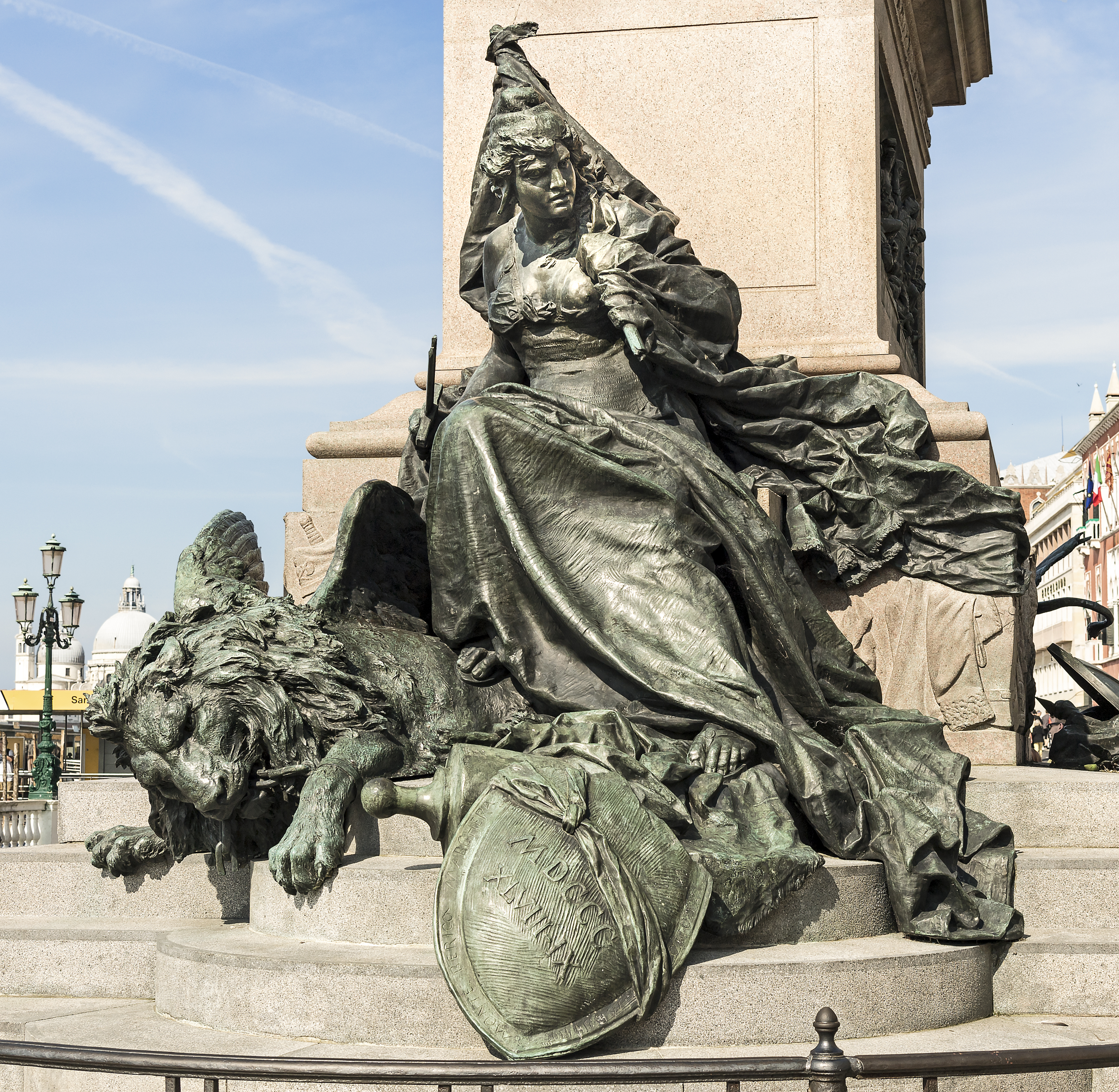
The 1887 bronze equestrian Monument to Victor Emmanuel II in Venice, modelled by Ettore Ferrari (1848–1929), stands on the Riva degli Schiavoni. The details show Venice in chains after the defeat in the 1848–49 Revolution. At her side, the Lion of Saint Mark in chains.

The crushing defeat of Italian forces at the Battle of Novara (23 March 1849) sounded a death knell for Italian independence from the Austrians. To avoid an occupation of Piedmont, Charles Albert abdicated in favour of his son Victor Emmanuel II, whose treaty with Austria required the complete removal of the Sardinian navy from Venetian waters. Manin addressed the Venetian assembly on 2 April 1849, and they voted to continue their struggle against the Austrians, despite an Austrian blockade of the city. On 4 May 1849, Radetzky started his attack on the Venetian fort of Marghera, held by 2500 troops under the Neapolitan command of Girolamo Ulloa. Bombardment of the lagoon and city started at the same time and, over the next three weeks alone, 60 000 projectiles were dispatched towards Venice. The bombardment also included self-detonating, unmanned balloons that dropped shrapnel on the city, which, despite its probably low overall effect on events as compared with the traditional artillery used, is cited by some historians as the first application of aerial bombardment in history. The fort at Marghera held out until 26 May, when Ulloa ordered its evacuation; an offer of surrender from Radetzky was rejected at this time.

By August, with famine and cholera sweeping the city, Manin proposed that the assembly vote for surrender, threatening to resign if the assembly voted to fight to the last. The assembly, however, agreed and provided the president with authority to seek terms, which were agreed on 22 August. Radetzky's entrance to Venice on 27 August marked the complete surrender of Venice to the Austrian Empire, restoring the status quo ante bellum and causing Manin to flee Italy, with his family and 39 fellow-revolutionaries, into exile. Manin's wife died of cholera within hours of their departure for Paris.

== Leadership ==
Leadership was effectively provided by Daniele Manin throughout the republic's brief existence, but the following heads of state were in place during the 17 months:

From	To	Officeholder(s)	Title
March 1848	March 1848	Giovanni Francesco Avesani	President of the Provisional Government
March 1848	July 1848	Daniele Manin	Chief Executive
July 1848	August 1848	Jacopo Castelli	President of the Provisional Government
August 1848	August 1848	Daniele Manin	Dictator
August 1848	March 1849	Daniele Manin	Triumvirate
August 1848	March 1849	CA Leone Graziani	Triumvirate
August 1848	March 1849	Col Giovanni Battista Cavedalis	Triumvirate
March 1849	August 1849	Daniele Manin	President of the Executive Power

== See also ==
- List of revolutions and rebellions
  - List of rebellions in the Habsburg monarchy
- Revolutions of 1848 in the Italian states
- Naval operations of the First Italian War of Independence
- Tuscan Republic (1849)
- Roman Republic (1849–1850)
