= List of public art in Milan =

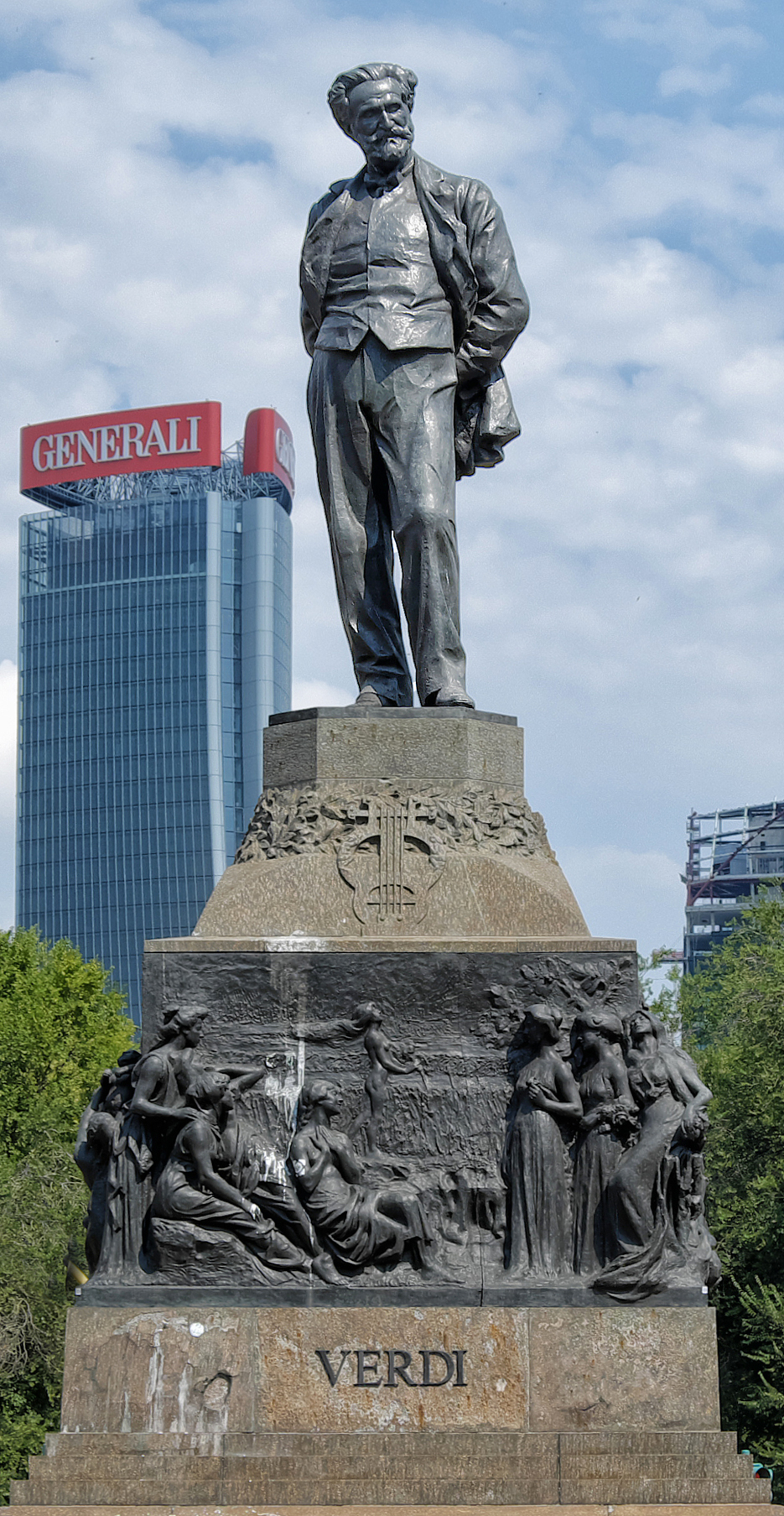
Monument to Verdi, Milan

Following is a list of notable artworks in Milan, Italy:

- Bagni misteriosi
- Colonna del Leone
- Equestrian statue of Victor Emmanuel II
- Equestrian statue of Giuseppe Garibaldi
- Equestrian statue of Napoleone III
- L.O.V.E.
- Madonnina
- La mela reintegrata
- Monument to Felice Cavallotti
- Monument to Camillo Benso, Count of Cavour
- Monument to the Carabinieri
- Monument to Emilio De Marchi
- Monument to the Five Days of Milan
- Monument to Francesco Hayez
- Monument to Ernesto Teodoro Moneta
- Monument to the Piccoli Martiri of Gorla
- Monument to Verdi
- Napoleon as Mars the Peacemaker
- Needle, Thread and Knot
- Personaggio
- Statue of John of Nepomuk
- Statue of Indro Montanelli
- Statue of Gaetano Negri
- Statue of Giulio Ricordi
- Statue of Antonio Rosmini
- Statue of Giuseppe Sirtori
- Wall of Dolls
- War Memorial of Musocco

== See also ==
- List of public art in Rome
- List of public art in Venice
