= Cornelia Sale Mocenigo Codemo =

Cornelia Sale Mocenigo Codemo (7 October 1792 in Vicenza – 29 November 1866 in Treviso) was an Italian poet and translator.

She was born to Filippo Luigi and Fiorenza Sale Manfredi Repèta, an aristocratic family from Vicenza. Filippo Luigi, as a marquis, was one of the Venetian noblemen who swore allegiance to Archduke John of Austria following Austria's victory in the Battle of Tolentino (1815). A poet and translator herself, Fiorenza Vendramin was ultimately remembered for her suicide. It followed a love affair with a Spanish diplomat in her youth, her forced marriage to Filippo Luigi, and another love affair with a French officer. Cornelia identified this loss, which she experienced at age three, as the defining event of her childhood.

In 1814, Cornelia married Alvise I Mocenigo, Count of Cordignano. His family came from Venice's patrician nobility. As such, their nobility was confirmed under Austrian rule. The couple had three children. After Alvise I's death in 1837, she married Michelangelo Codemo, a learned man from a low-income family who had earlier served in her household's staff. They had two daughters. Their eldest daughter, born before Alvise I's death, was Luigia Codemo, who wrote over two-dozen volumes of poems, short stories, novels, and plays about rustic themes.

== Works ==
Like her mother and daughter, Cornelia wrote poetry and published translations. Much of her poetry was published in newspapers or as short volumes on special occasions. These include:

1. "Ode" in In morte di Antonietta Trevisan Gabardi (Padova: Cartellier, 1835).
2. "Per illustri nozze militari. Ode. ['On the occasion of an illustrious military wedding. Ode'] in Giornale Euganeo (Padova: Crescini, 1844).
3. Versioni dal greco di Cornelia Sale-Codemo vedova Mocenigo pubblicata per le auspicatissime nozze Di Rovero-Sanseverin ['Translations from the Greek by Cornelia Sale-Codemo, widow of Mocenigo, published for the hoped-for wedding of Rovero-Sanseverin'] (Treviso: tip. vescovile G. Trento di proprieta G. Longo, 1847).
4. Canzone pel IX Congresso degli Scienziati italiani in Venezia nel 1847 ['A song for the 9th Congress of Italian Scientists in Venice in 1847.'] (Treviso: Longo, 1847)
5. Versi di Cornelia Sale-Mocenigo-Codemo publicati pel primo sacrifizio dell'altare che celebra il 18 agosto 1850 nella chiesa parocchiale di Segusino il sacerdote d. Giovanni Finardi ['Verses by Cornelia Sale-Mocenigo-Codemo published for the first sacrifice to the altar celebrated on 18 August 1850 in the parish church of Segusino by the priest Giovanni Finardi'] (Treviso: Tipografia Andreola, 1850). Giovanni Finardi was related to her through Anna Finardi, née Codemo.

Cornelia gained a reputation for her translation of the Odyssey to Italian. She first vernacularized Homer's work in Italian prose to facilitate her study of Greek and then, at the encouragement of Niccolò Tommaseo, to popularize it among readers. For this work, she supposedly received a letter of commendation from the Prussian ruler.

She published longer, standalone works in her final years. In 1859, she published I flagelli d'Egitto, poemetto biblico ['The Scourges of Egypt, a Biblical poem'] (Treviso: Andreola Medesin). This was followed by Autobiografia di una fanciulla ['Autobiography of a girl'] (Venice: Naratovich, 1863). A complete collection of her poems, totaling over 400 pages, was published by her daughter Luigi in 1868.
