= Enrico Cassi =

Italian sculptor

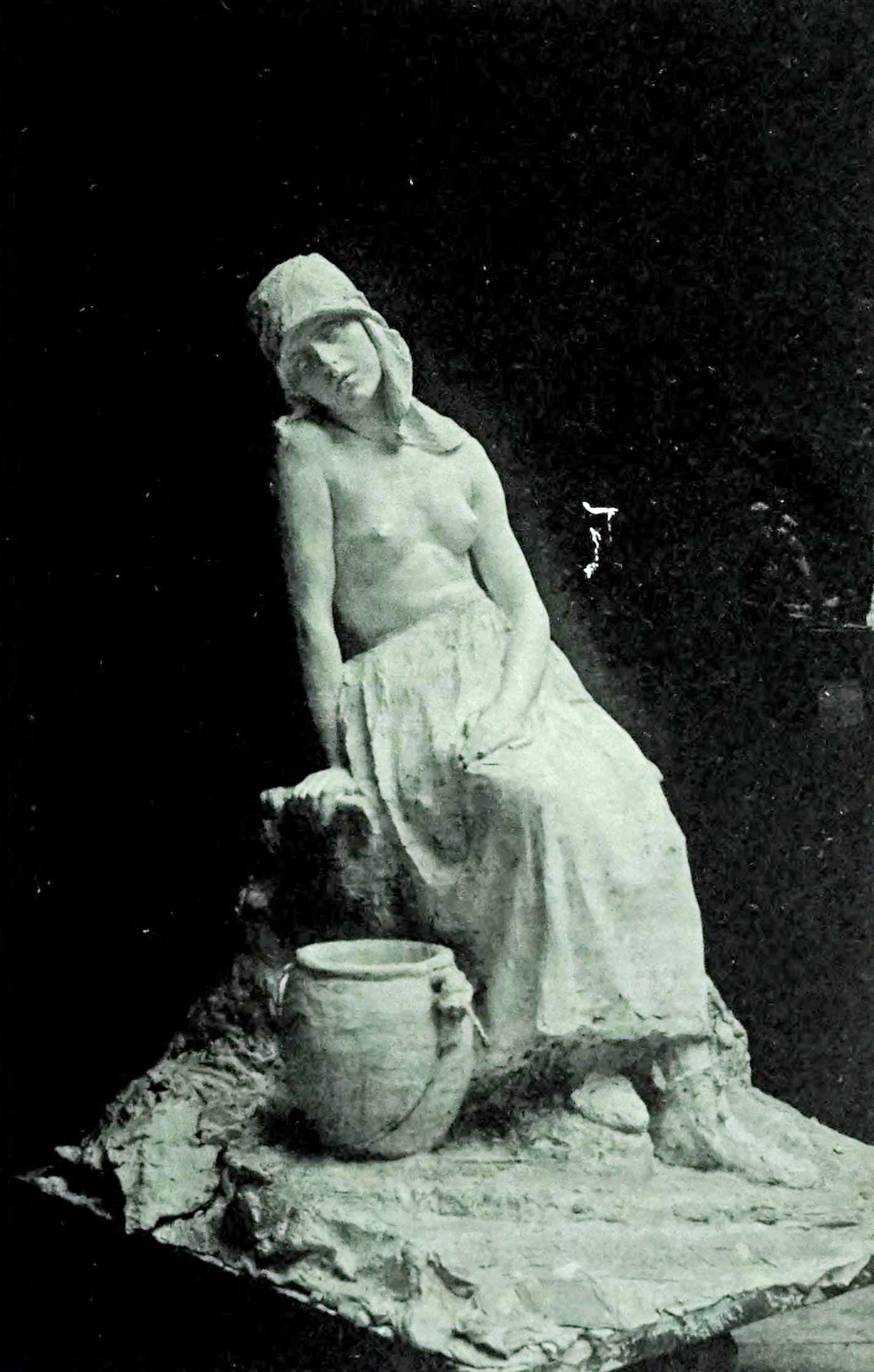
Emigrata

Enrico Cassi (December 1863 – 12 February 1913) was an Italian sculptor.

== Biography ==
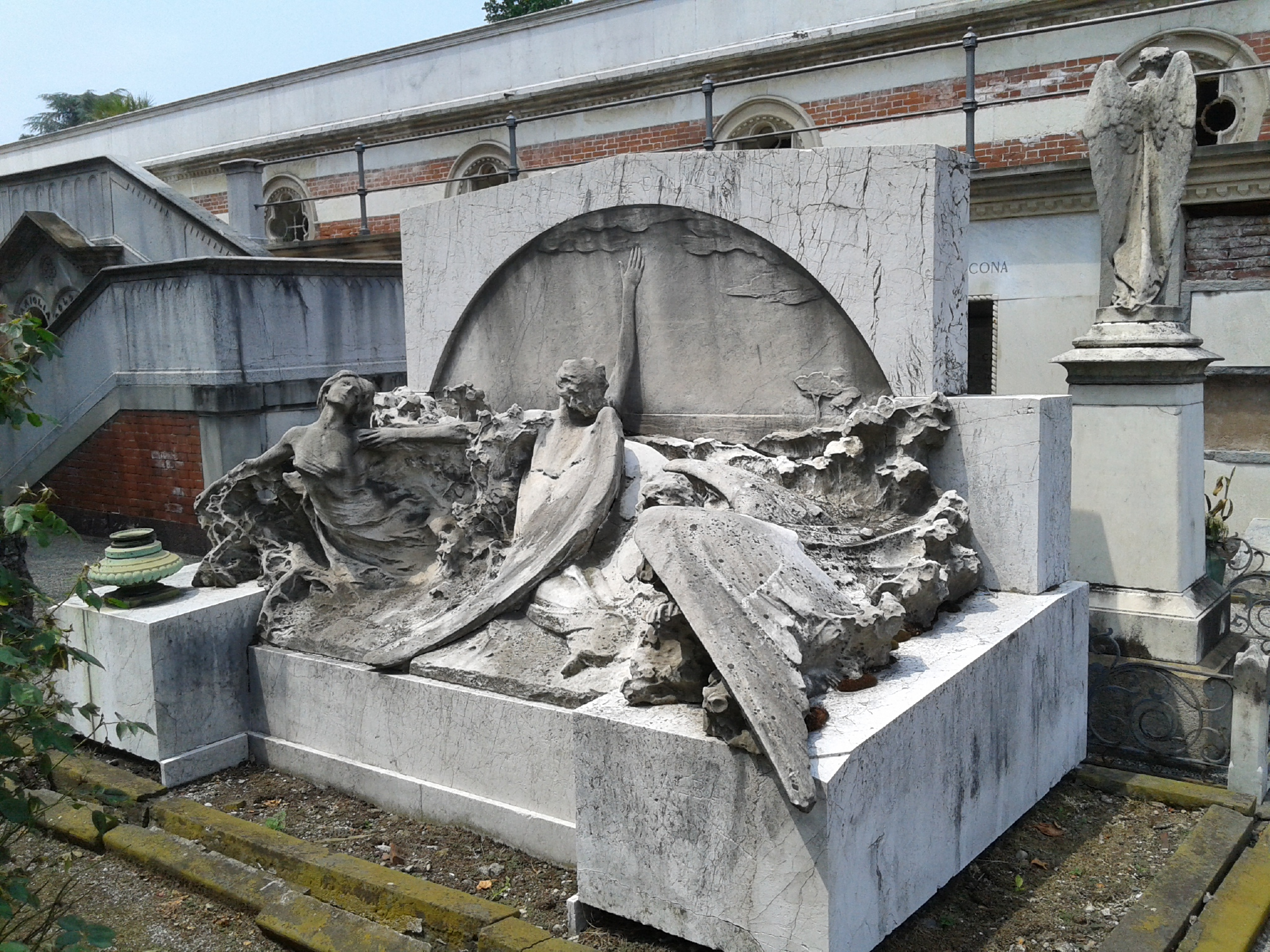
Tomb of the Daninos family in the Milan Cemetery

He was born in Varese, Comune, Italy. His father a marble worker in Pavia, was able to have Enrico study sculpting at the Brera Academy under Francesco Barzaghi and Enrico Butti. In 1891, at the Triennale of the Brera, he received praise for his sculpture titled Emigrata. In 1894, paradoxically, his sculpture titled War won a national award from the Society of the Peace. He completed a site at Porta Venezia in Milan, the Monument to Luciano Manara, left incomplete by Barzaghi. He also completed a Monument to General Dezza for Milan. In 1909, he completed the monument to the Cairoli family in Pavia. He is also known for his works in the Cimitero Monumentale of Milan, including the tomb monument of the Daninos family.

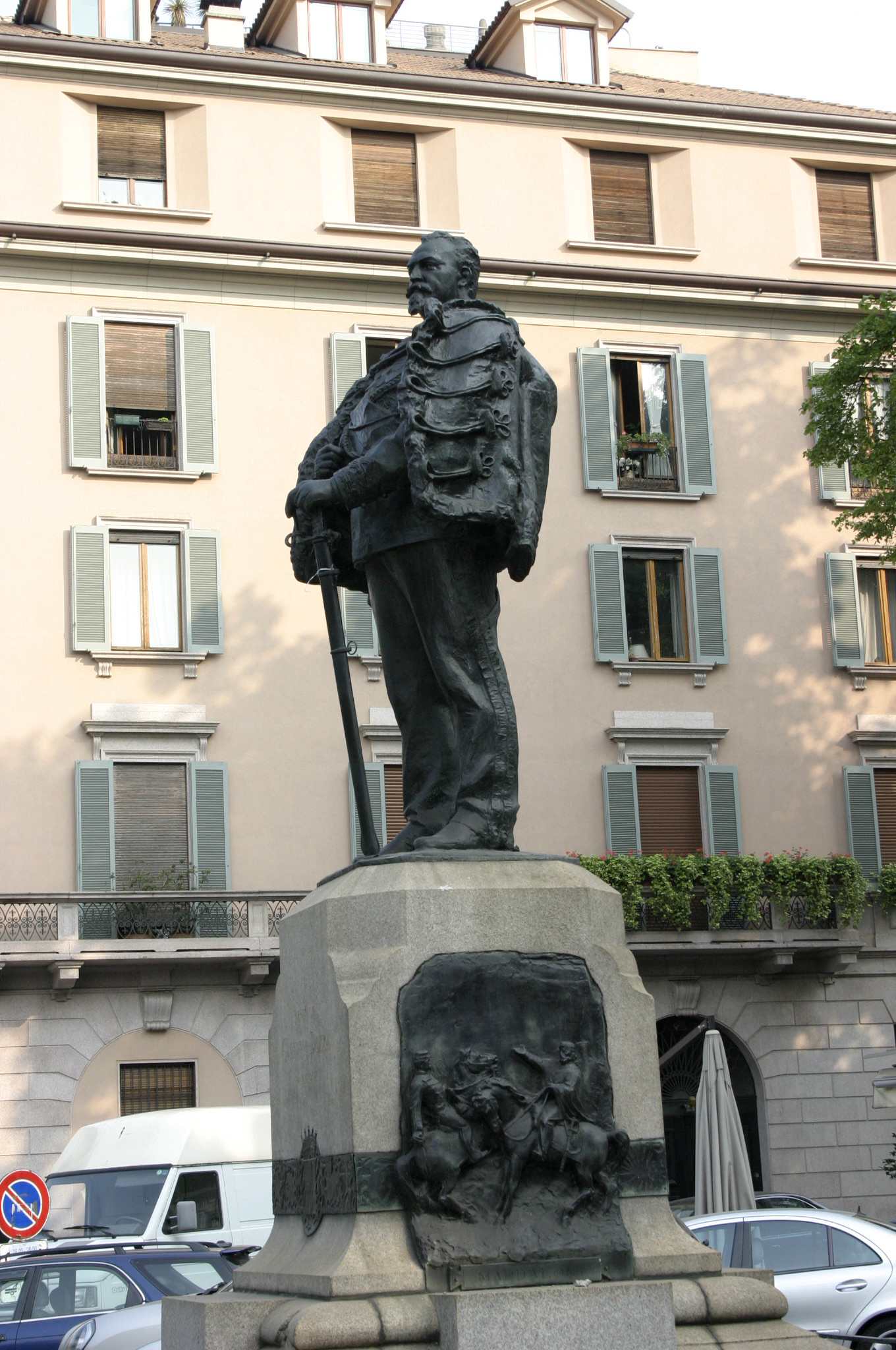
Monument to General Giuseppe Dezza, Milan
