= Equestrian statue of Napoleone III =

Monument in Milan, Italy

Equestrian statue of Napoleon III
- Monumento a Napoleone III
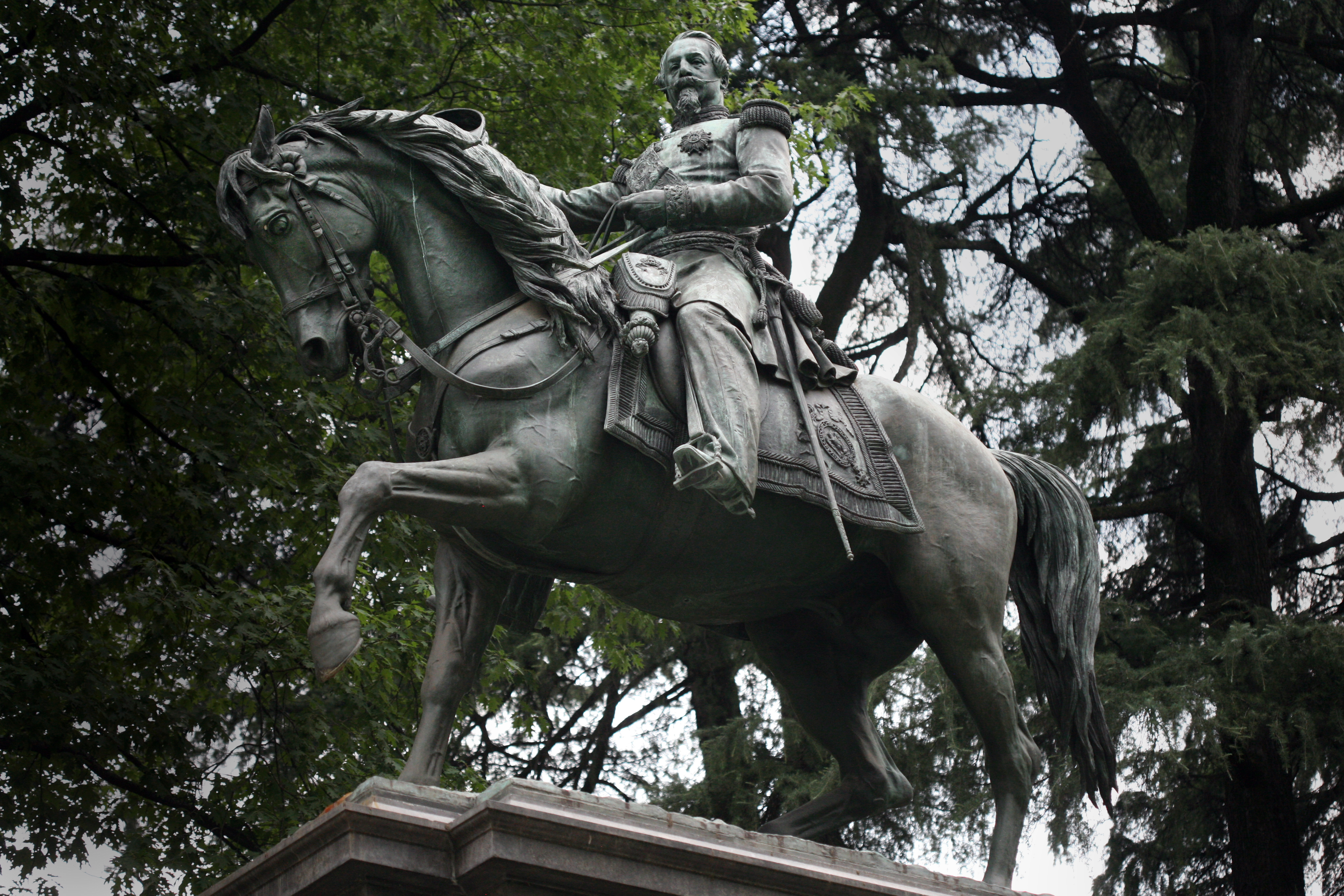
- The monument in Parco Sempione
- Interactive map of Equestrian statue of Napoleon III
- Location: Parco Sempione, Milan, Italy
- Coordinates: 45.4746°N 9.1764°E
- Designer: Francesco Barzaghi
- Type: Equestrian statue
- Material: Bronze (statue); Granite (pedestal)
- Beginning date: 1881
- Completion date: 1881
- Dedicated date: 1927
- Dedicated to: Napoleon III

The Monument to Napoleon III and the French Army (Monumento a Napoleone III e all'Esercito Francese) is a commemorative monument by the sculptor Francesco Barzaghi, located in Parco Sempione in Milan, Italy. It is topped by an equestrian statue of Napoleon III, and its base bears the names of French soldiers killed in the Second Italian War of Independence.

The Milan city council commissioned the monument in 1873, following the death of Napoleon III, to commemorate the role of France as Italy's ally in the war . The project met strong political opposition that delayed its completion for decades: the Radicals objected to honouring a ruler whose troops had fought against Giuseppe Garibaldi's volunteers at the Battle of Mentana on 3 November 1867. The statue was kept for many years in the courtyard of the Palazzo del Senato and was only installed on its present site in 1927. Surrounded by vegetation, the monument receives little attention today despite its historical significance.
