= Statue of Niccolò Tommaseo =

Monument in Venice, Italy

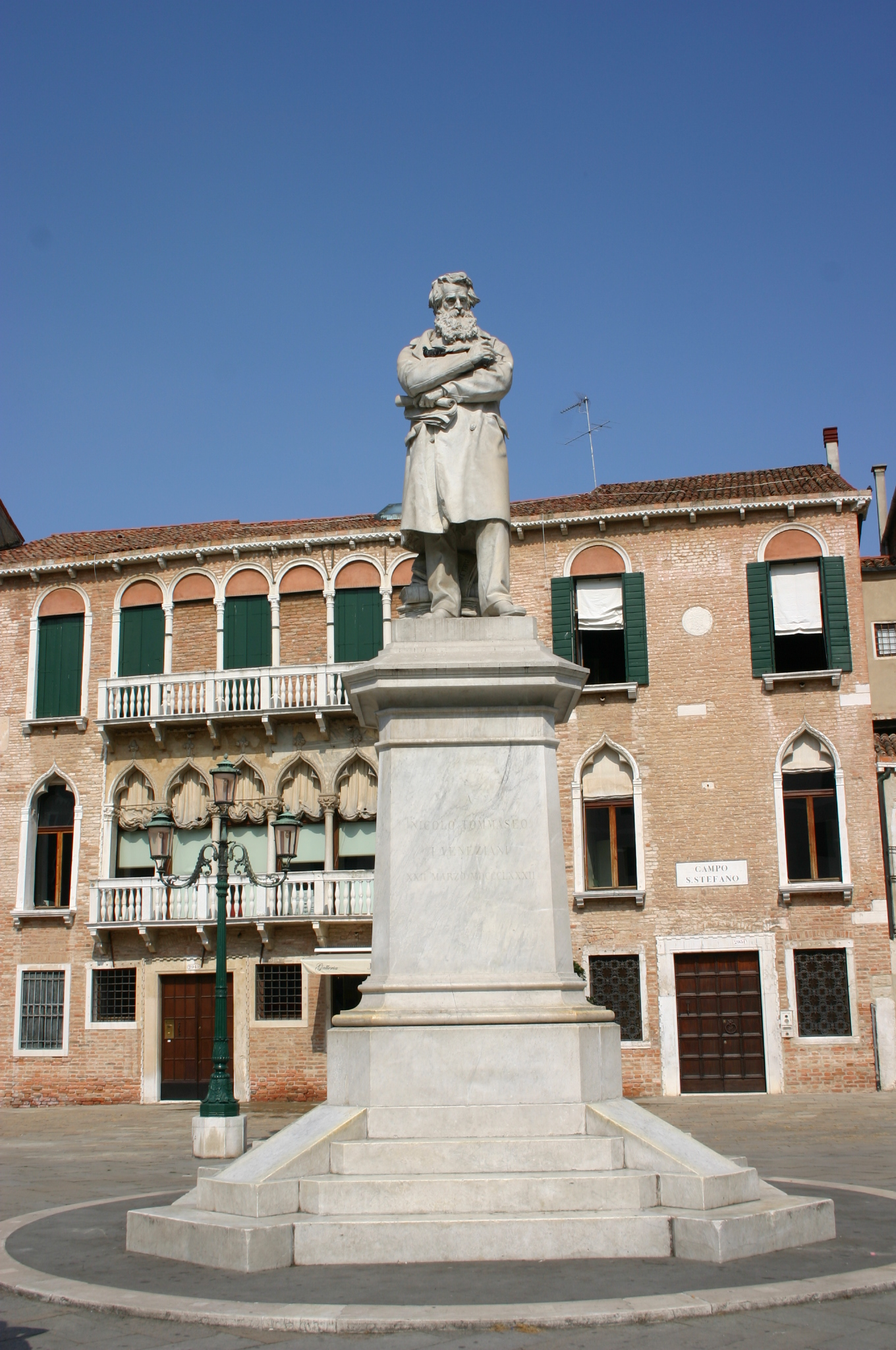
- Statue in Campo Santo Stefano
- Artist: Francesco Barzaghi
- Completion date: 1882
- Subject: Niccolò Tommaseo
- Location: Venice; 45°26′00″N 12°19′50″E

A statue of Niccolò Tommaseo by Francesco Barzaghi is installed in Venice, Italy.

== See also ==
- List of public art in Venice
