= Revenge Triptych =

Set of three paintings by Francesco Hayez

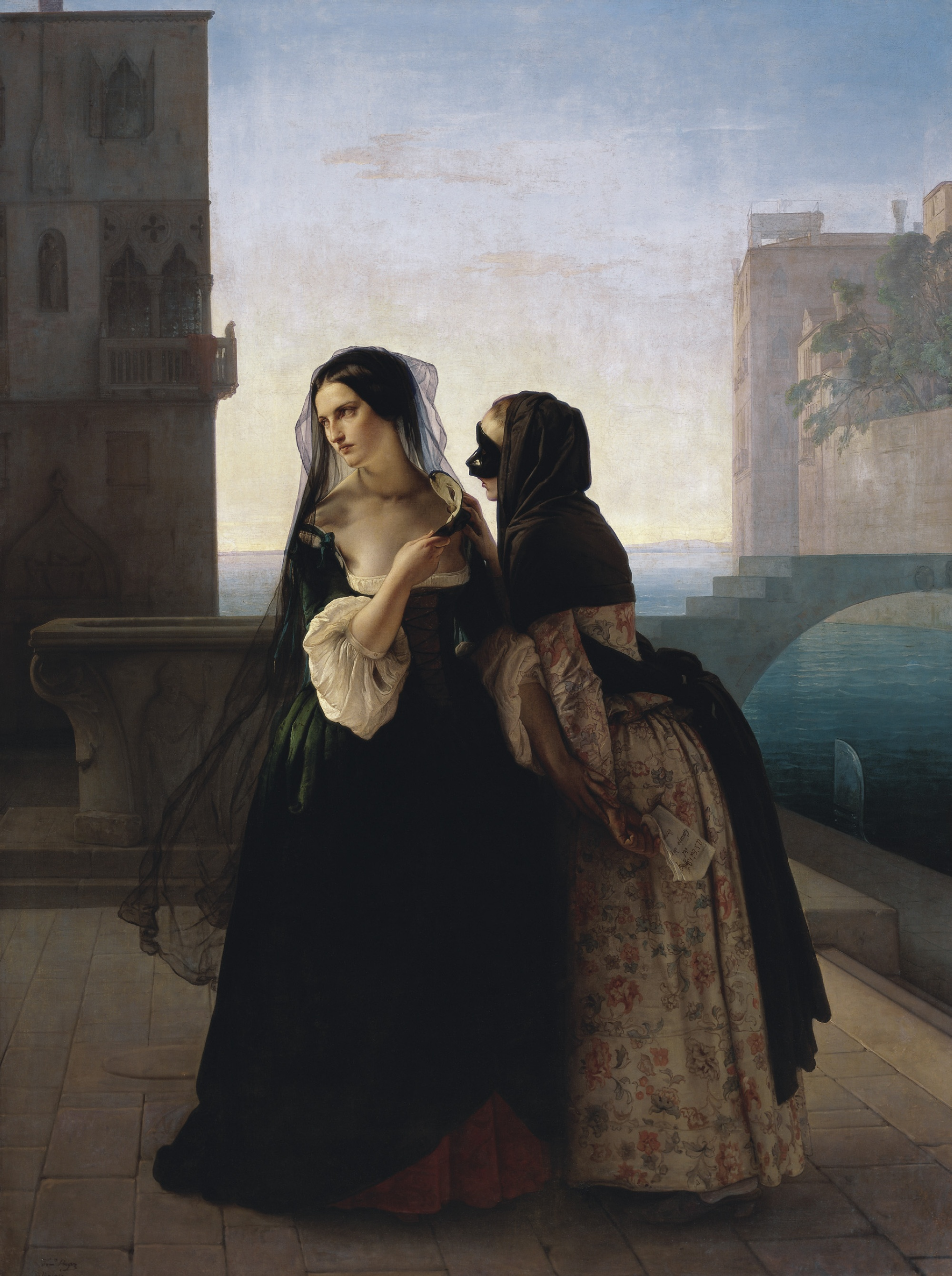
Francesco Hayez, Consiglio alla vendetta, (1851), 237x178cm.

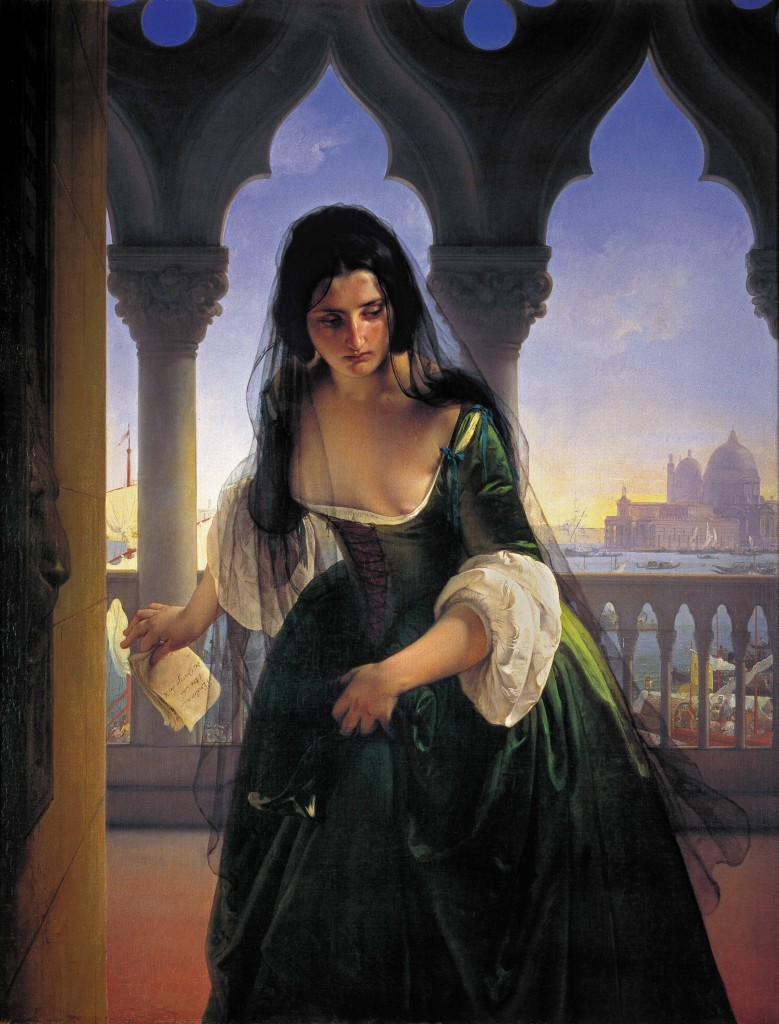
Francesco Hayez, Accusa segreta, (1847–1848), 153x120cm.

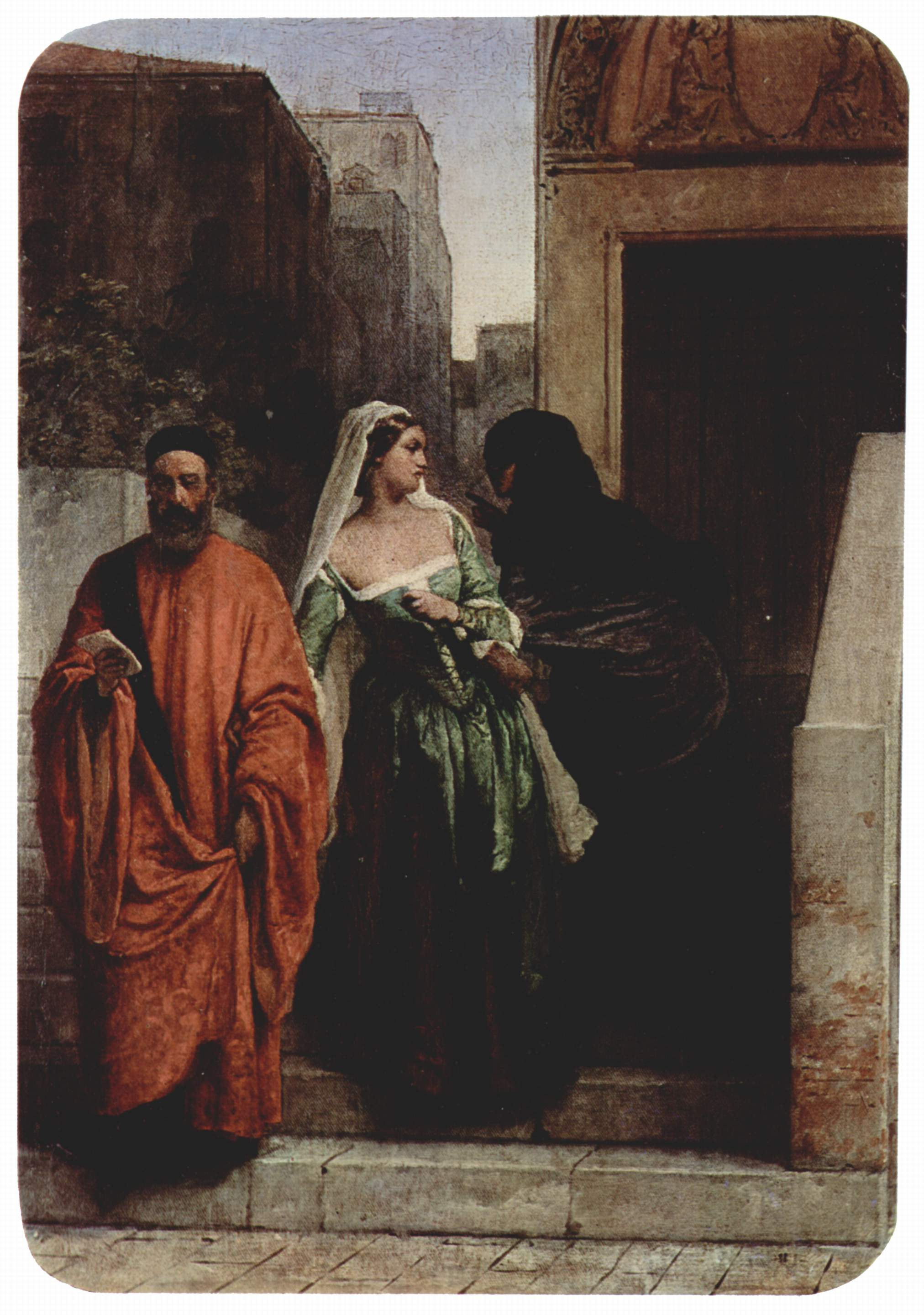
Francesco Hayez, La vendetta di una rivale, (1853), 55x40cm.

The Revenge Triptych (Italian - Trittico della Vendetta) is a set of three mid-19th-century oil-on-canvas paintings by Francesco Hayez. They centre on a woman named Maria and her revenge upon a lover who has betrayed her.

== Vengeance is Sworn ==
Vengeance is Sworn (Consiglio alla vendetta) was produced in 1851, the second work to be produced but showing the first episode of the three. It is now in the Liechtenstein Museum in Vienna. It shows Maria's friend Rachel advising her to use political denunciation for vengeance on her lover.

== Secret Accusation ==
Secret Accusation (Accusa segreta) was painted in 1847–1848, the first of the three but showing the second episode. It is now in the Musei Civici di Pavia. Its dating is based on a print of it by Giuseppe Barni based on a drawing by Luigi Toccagni in the catalogue for the 1850 Breda exhibition. It shows Maria posting the letter anonymously denouncing her lover.

== Revenge of a Rival ==
The third work to be produced (in 1853) was Revenge of a Rival (La vendetta di una rivale) or The Venetian Woman (Le veneziane). It shows the third episode, Maria repenting of her actions and trying to stop her denunciation being delivered. Its present location is unknown, though a late copy now in the Villa Carlotta was probably made after the original's success at the Brera exhibition of 1853. It was also copied as a bronze bas-relief for the base of Francesco Barzaghi's monument to Hayez on piazza di Brera in Milan.

== Bibliography (in Italian) ==
- Mazzocca, Fernando. 1994. Francesco Hayez, Catalogo ragionato. Milano, Federico Motta Editore.
- Mazzocca, Fernando. 1983. Hayez. Electa.
- Ottino della Chiesa, Angela. 1982. Francesco Hayez a Villa Carlotta. Estratto della rivista Como, p. 6, 7.
- Gatta, M. 1853. Le Veneziane. Quadro di Francesco Hayez, commissione del sig. don Alessandro Negorni Prato, in "Album, esposizione di belle arti", p. 4.
