= Monument to Francesco Hayez, Milan =

Coordinates: 45.47154°N 9.18814°E

Monument to Francesco Hayez
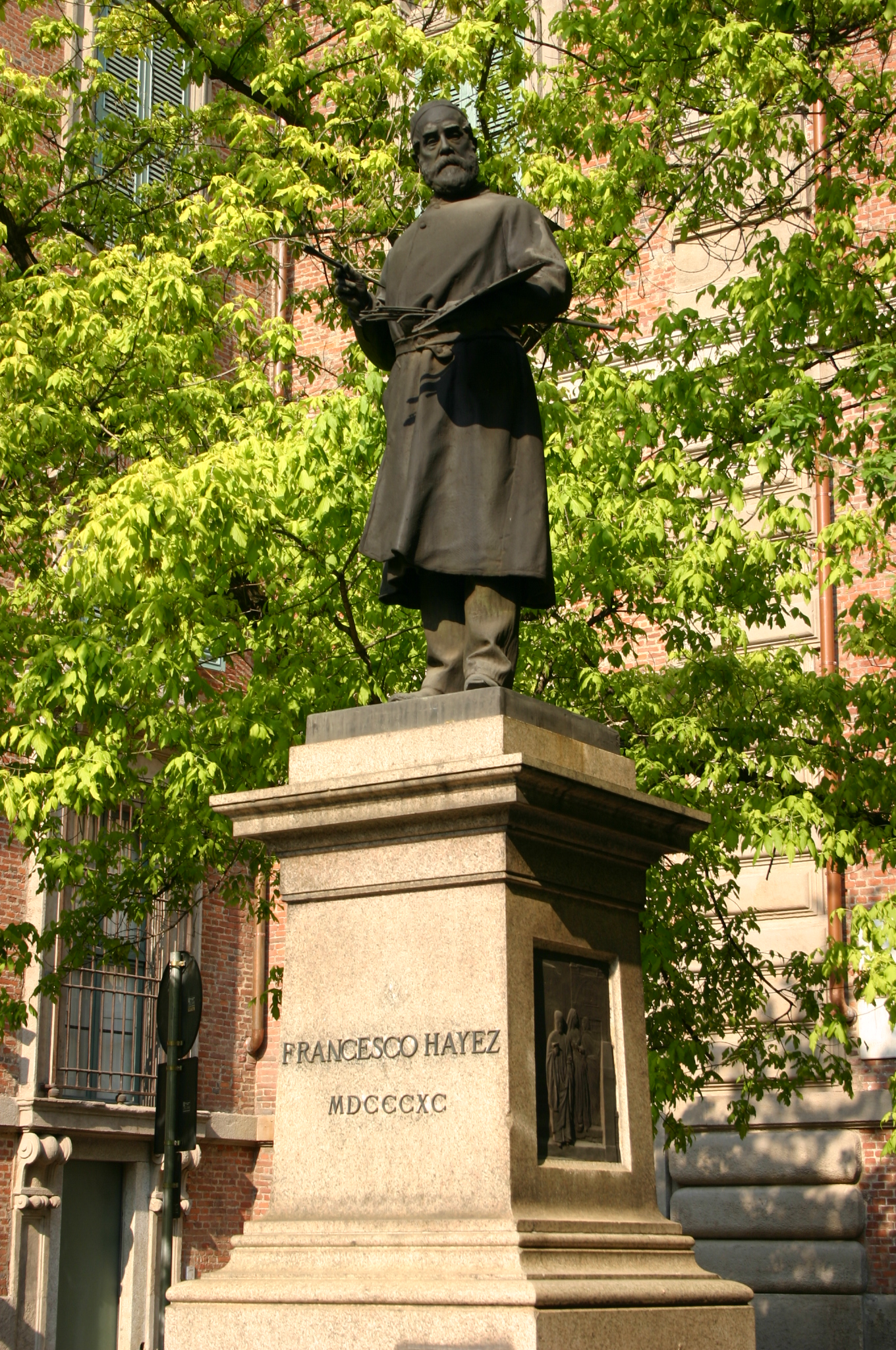
- Interactive map of Monument to Francesco Hayez
- Location: Piazzetta Brera, Milan, Italy
- Designer: Francesco Barzaghi
- Type: Statue and plinth
- Material: Bronze
- Dedicated date: 10 February 1890
- Dedicated to: Francesco Hayez

The Monument to Francesco Hayez is a bronze sculpture on a plinth located in piazzetta Brera (a small park just south of the main facade of the Brera Academy in Milan, Italy. The statue was commissioned in 1884, two years after the painter's death, from the sculptor Francesco Barzaghi, and inaugurated on 10 February 1890, on the seventh anniversary of his death.

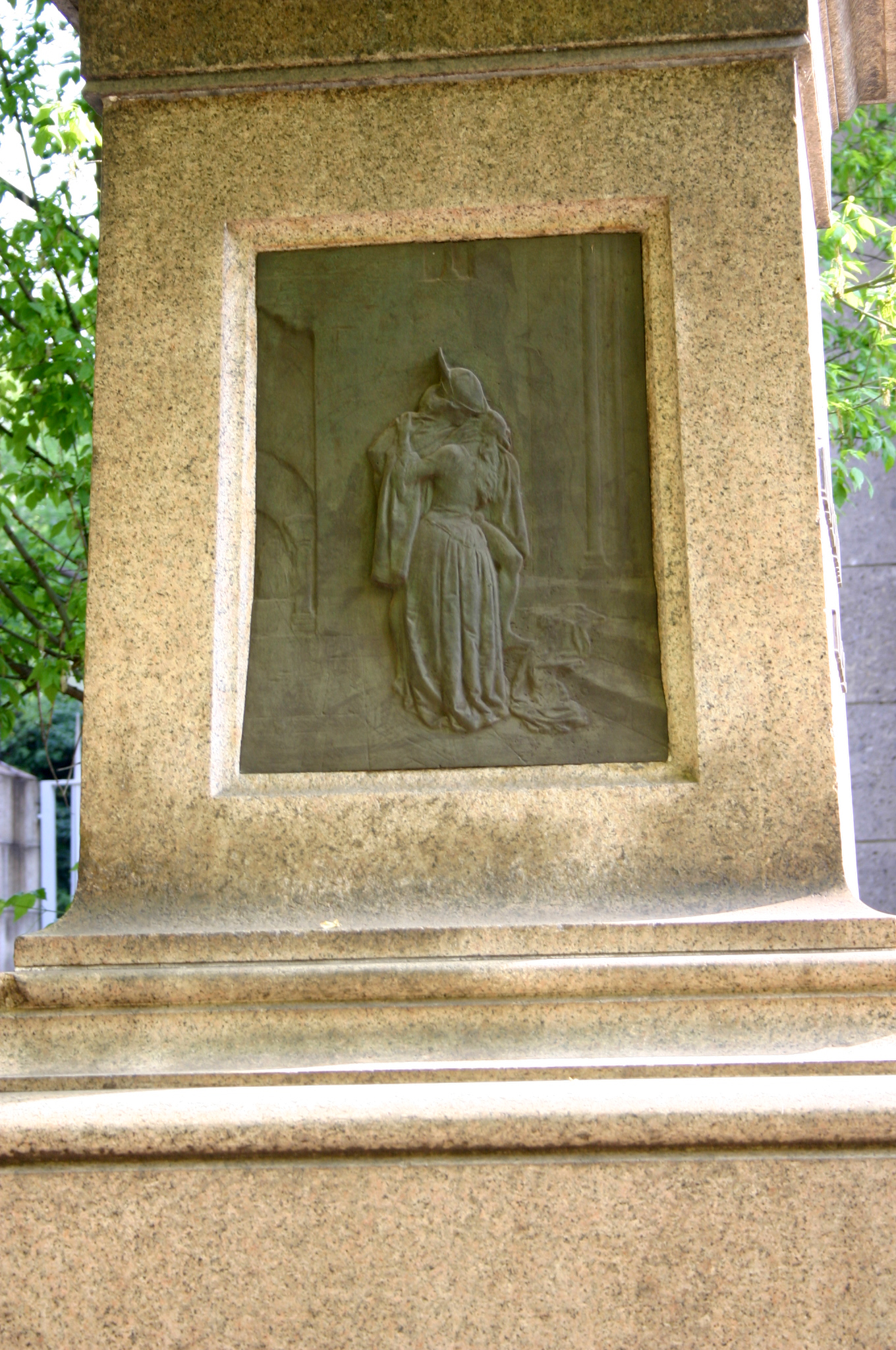
Relief depicting The Kiss

The plinth of the statue has two bas-reliefs in bronze depicting two of best known paintings: The Kiss and Le Veneziane (also known as La vendetta d'una rivale and one painting in the Revenge Triptych). Hayez is depicted standing in the act of painting with a brush. The inauguration was attended by Hayez's friends, Tranquillo Cremona and Luigi Bisi, and by Giuseppe Mongeri and the count Francesco Sebregondi, secretary of the Academy of Fine Arts in Milan, as well as Hayez's widow, Angiolina Rossi. The main speech was given by the academy's president Emilio Visconti Venosta. Attending the ceremony were representatives from academies of Venice (Cavalieri Iacopo d'Andrea, professor of painting; Giacomo Franco, professor of architecture and director of the Royal Institute of Fine Arts; and Giuseppe Soranzo); Florence (Professor Camillo Boito); Turin (Professor Bartolomeo Giuliani); Bologna (engineer Solmi); Bergamo (Count Gianforte Suardi; and Rome (Senator Tullo Massarani and professor Giuseppe Bertini).
