= Statue of Antonio Rosmini =

Sculpture in Milan, Italy

- Monumento ad Antonio Rosmini
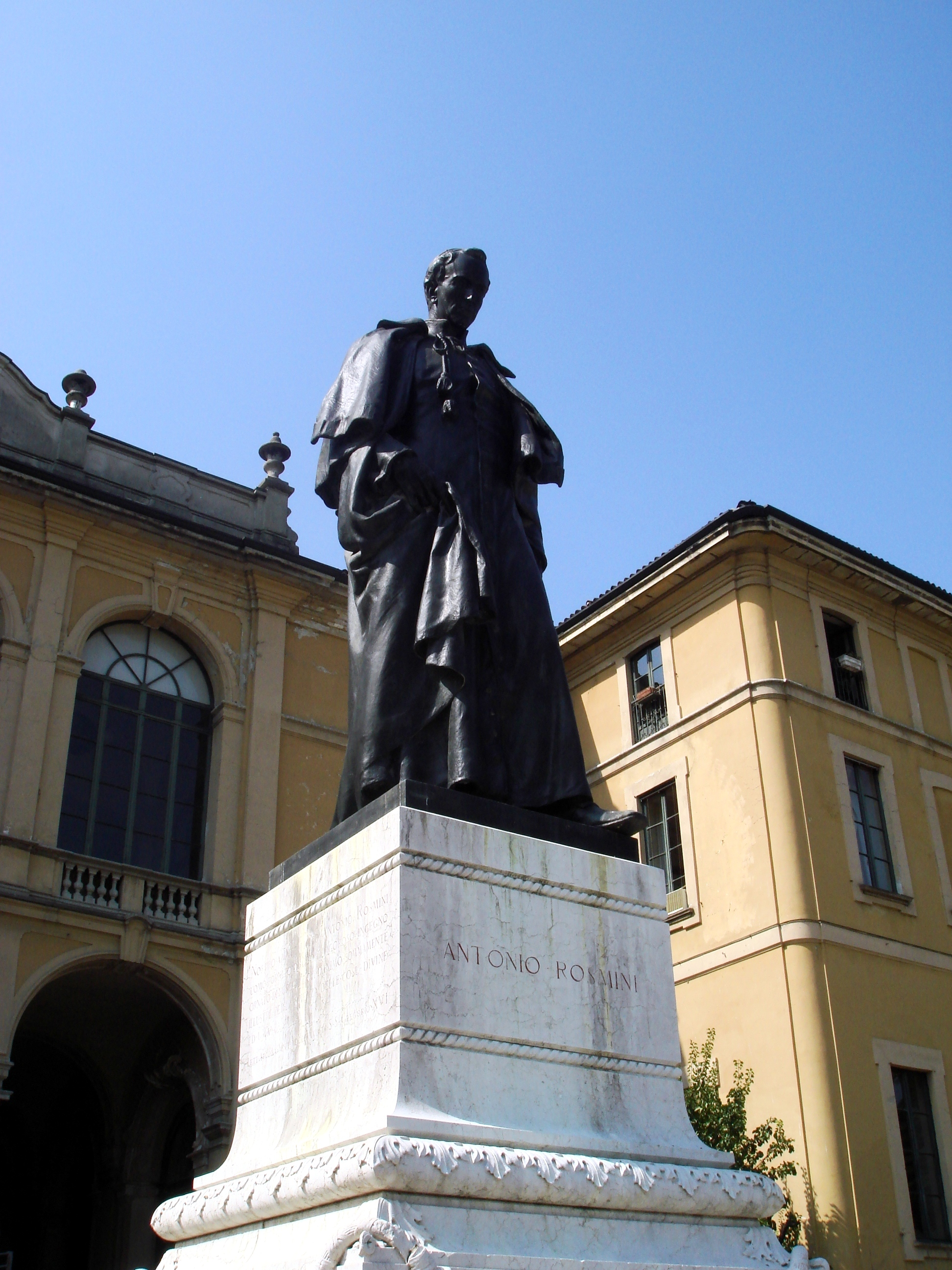
- The statue in 2007
- Interactive map of Statue of Antonio Rosmini
- Location: Giardini Pubblici Indro Montanelli, Milan, Italy
- Designer: Francesco Confalonieri
- Type: Statue
- Material: Bronze
- Dedicated date: 1896
- Dedicated to: Antonio Rosmini

A statue of Antonio Rosmini is installed in Milan, Italy.
