= Monument to the Carabinieri, Milan =

Coordinates: 45.46060°N 9.18812°E

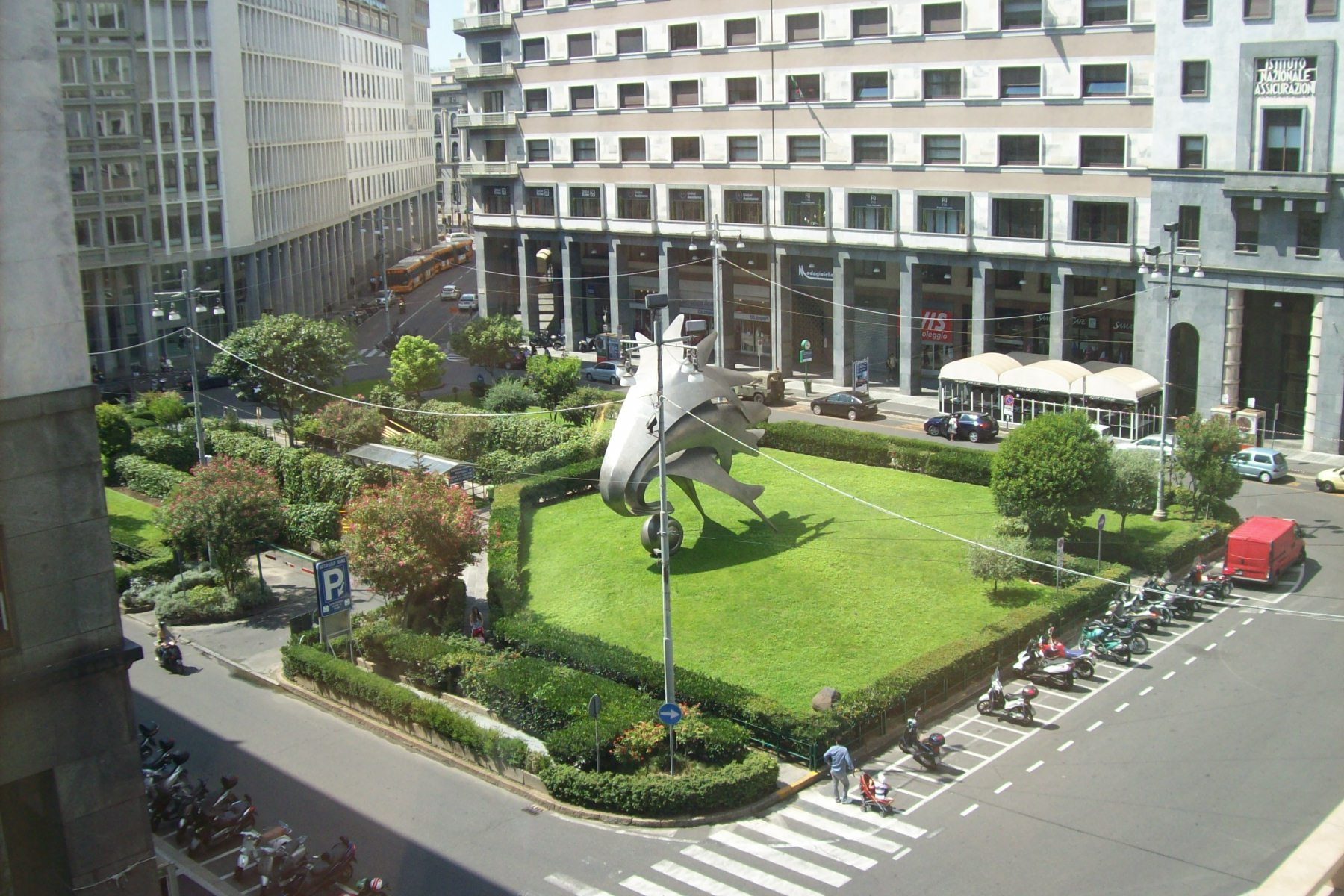
View Piazza Diaz from the North

The Monument to the Carabinieri, also called Monumento alla Fiamma dei Carabinieri (Monument to the Flame of Carabinieri) is a steel sculpture located in Piazza Armando Diaz, a central square in Milan, Italy. The monument was created by Italian sculptor Luciano Minguzzi (1911–2004) and is dedicated to the men and women of Carabinieri, the Italian gendarmerie. The flame which inspired the sculpture is a heraldic symbol prominently displayed on the caps of the corp, but it also artistically depicts a grenade, inscribed with the letters IR (an acronym for Italian Republic), and from which curving flames with 13 tips emerge. The flames marks the loyalty, fidelity, ardor and honor that define Carabinieri's service.

The monument was commissioned to Minguzzi in 1972 and inaugurated on 3 December 1981, at the presence of Giovanni Spadolini, then President of the Milan City Council, and Carabinieri General Carlo Alberto dalla Chiesa. A plaque at the base of the monument honoring the memory of dalla Chiesa was added a year later. Dalla Chiesa, who had led the Italian military's anti-terrorism forces in Lombardy in the mid-1970s, mainly directed against the Red Brigades, was ambushed and assassinated with his wife and their driver by the Mafia when he was appointed Prefect of Palermo.
