= Monument to Camillo Benso, Count of Cavour =

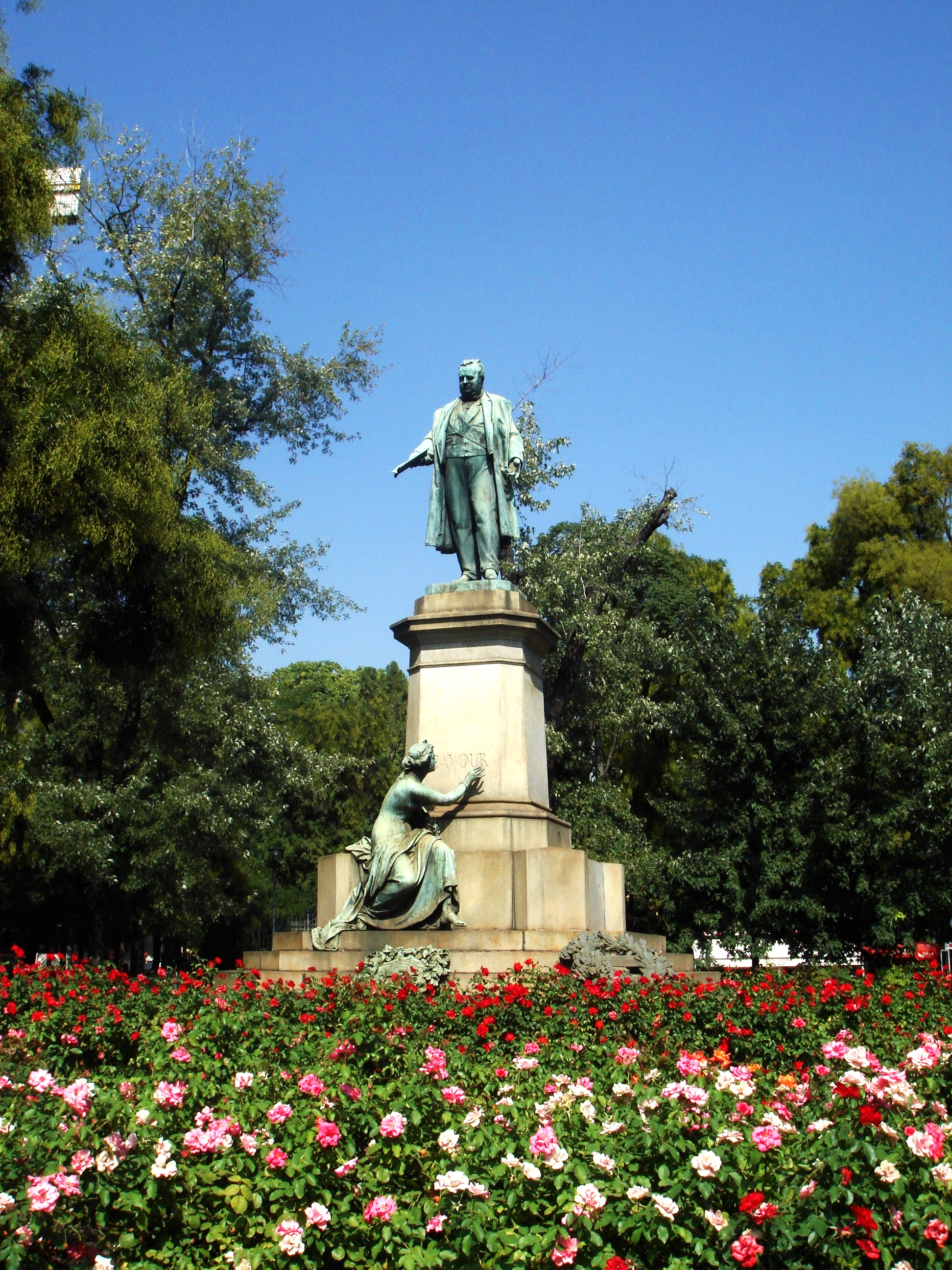
- The monument in 2007
- Medium: Sculpture
- Location: Milan
- 45.4721°N 9.1947°E

The monument to Camillo Benso, Count of Cavour is installed in Milan, Italy.
