= Statue of Gaetano Negri =

Monument in Milan, Italy

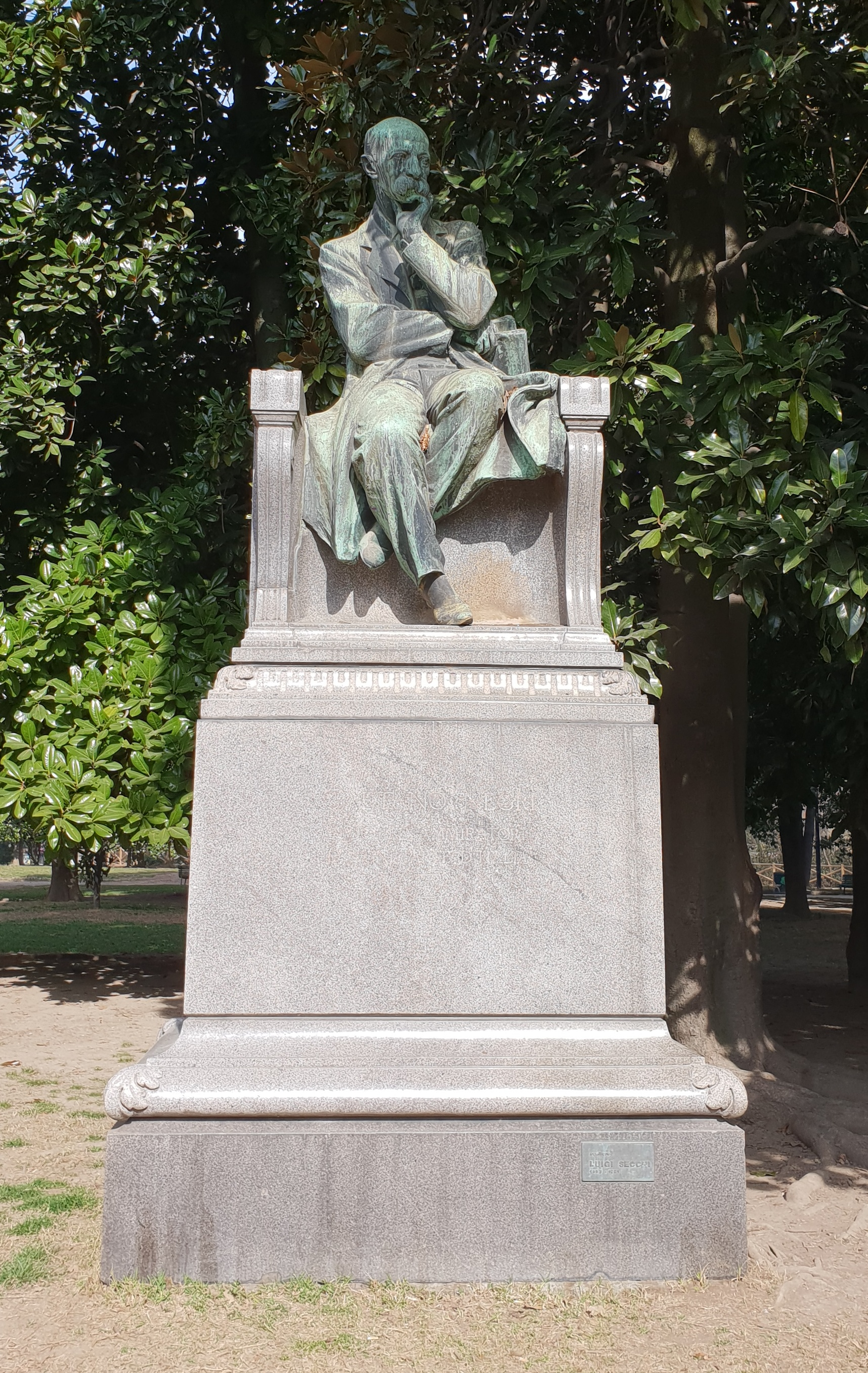
- The monument in 2019
- Interactive map of Statue of Gaetano Negri
- Coordinates: 45°28′27″N 9°11′56″E

A statue of Gaetano Negri is installed in Milan, Italy.
