= Equestrian statue of Victor Emmanuel II, Milan =

Monument by Ercole Rosa in Milan, Italy

Equestrian statue of Victor Emmanuel II
- Monumento a Vittorio Emanuele II
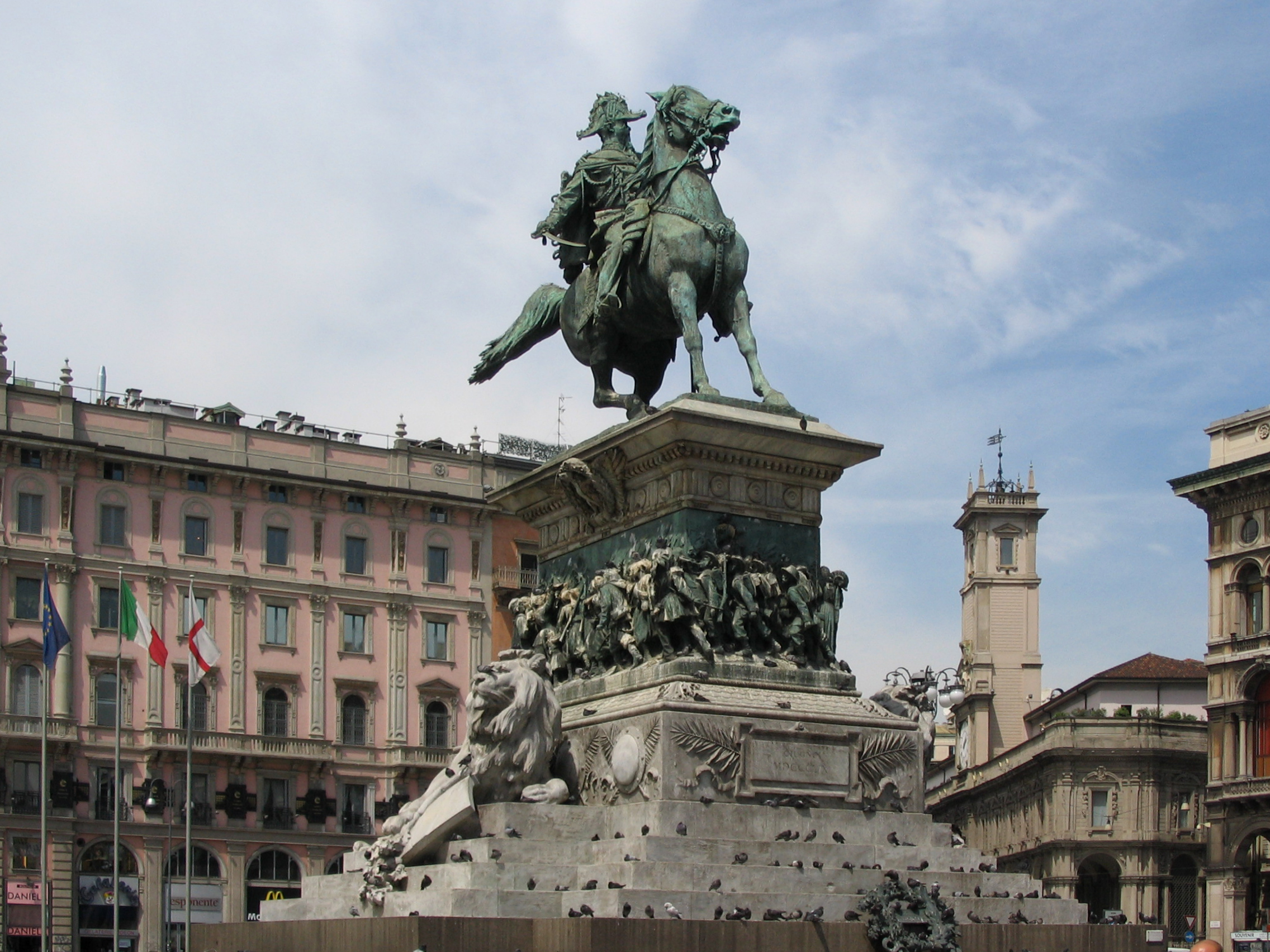
- The monument in 2007
- Interactive map of Equestrian statue of Victor Emmanuel II
- Location: Piazza del Duomo, Milan, Italy
- Coordinates: 45.4643°N 9.1894°E
- Designer: Ercole Rosa
- Type: Equestrian statue
- Material: Bronze and Marble
- Beginning date: 1878
- Completion date: 1896
- Dedicated to: Victor Emmanuel II

An equestrian statue of Victor Emmanuel II is installed in Milan, Italy.

== See also ==
- Equestrian statue of Victor Emmanuel II, Rome
