= Statue of Giuseppe Sirtori =

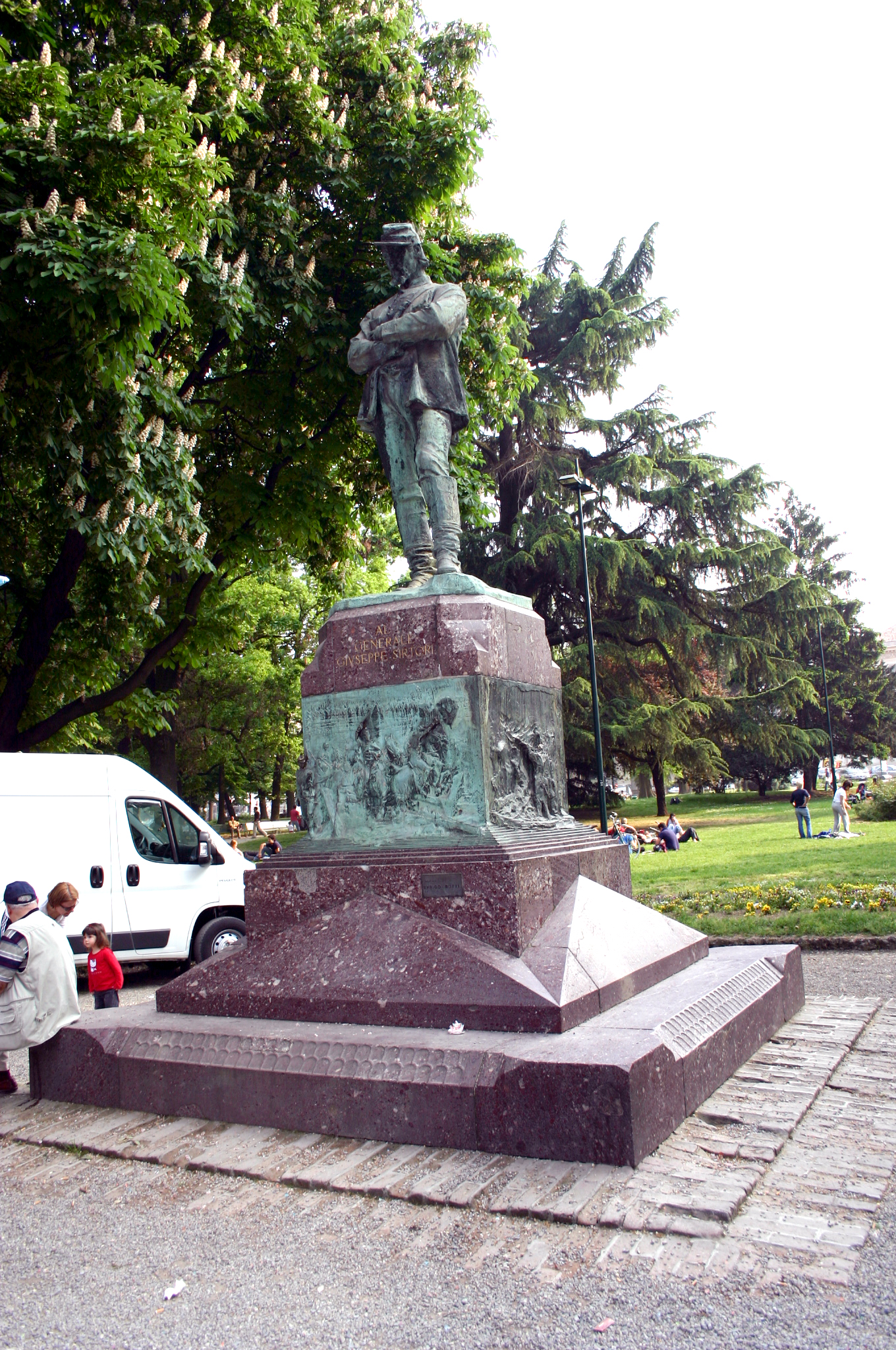
The monument in 2007

A statue of Giuseppe Sirtori is installed in Milan, Italy.
