= Personaggio =

Sculpture by Rachele Bianchi in Milan, Italy

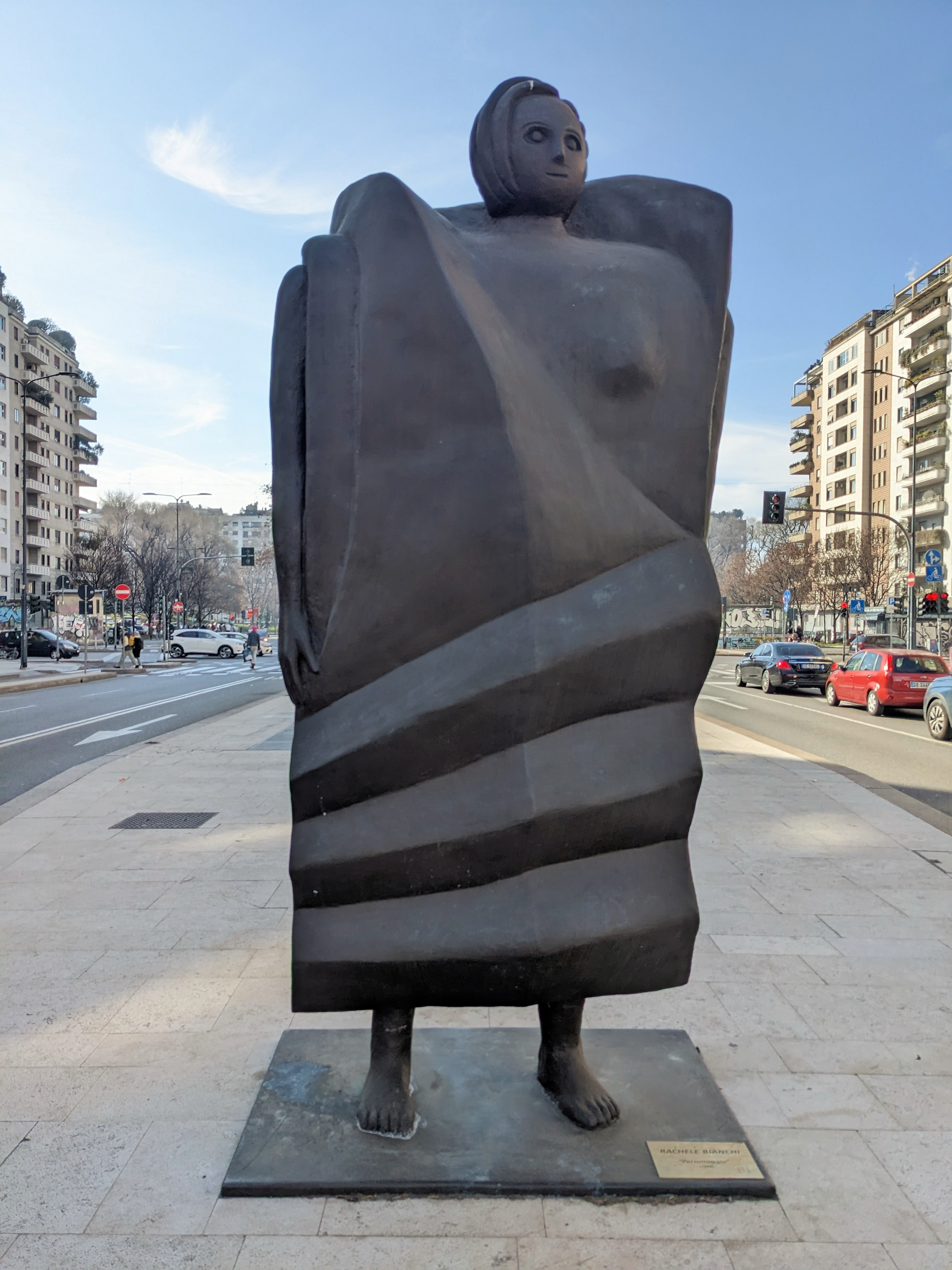
- The sculpture in 2023
- Location: Milan, Italy

Personaggio is a sculpture by Rachele Bianchi, installed in Milan, Italy.
