= Colonna del Leone =

Coordinates: 45°28′01″N 9°11′53″E

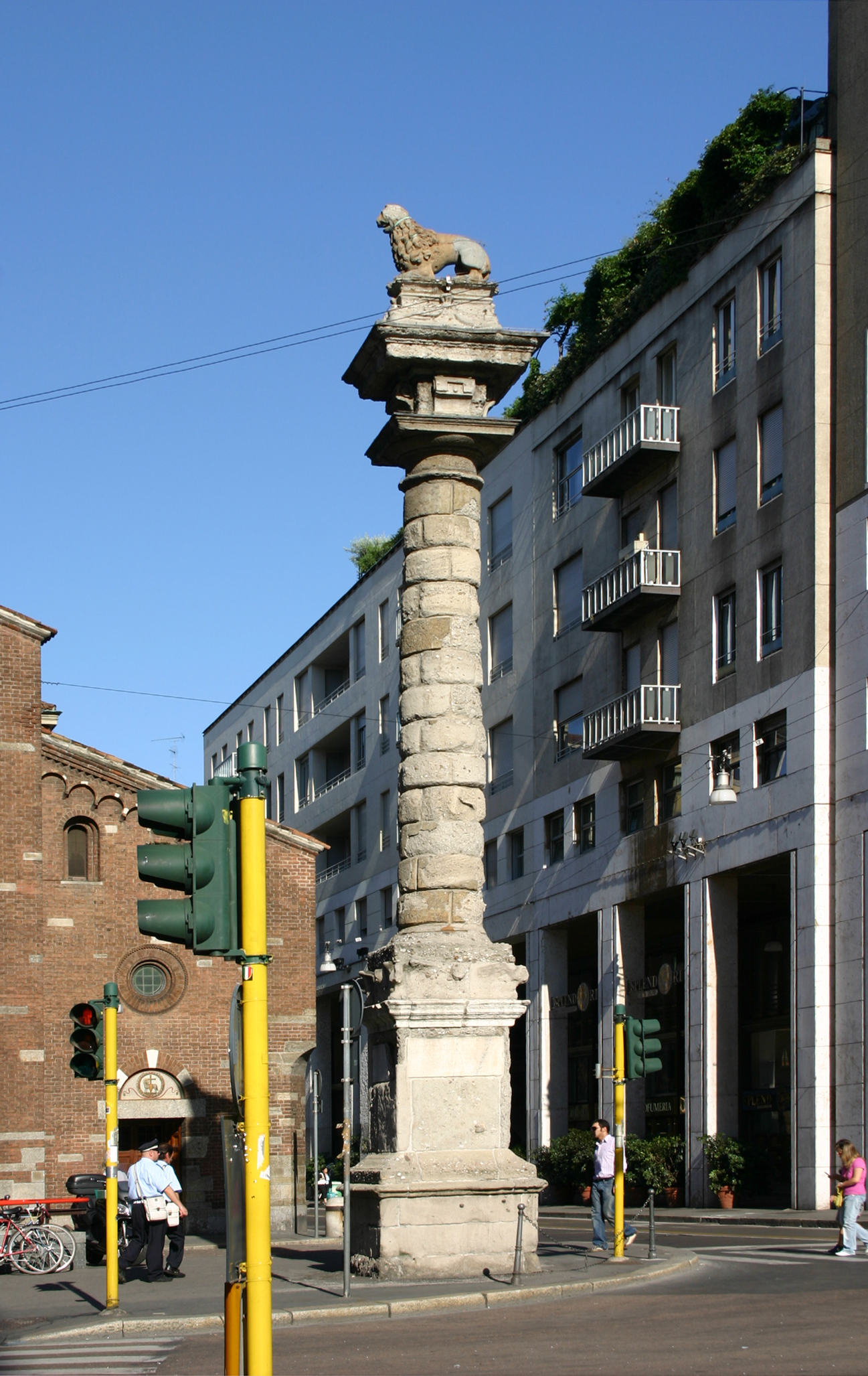
The column in 2007

The Colonna del Leone (English: Column of the Lion) is a stone monument in Piazza San Babila, Milan, Italy.
