= Francesco Barzaghi =

Italian sculptor

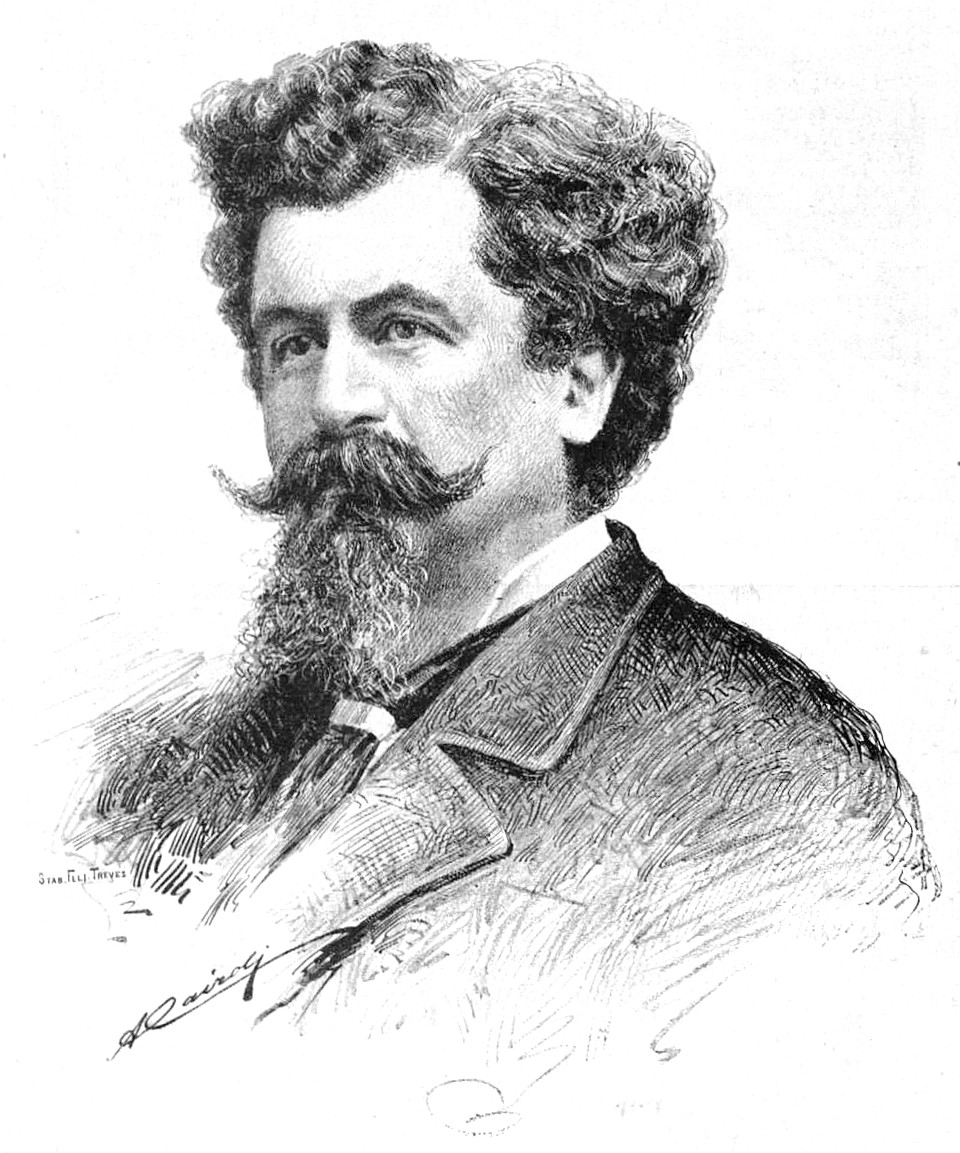
Francesco Barzaghi

Francesco Barzaghi (10 February 1839–21 August 1892) was an Italian sculptor.

== Biography ==
Born in Milan, Austrian Empire, he had his initial training in the studios of Antonio Tantardini and Alessandro Puttinati. He enrolled in the Accademia di Brera. Among his colleagues was Vincenzo Vela. The sculptor Enrico Cassi was one of his pupils.

Barzaghi completed a number of monuments, including the bronze equestrian statued dedicated to Napoleon III, first unveiled in 1881 at the Exposition of Milan. He also made monuments to Luciano Manara and Garibaldi (1888). He made many marble female figures, including:

- La Frine denudata
- La Mosca cieca
- Silvia che si specchia (Paris Exposition 1878)
- Moses saved from the Nile (Paris Exposition 1878)
- L' innocenza (won a prize in Turin 1881)
- Psiche
- La Vanerella
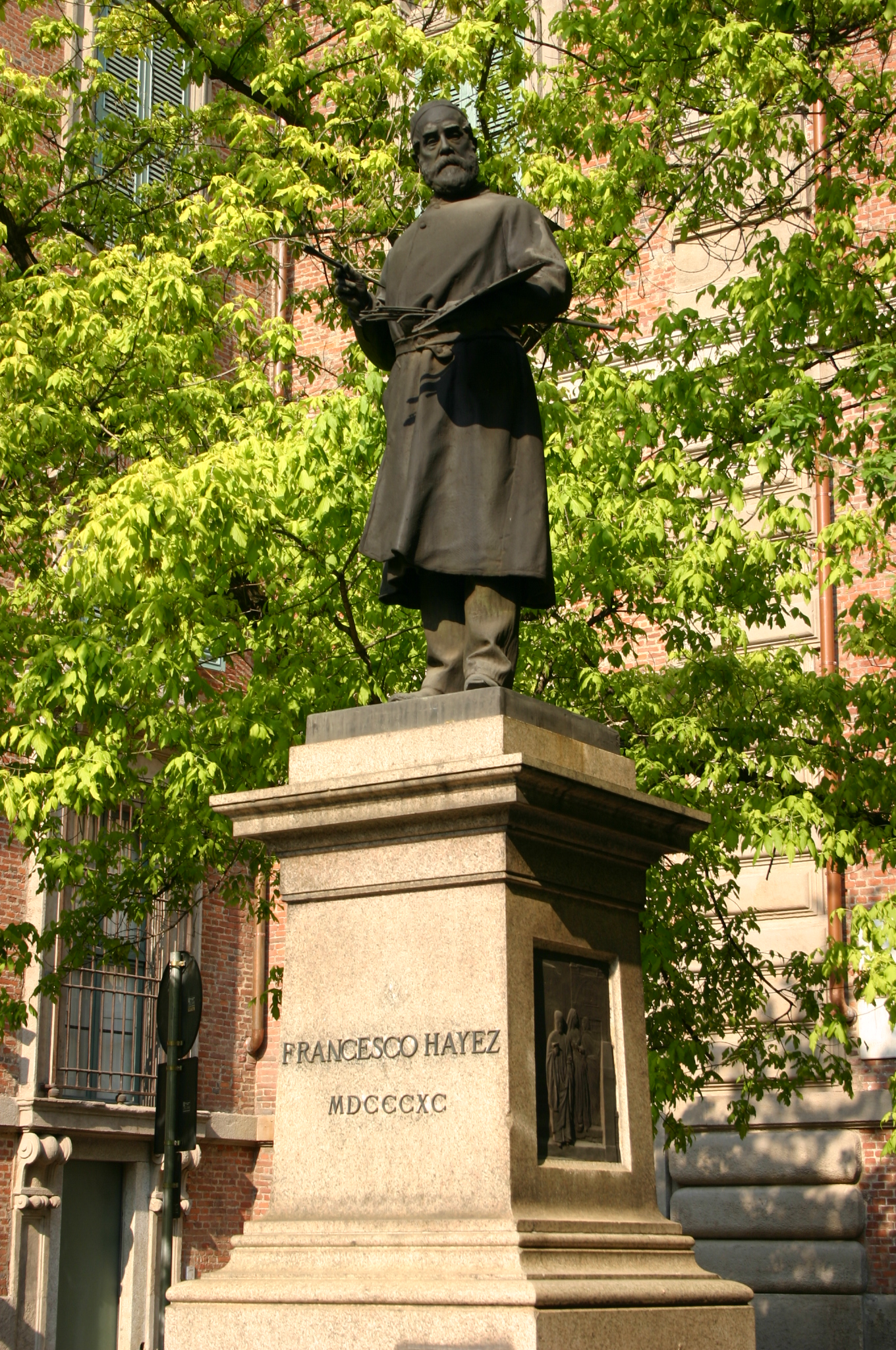
Monument to Francesco Hayez, Milan

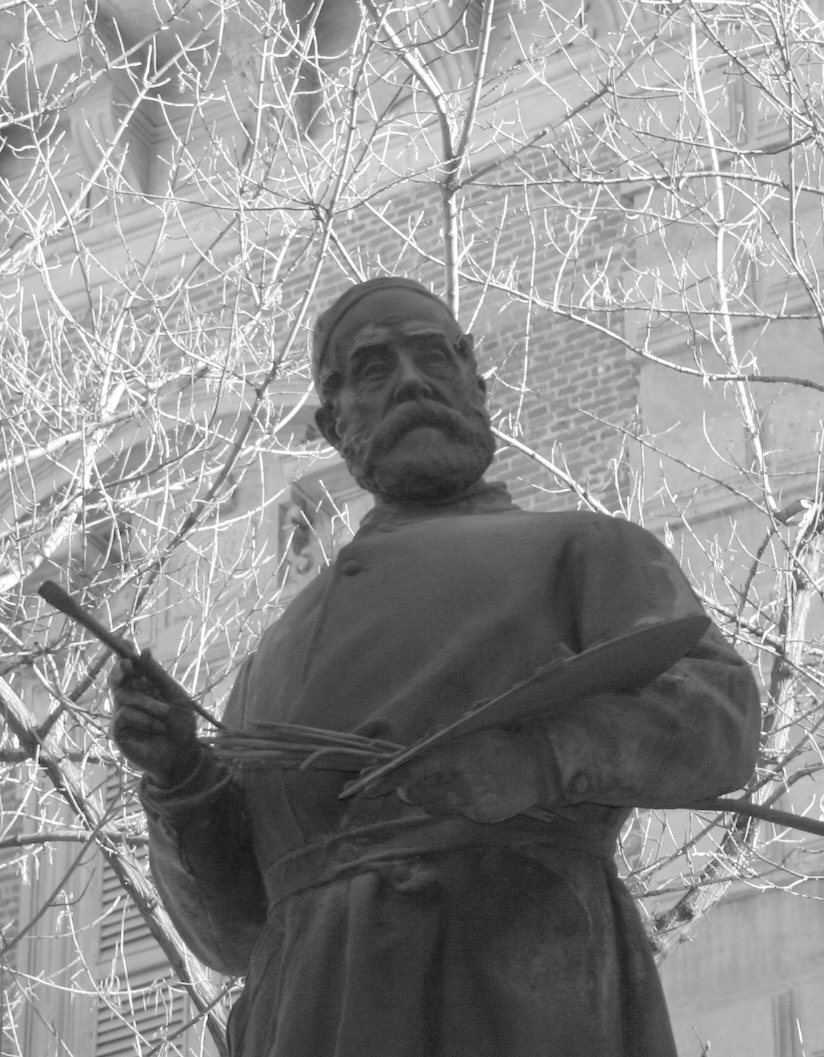
Detail (Hayez Monument)

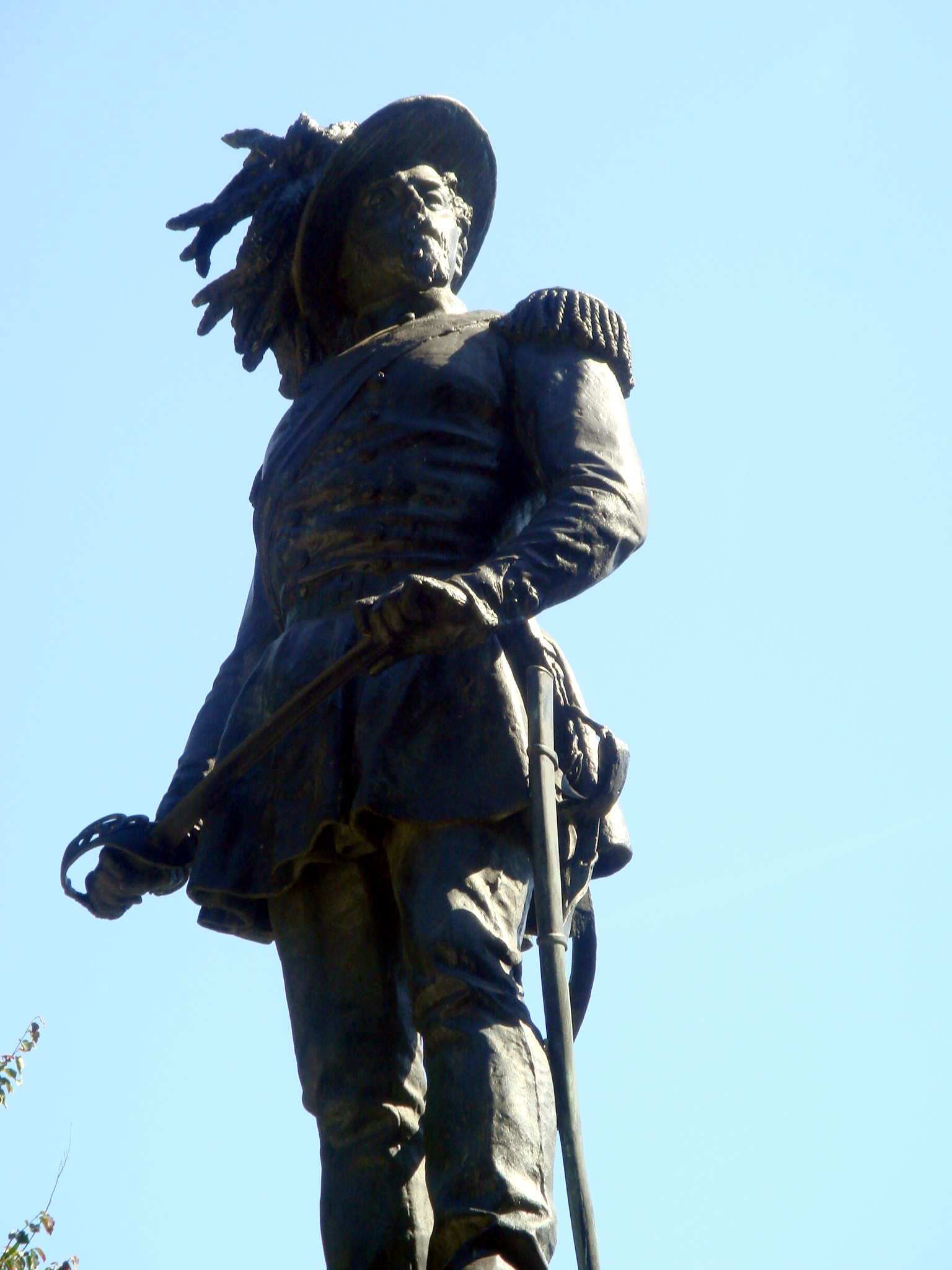
Monument to Luciano Manara (Milan)

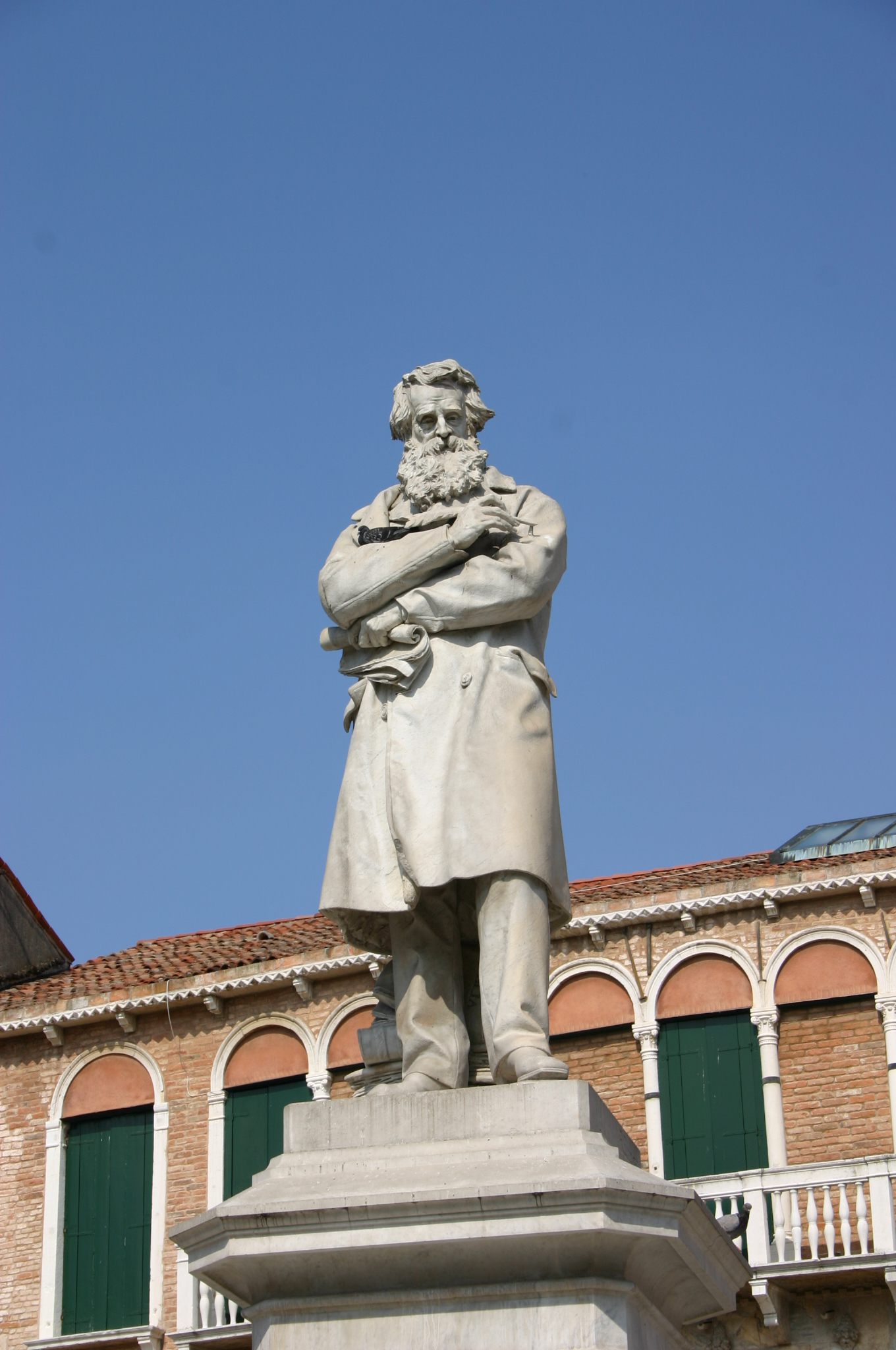
Monument to Niccolò Tommaseo (Venice)

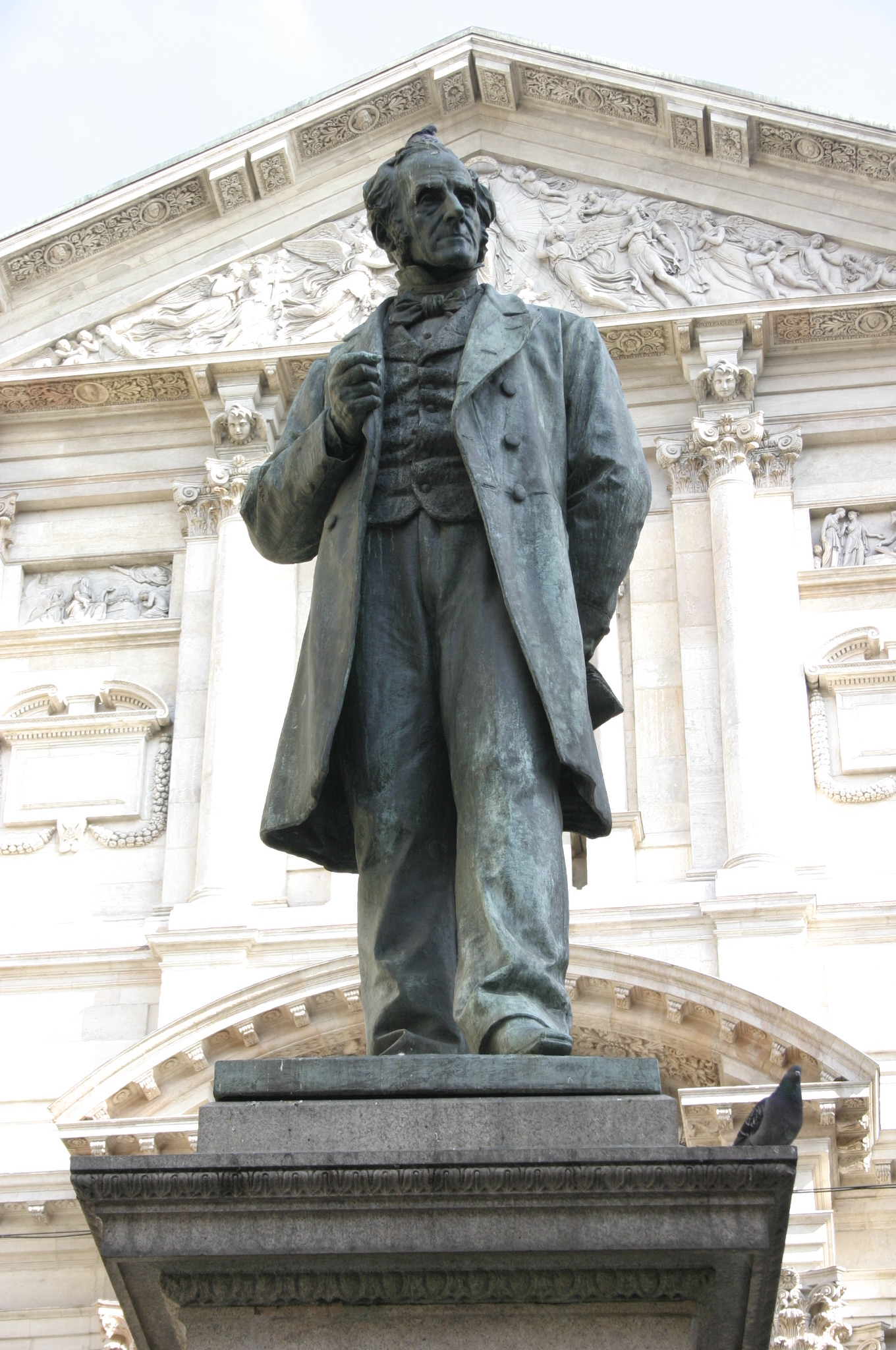
Monument to Alessandro Manzoni in Piazza San Fedele, Milan

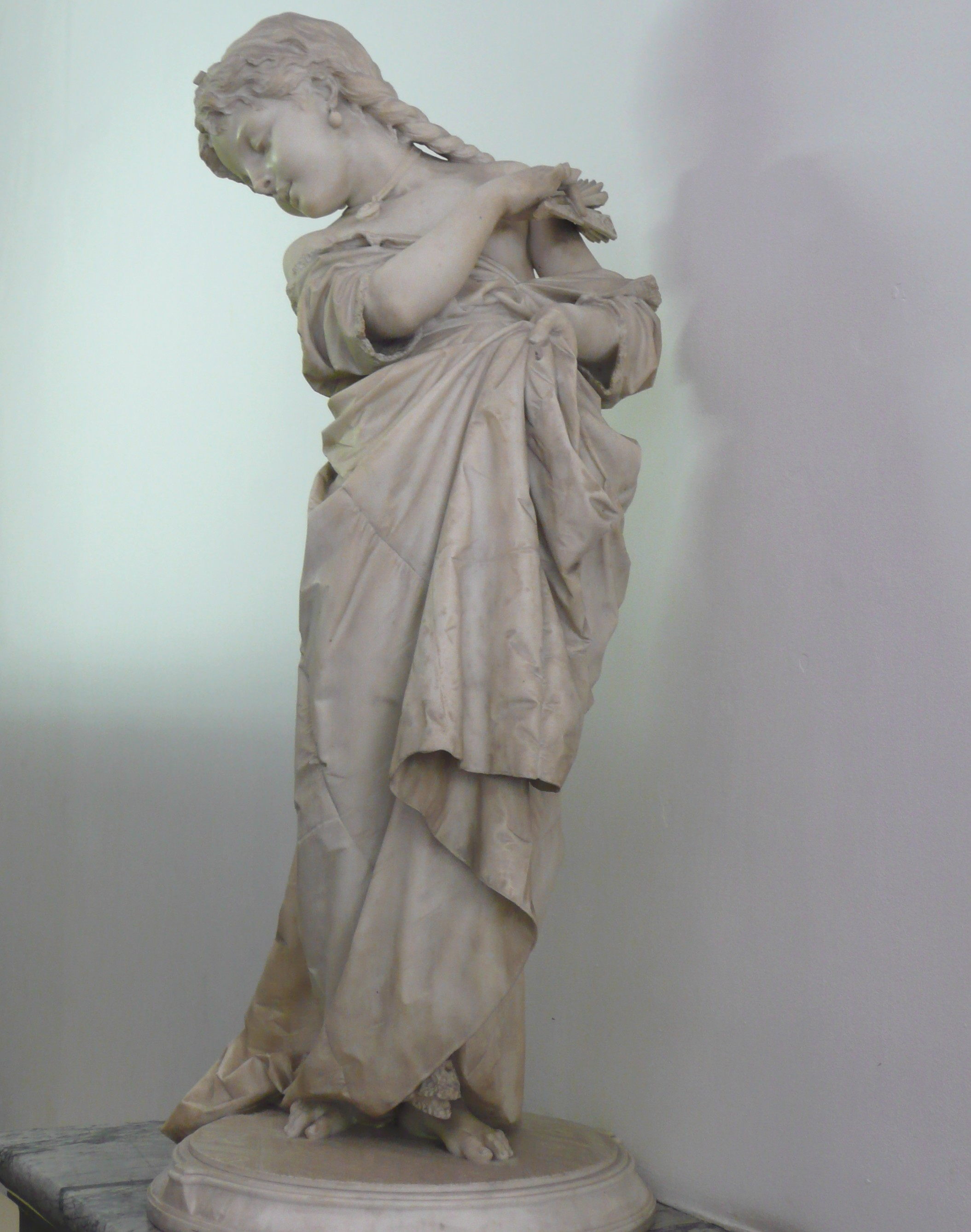
Vanarella, Musée des Beaux-Arts Jules Chéret de Nice (Alpes-Maritimes, France)
