= Equestrian statue of Giuseppe Garibaldi =

Monument in Milan, Italy

- Monumento a Giuseppe Garibaldi
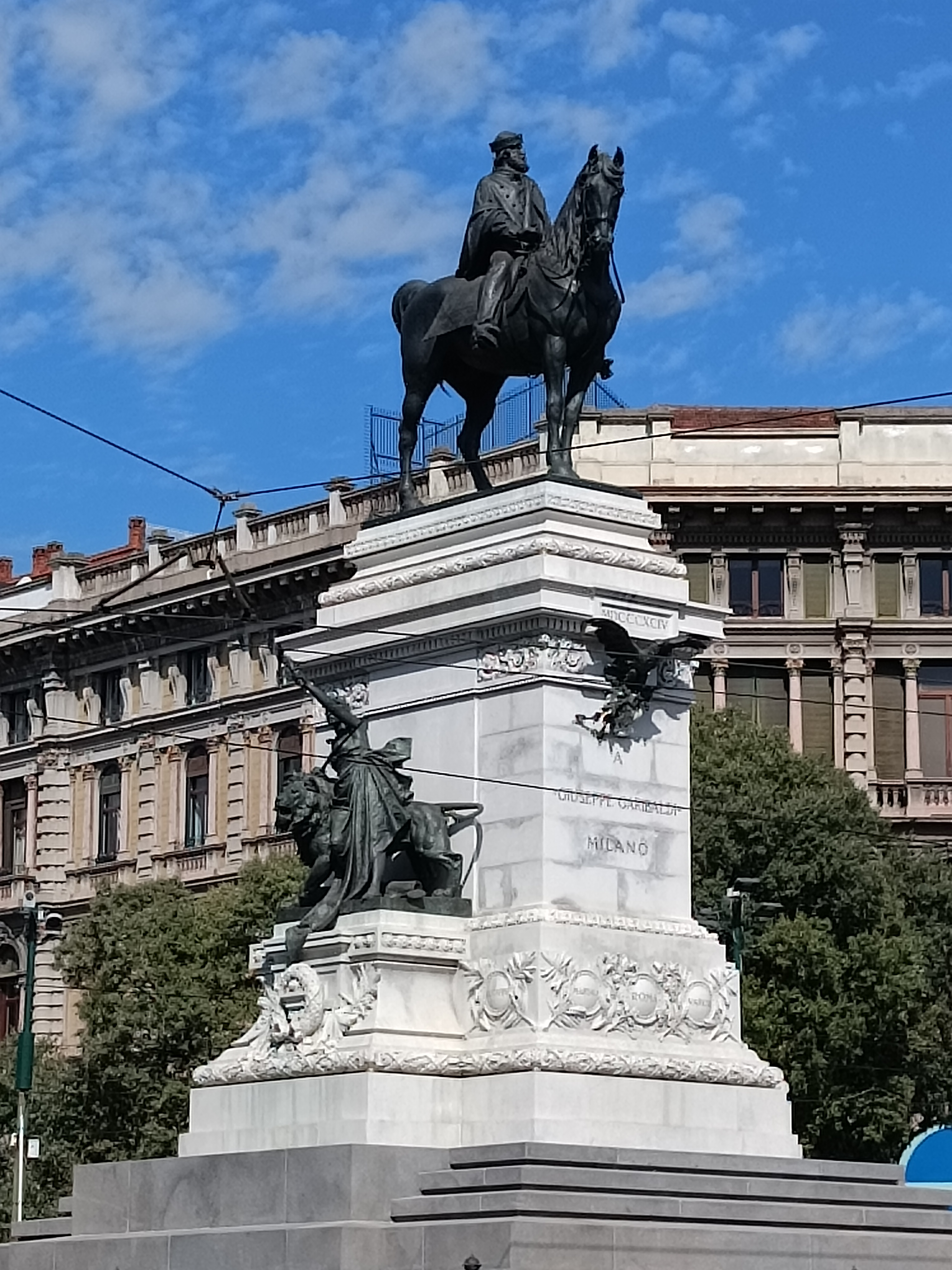
- The monument in Largo Cairoli
- Interactive map of Equestrian statue of Giuseppe Garibaldi
- Location: Largo Cairoli, Milan, Italy
- Coordinates: 45°28′06″N 9°10′56″E
- Designer: Ettore Ximenes
- Type: Equestrian statue
- Material: Bronze and Granite
- Beginning date: 1894
- Completion date: 1895
- Opening date: 3 November 1895
- Dedicated to: Giuseppe Garibaldi

An equestrian statue of Giuseppe Garibaldi by Italian artist Ettore Ximenes is installed in Milan, Italy.
