= Monument to Emilio De Marchi =

Memorial in Milan, Italy

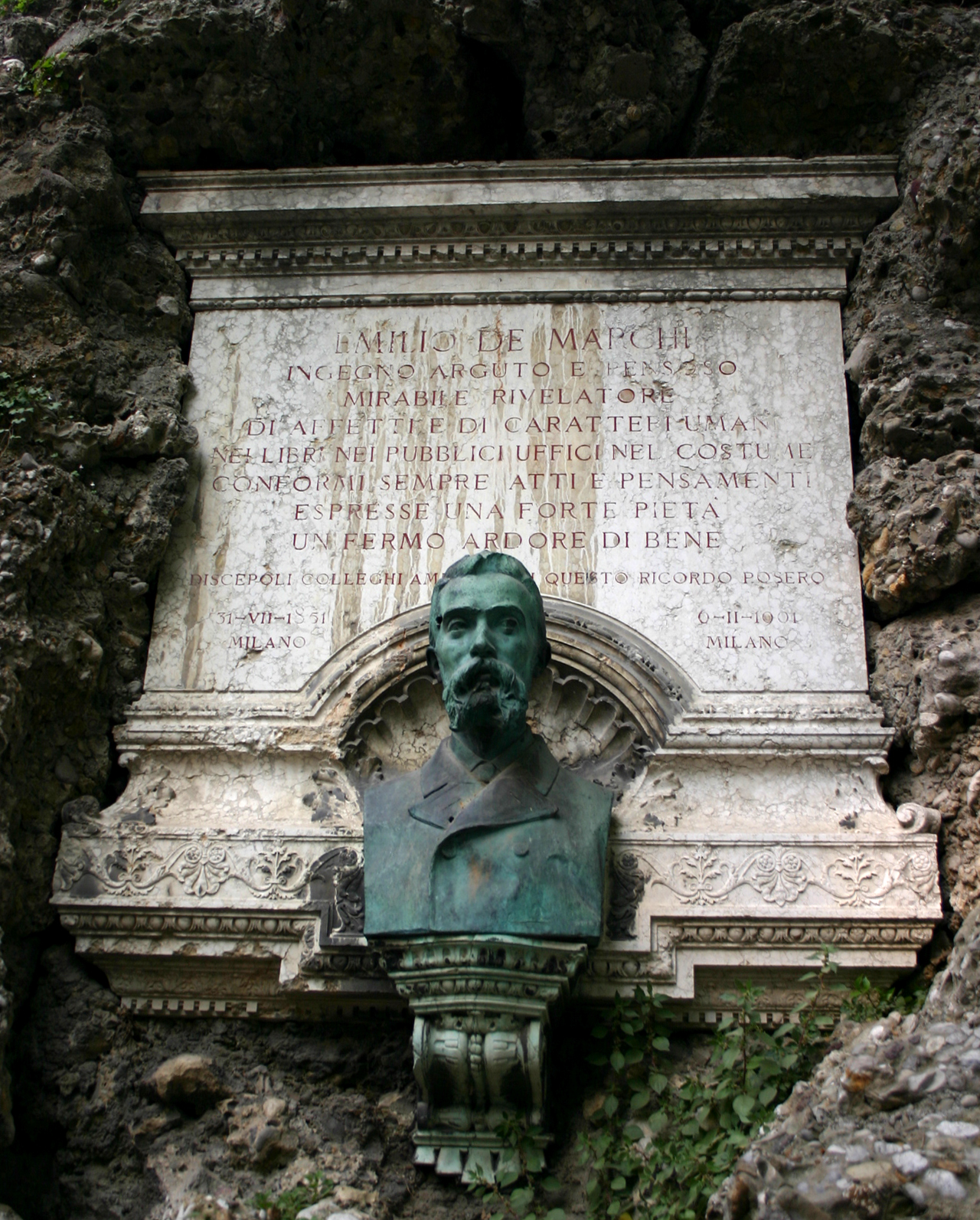
- The monument in 2007
- Interactive map of Monument to Emilio De Marchi
- Location: Giardini Pubblici Indro Montanelli, Milan, Italy
- Designer: Antonio Carminati
- Type: Bust with marble plaque
- Material: Bronze
- Completion date: 1905
- Dedicated to: Emilio De Marchi

A monument to Emilio De Marchi is installed in Milan, Italy.
