= Statue of John of Nepomuk, Milan =

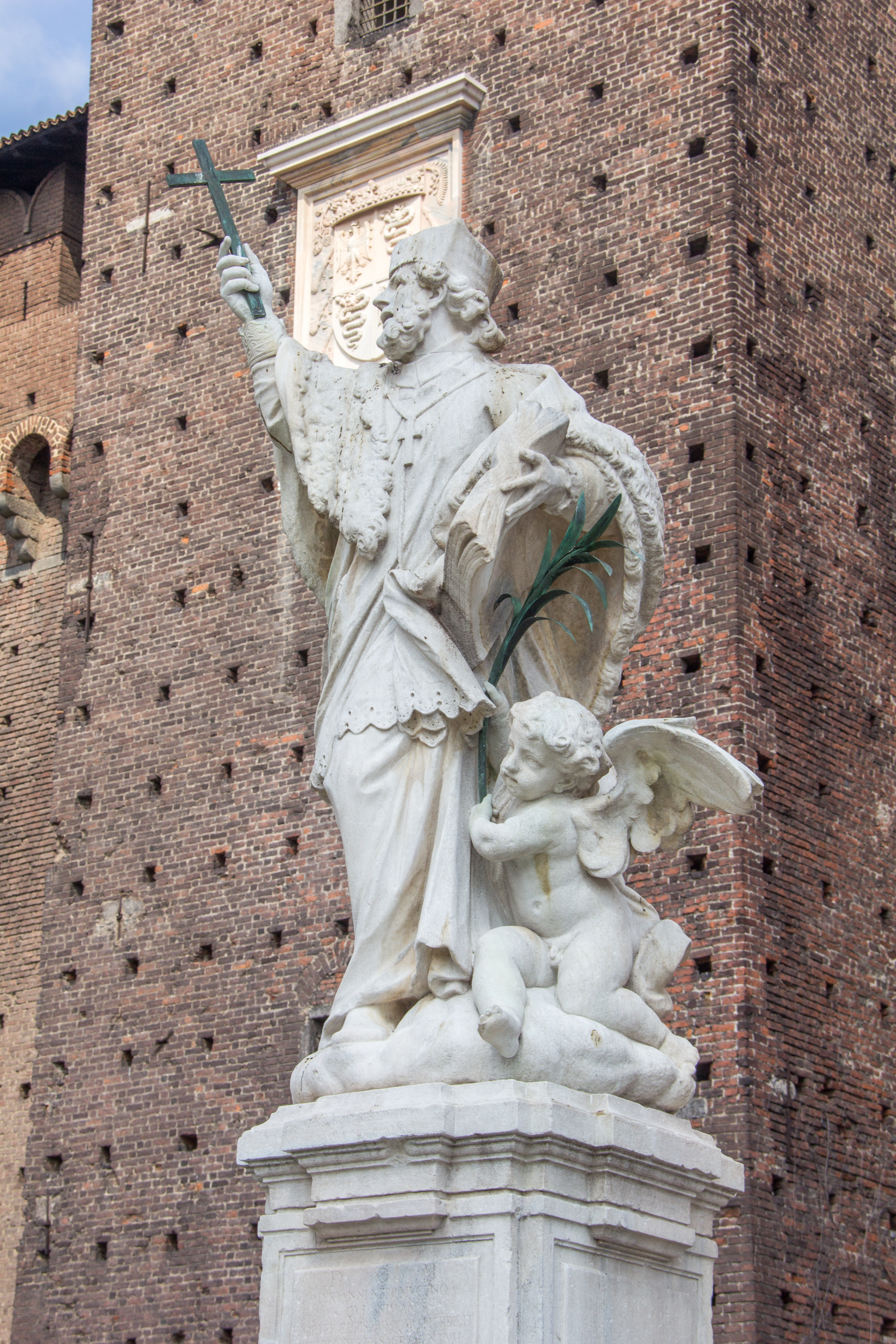
The monument in 2016

A statue of John of Nepomuk is installed in Milan, Italy.
