= Statue of Giulio Ricordi =

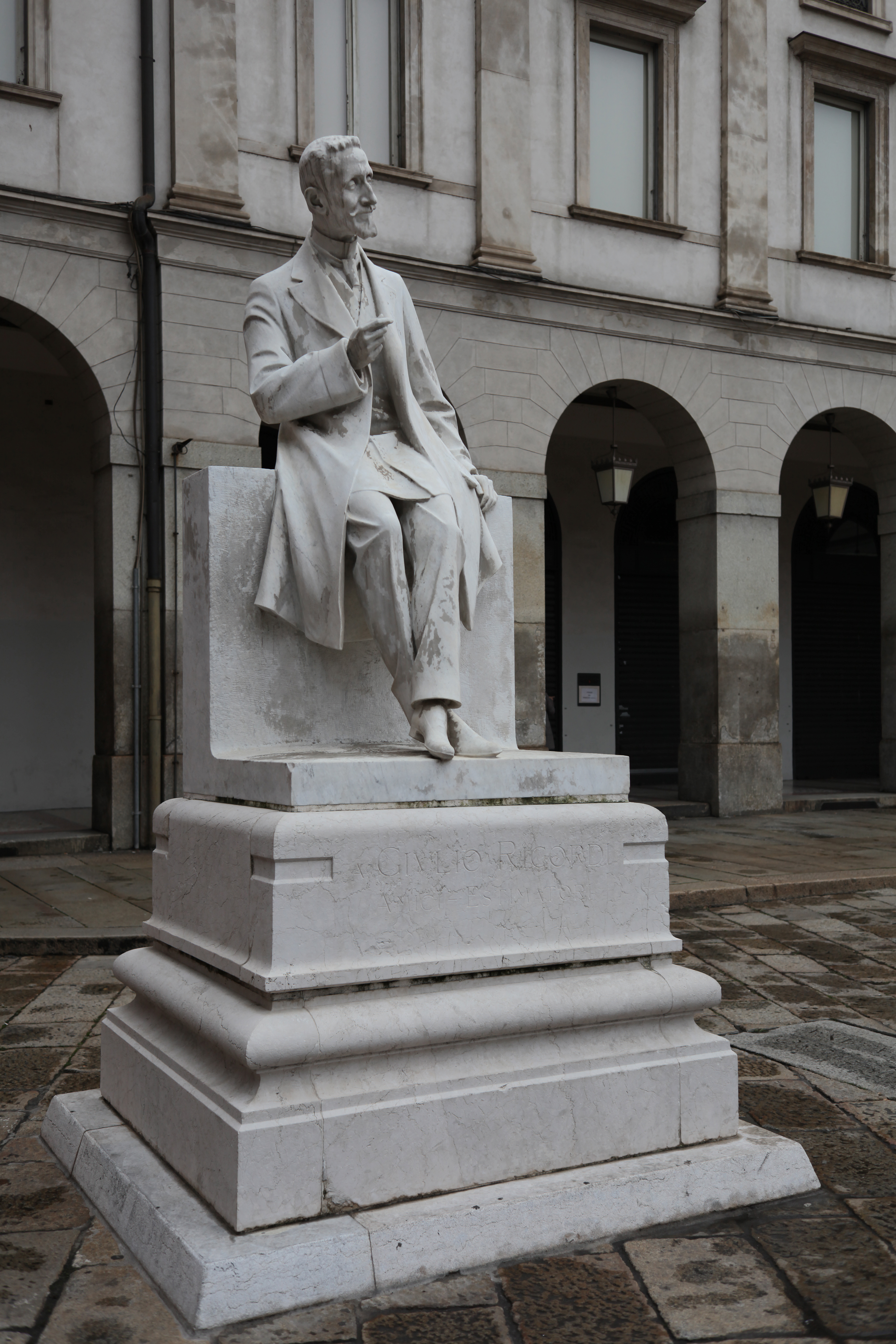
The monument in 2018

A statue of Giulio Ricordi is installed in Milan, Italy.
