= Niccolò Tommaseo =

Dalmatian Italian linguist (1802–1874)

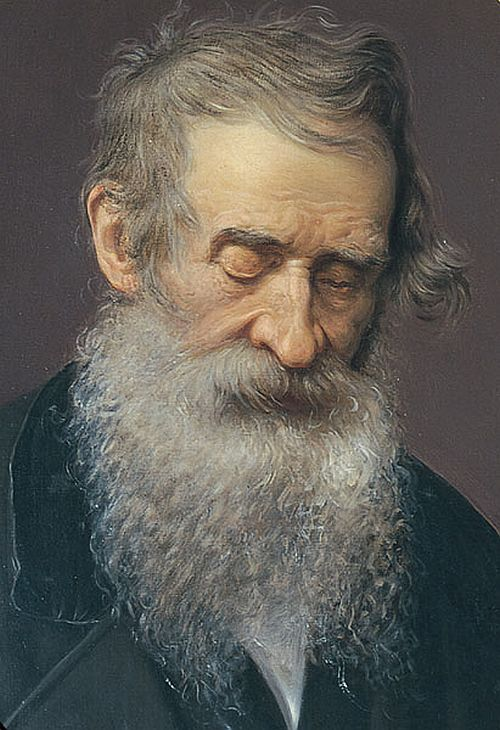
- Portrait of Niccolò Tommaseo by Egisto Sarri
- Born: October 9, 1802; Šibenik, Habsburg Monarchy
- Died: 1 May 1874 (aged 71); Florence, Kingdom of Italy
- Occupations: Linguist, journalist and essayist
- Parent(s): Girolamo Tommaseo and Caterina Tommaseo (née Chevessich)

Academic background
- Education: University of Padua

Academic work
- Discipline: Linguistics
- Notable works: Dizionario della lingua italiana (1861–74)
- Notable ideas: Italian irredentism

Member of the Chamber of Deputies
- In office 2 April 1860 – 17 December 1860
- Constituency: Third Cavour government

Signature
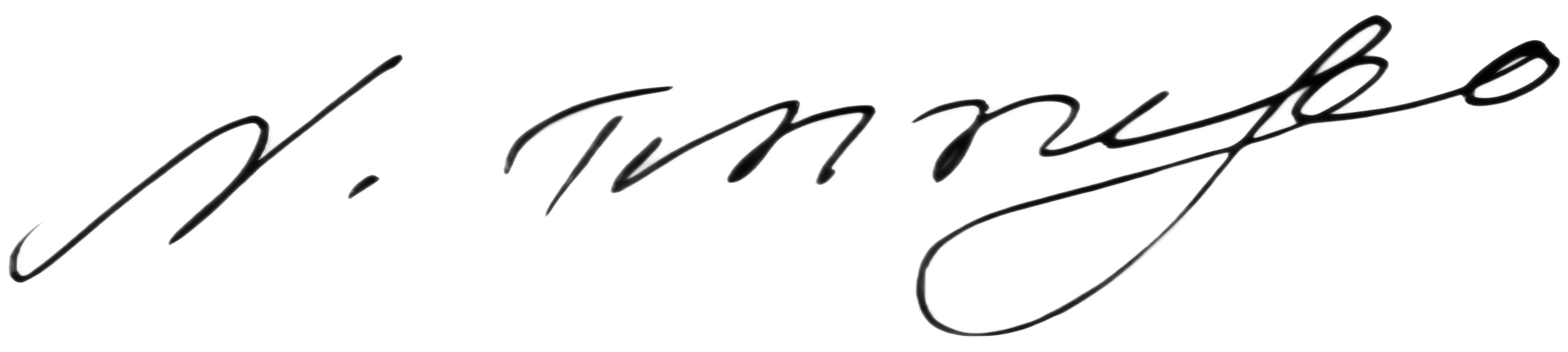

Niccolò Tommaseo (Italian: [nikkoˈlɔ ttommaˈzɛːo]; 9 October 1802 – 1 May 1874) was a Dalmatian Italian linguist, journalist and essayist, the editor of a Dizionario della Lingua Italiana (A Dictionary of the Italian Language) in eight volumes (1861–74), of a dictionary of synonyms (1830) and other works. He is considered a precursor of the Italian irredentism.

== Biography ==
Born at Sebenico (Šibenik), which was in quick succession under Venetian, Napoleonic and Habsburg domain, Tommaseo was culturally and ethnically Italian, but expressed also a genuine interest in the Illyrian popular culture. His education, pursued at Spalato (Split), was a humanistic one with a sound Catholic basis.

He moved to Italy to graduate in law at the University of Padua in 1822. He then spent several years as a journalist roving between Padua and Milan, where he came in contact with Alessandro Manzoni and Antonio Rosmini-Serbati. In this period of life, he began his collaboration in the Antologia of Giovan Pietro Vieusseux, founder of the Gabinetto Vieusseux, the reading room and intellectual centre in Florence. He also corresponded with Petar II Petrović Njegoš of Montenegro and Medo Pucić. Nikola Tomazeo (Niccolò Tommaseo) is regarded as part of both the Italian and Serbian literary corpus according to critic Jovan Skerlić who included him in his Istorja nove srpske književnosti (1914).

A friend of Antonio Rosmini, of Vincenzo Monti and of Alessandro Manzoni, in 1825 he met in Florence in the Gabinetto Vieusseux Giacomo Leopardi, but their friendship deteriorated after a short time. In the novel Faith and Beauty (Fede e bellezza, 1840) he describes his love relationship in an oscillation between moralism and eroticism which pushed Manzoni to accuse him of being a public Catholic sinner.

Having moved to Florence in the autumn of 1827, he became a friend of Gino Capponi and soon became one of the important voices in the Antologia. In 1830 appeared the Nuovo Dizionario de' Sinonimi della lingua italiana which confirmed his public reputation. Following the protests of the Austrian government against an article defending the Greek revolution that resulted in the closure of the journal in which he was publishing, he sought voluntary exile in Paris.

During his years in Paris he published the political work Dell'Italia (1835), the volume of verses, Confessioni (1836), the historical fiction Il Duca di Atene (1837), a commentary on the Divine Comedy (1837), and his Memorie Poetiche (1838).

From Paris, he moved to Corsica, where with the support and collaboration of the magistrate and essayist of Bastia, Salvatore Viale, he worked to compile the copious Italian oral traditions of the island, where he claimed to find the purest Italian dialect in the book Canti populari: Canti Corsi.

In Venice he published the first two installments of his novel Fede e Bellezza, praised today as an early example of the psychological novel. His anthology of popular songs, Canti popolari italiani, corsi, illirici, greci (1841) and the Scintille/Iskrice (1842) are rare examples of a metropolitan culture above nationalism.

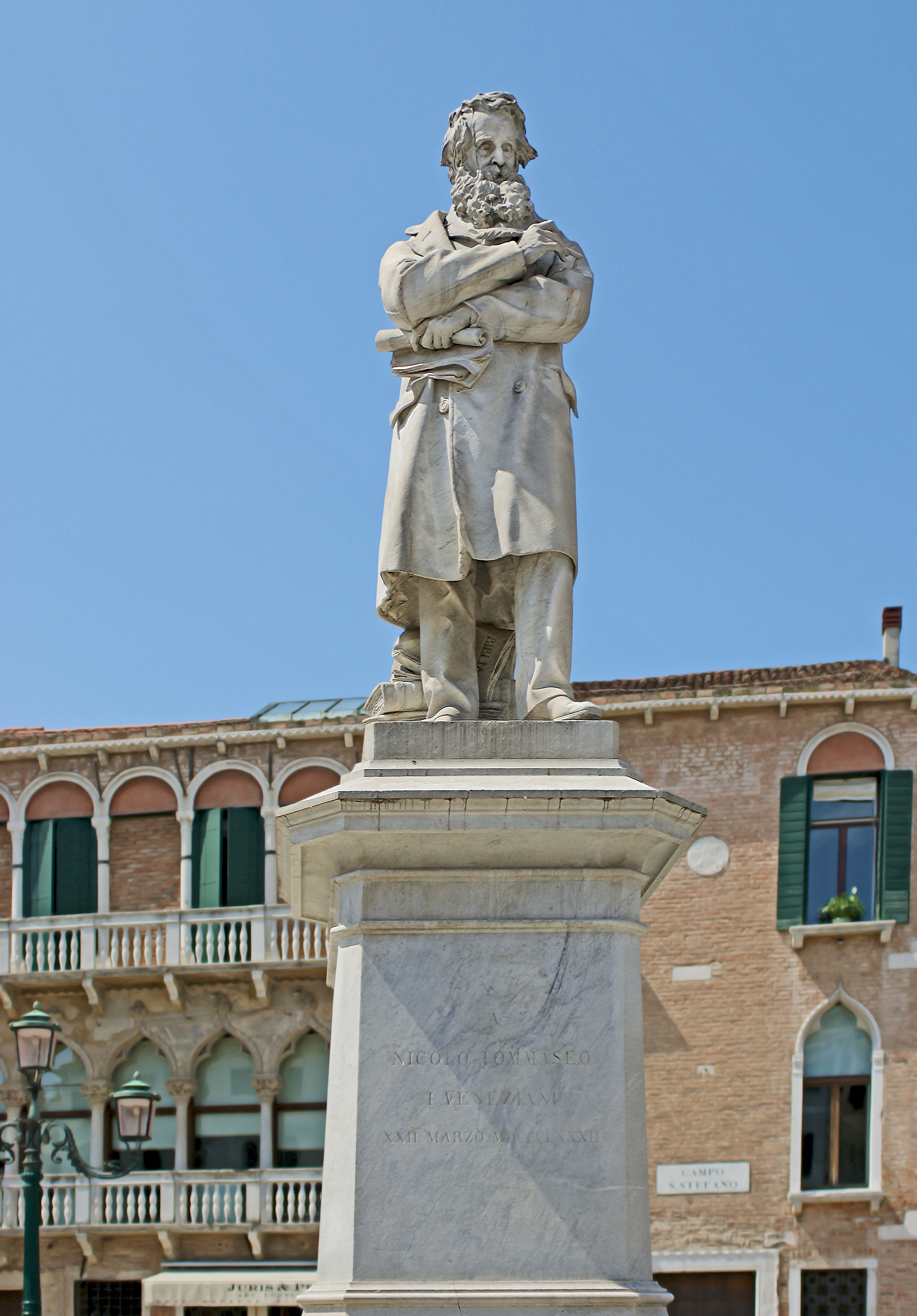
Statue in Venice

In 1847, he returned to the journalistic forum, and as an outspoken defender of liberalizing laws for a wholly free press was arrested, causing a scandal: he was freed during the liberal revolution headed by Daniele Manin and assumed responsibilities in the briefly renewed Venetian Republic, which cost him an exile (because accused of Italian irredentist) in Corfù when Habsburg control was reasserted over Lombardy-Venetia. In Corfù, with his eyesight failing, he nevertheless managed to write numerous essays, among which, in Rome et le monde (written in French), he declared, as a good Catholic, the necessity of the Church's relinquishing temporal power in the Papal States. During this time, he abandoned his hopes for the "moderate" road to the Unification of Italy through the House of Savoy.

In 1854, with his sight ever more compromised, he moved to Turin (1854), then once again to Florence (1859), where he took a villa at Settignano. His opposition to the House of Savoy made him refuse all honours, including a seat in the Senate. In his final years he devoted himself to the weighty dictionary of the Italian language, in seven volumes, which was completed in 1874, after his death.

== Main works ==
- Nuovo Dizionario de' Sinonimi della lingua italiana. Florence: Luigi Pezzati. 1830.
- Dizionario di sinonimi della lingua italiana. 2 vols. Florence: Gio. Pietro Vieusseux. 1838.
- Canti popolari italiani, corsi, illirici, greci. 4 vols. Venice: Girolamo Tasso. 1841–1842.
- Tommaseo, Niccolò (1847). Vita di S. Giuseppe Calasanzio. Rome.
- Niccolò Tommaseo, ed. (1849). Scritti di Gasparo Gozzi. 3 vols. Florence: Le Monnier.
- Tommasèo, Niccolò (1855). "Sopra gli studi storici e le pubblicazioni dei monumenti che debbono sussidiarli, considerazioni". Archivio Storico Italiano. 1 (1): 95–111. JSTOR 44452260.
- Niccolò Tommaseo, ed. (1860). Le lettere di Santa Caterina di Siena. 4 vols. Florence: Gaspero Barbera.
- La questione dalmatica riguardata ne' suoi nuovi aspetti: osservazioni. Zadar: Fratelli Battara. 1861.
- Il secondo esilio. 3 vols. Milan: Francesco Sanvito. 1862.
- Sulla pena di morte. Florence: Le Monnier. 1865.
- Nuovi studj su Dante. Turin: tip. del Collegio degli Artigianelli. 1865.
- Il serio nel faceto: scitti varii. Florence: Le Monnier. 1868.
- Dizionario estetico. Florence: Le Monnier. 1872.
- Memorie poetiche. Scrittori d'Italia Laterza. Bari: Laterza. 1964. Archived from the original on 6 February 2007.

== Bibliography ==
- Bernardi, Jacopo (1874). Vita e scritti di Niccolò Tommaseo. Turin: UTET.
- Bronzini, Giovanni Battista (1974). "La poesia popolare nella critica del Tommaseo degli anni 1830-32". Lares: Quadrimestrale di studi demoetnoantropologici. 40 (1): 5–42. JSTOR 44629666.
- Cesaretti, Enrico (2004). "The Language of Passion: Gesture and Melodrama in Niccolò Tommaseo's Fede e bellezza". Modern Language Notes. 119 (1): 52–66. JSTOR 3251722.
- Kirchner Reill, Dominique (2012). "Niccolò Tommaseo: Progress Through Multi-Nationalism". Nationalists Who Feared the Nation: Adriatic Multi-Nationalism in Habsburg Dalmatia, Trieste, and Venice. Stanford, CA: Stanford University Press. pp. 47–80. doi:10.2307/j.ctvqsdtbr.8. ISBN 978-0-8047-7446-8. JSTOR j.ctvqsdtbr.8.
- "O životu i književnom radu Nikole Tommasea". Iskrice [On the Life and Literary Work of Nikola Tommaseo] (in Serbo-Croatian) (4th ed.). Zagreb: Matica hrvatska. 1888. pp. VII–LXXVIII.
