= List of public art in Venice =

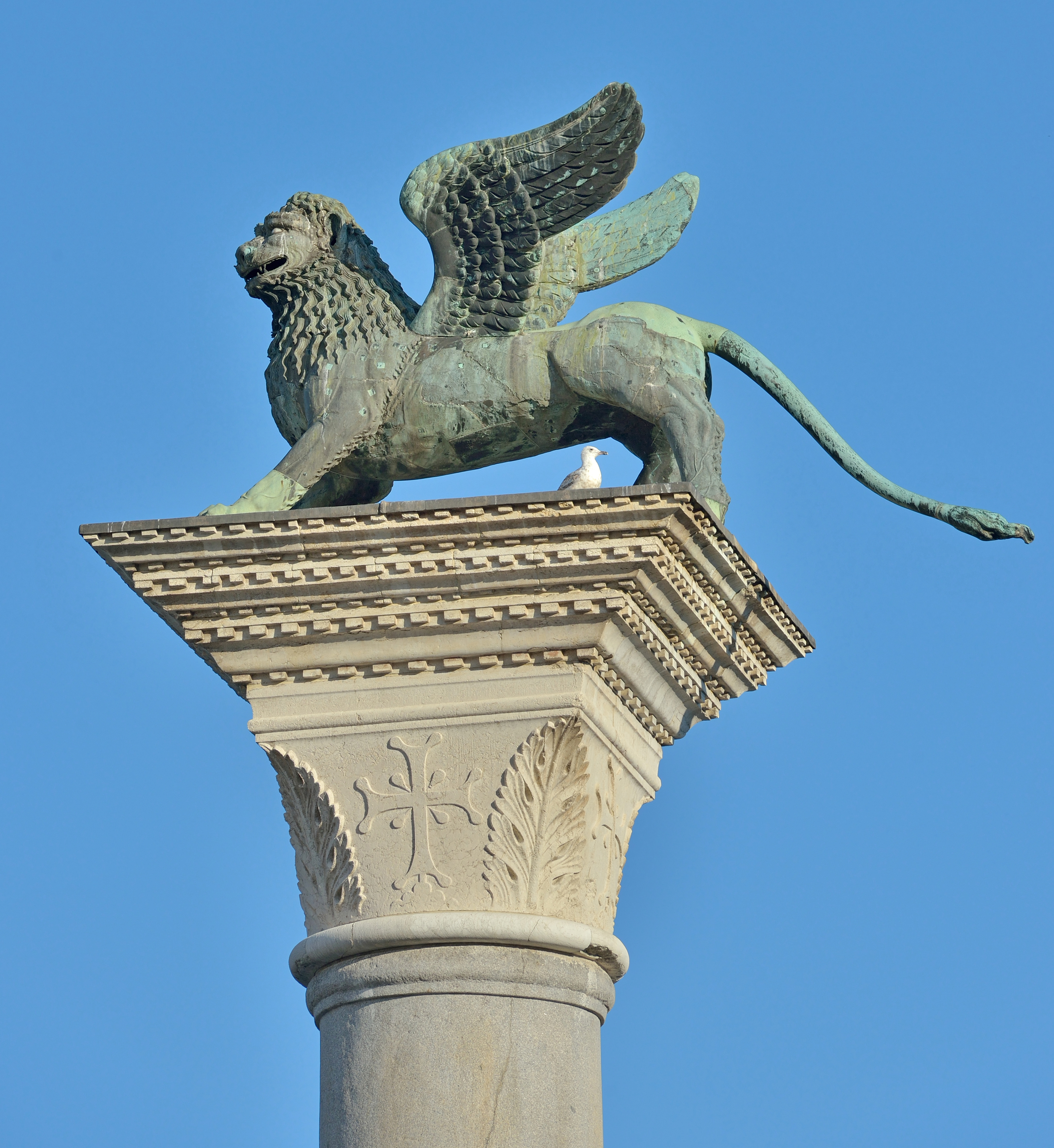
Lion of Venice

Following is a list of notable public artworks in Venice, Italy:

- Columns of San Marco and San Todaro
- Equestrian statue of Bartolomeo Colleoni
- Il Gobbo di Rialto
- Lion of Venice
- Monument to Victor Emmanuel II
- Piraeus Lion
- Statue of Carlo Goldoni
- Statue of Daniele Manin
- Statue of Niccolò Tommaseo
- Statue of Paolo Sarpi
- Statue of Pietro Paleocapa

== See also ==
- List of public art in Milan
- List of public art in Rome
- Lists of public art
