= San Giacomo di Rialto =

Church in the sestiere of San Polo, Venice, Italy

Coordinates: 45°26′18.5″N 12°20′7.7″E

Church of San Giacomo di Rialto
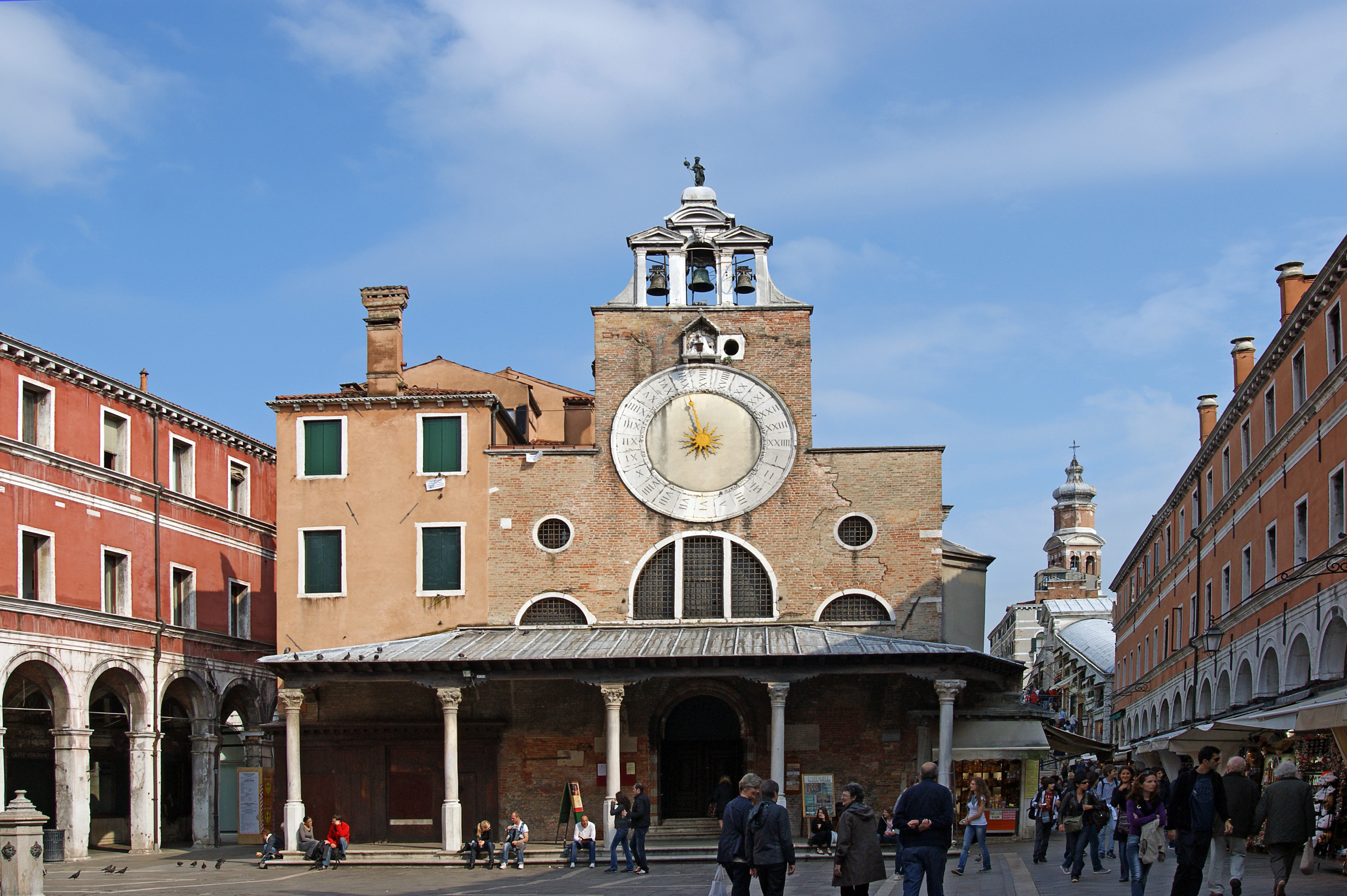

- Location within Venice Location within Italy

Religion
- Affiliation: Roman Catholic
- Province: Venice

Location
- Location: Venice, Italy

Architecture
- Type: Church

San Giacomo di Rialto is a church in the sestiere of San Polo, Venice, northern Italy. The inclusion of Rialto in the name distinguishes this church from San Giacomo dell'Orio which is situated in the sestiere of Santa Croce, on the same side of the Grand Canal. The church's front forms the eastern side of Rialto Square and is one of the only buildings on that square that escaped the devastating fire of 1514 alongside the Palazzo dei Camerlenghi

It has a large 15th-century clock above the entrance, a useful item in the Venetian business district but regarded as a standing joke for its inaccuracy. The Gothic portico is one of the few surviving examples in Venice. It has a Latin cross plan with a central dome. Inside, the Veneto-Byzantine capitals on the six columns of ancient Greek marble date from the 11th century.

== History ==
According to tradition, San Giacomo is the oldest church in the city, supposedly consecrated in the year 421. Although documents exist mentioning the area but not the church in 1097, the first document citing the church dates from 1152. It was rebuilt in 1071, prompting the establishment of the Rialto market with bankers and money changers in front of the church. The system with the "bill of exchange" was introduced here, as clients went with such a bill of exchange with a credit inscribed from one banker to another.

In 1503, it survived a fire which destroyed the rest of the area, and was restored from 1601 by order of Doge Marino Grimani. Works included raising of the pavement to counter the acqua alta.

== Gallery ==
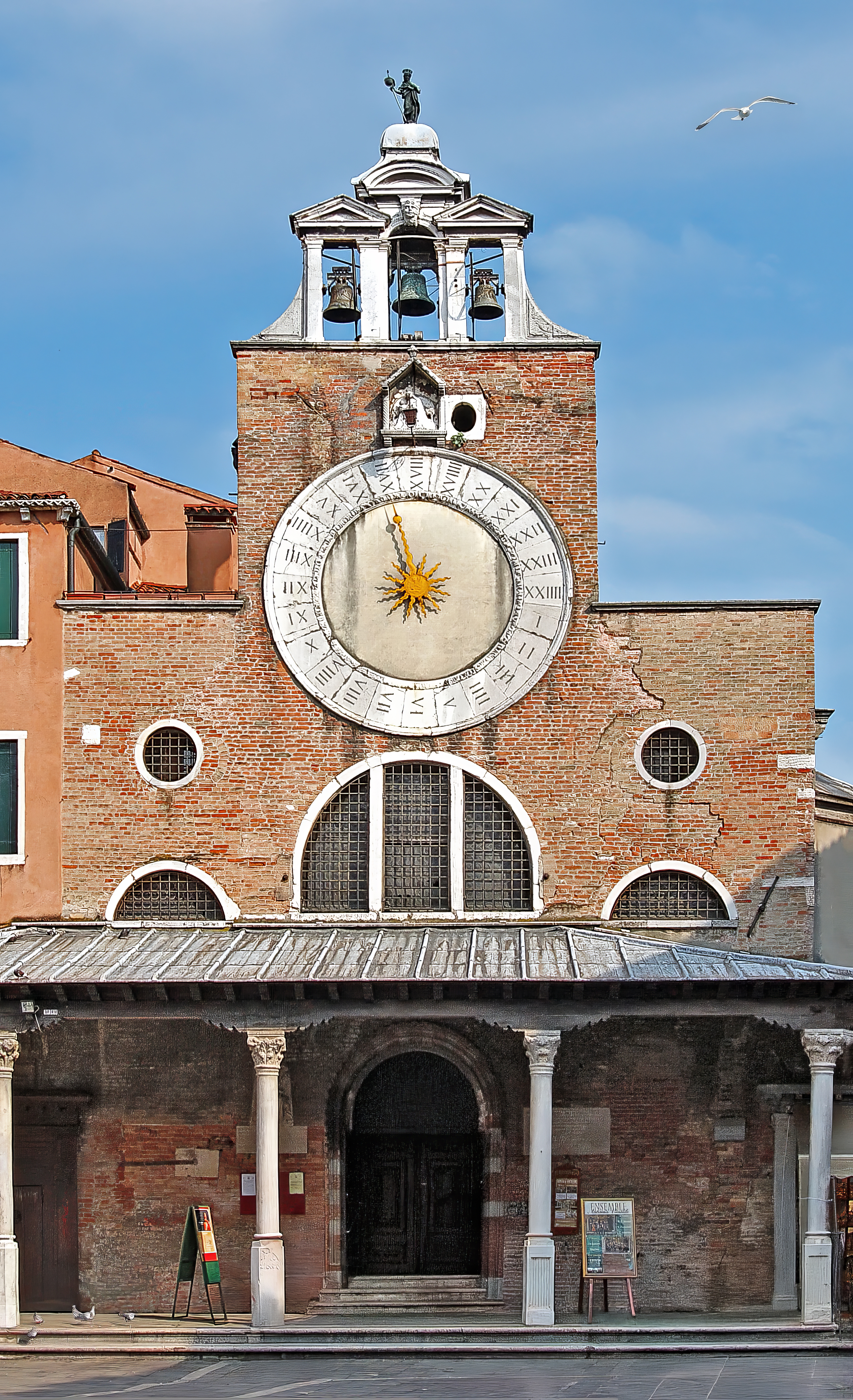
Clock with one hand, divided into 24 hours.

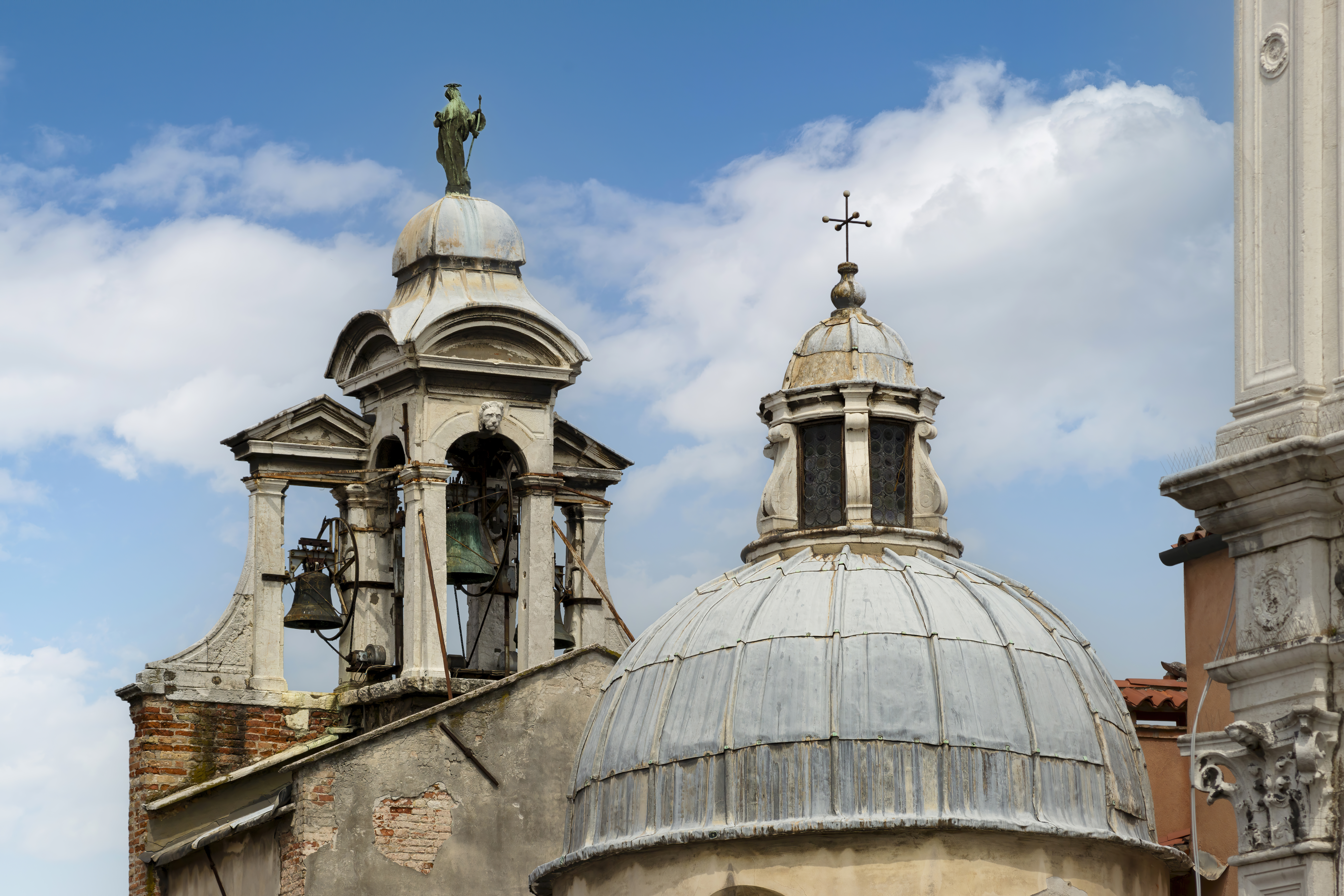
The bell tower and the dome

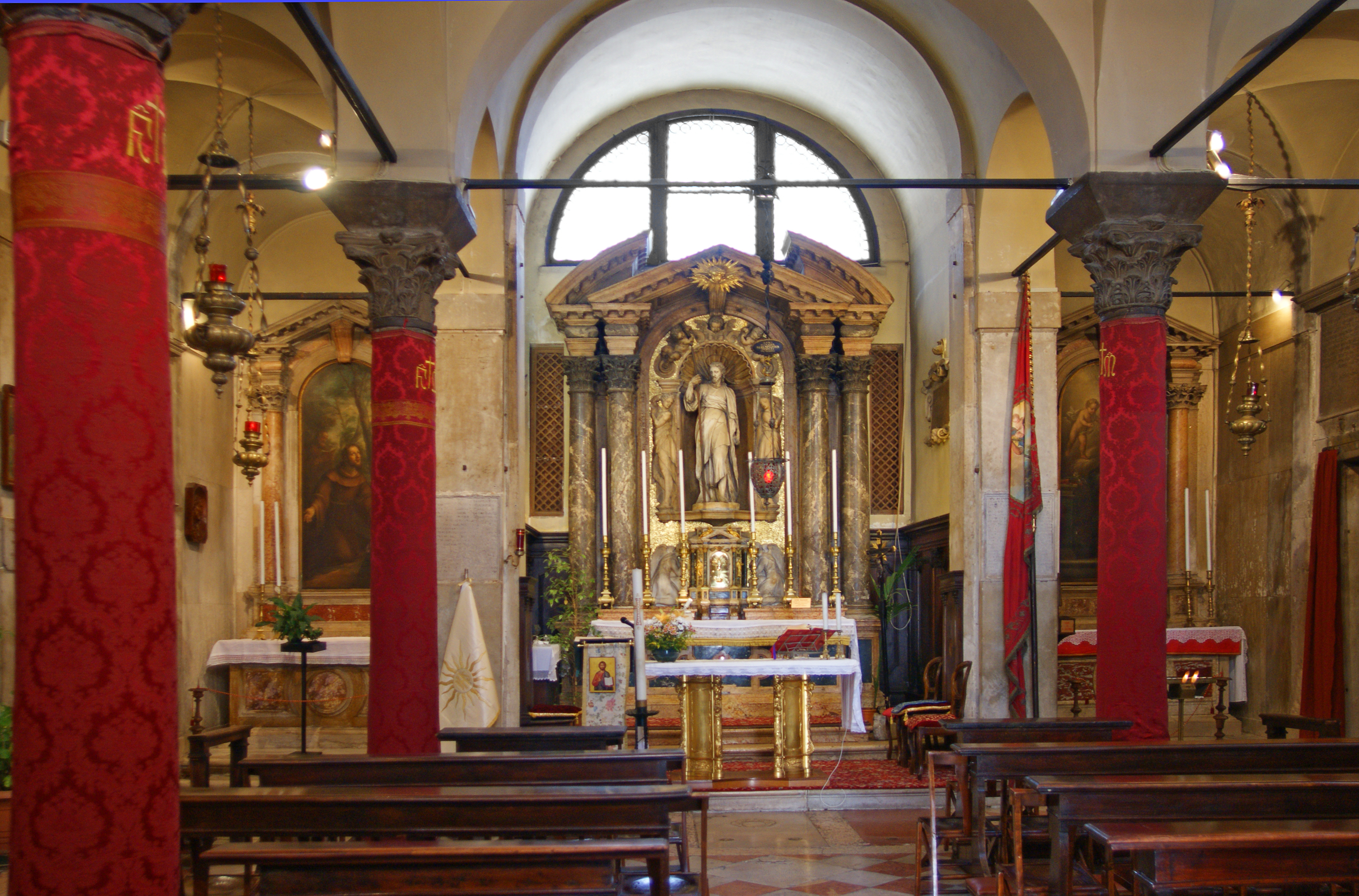
Interior view

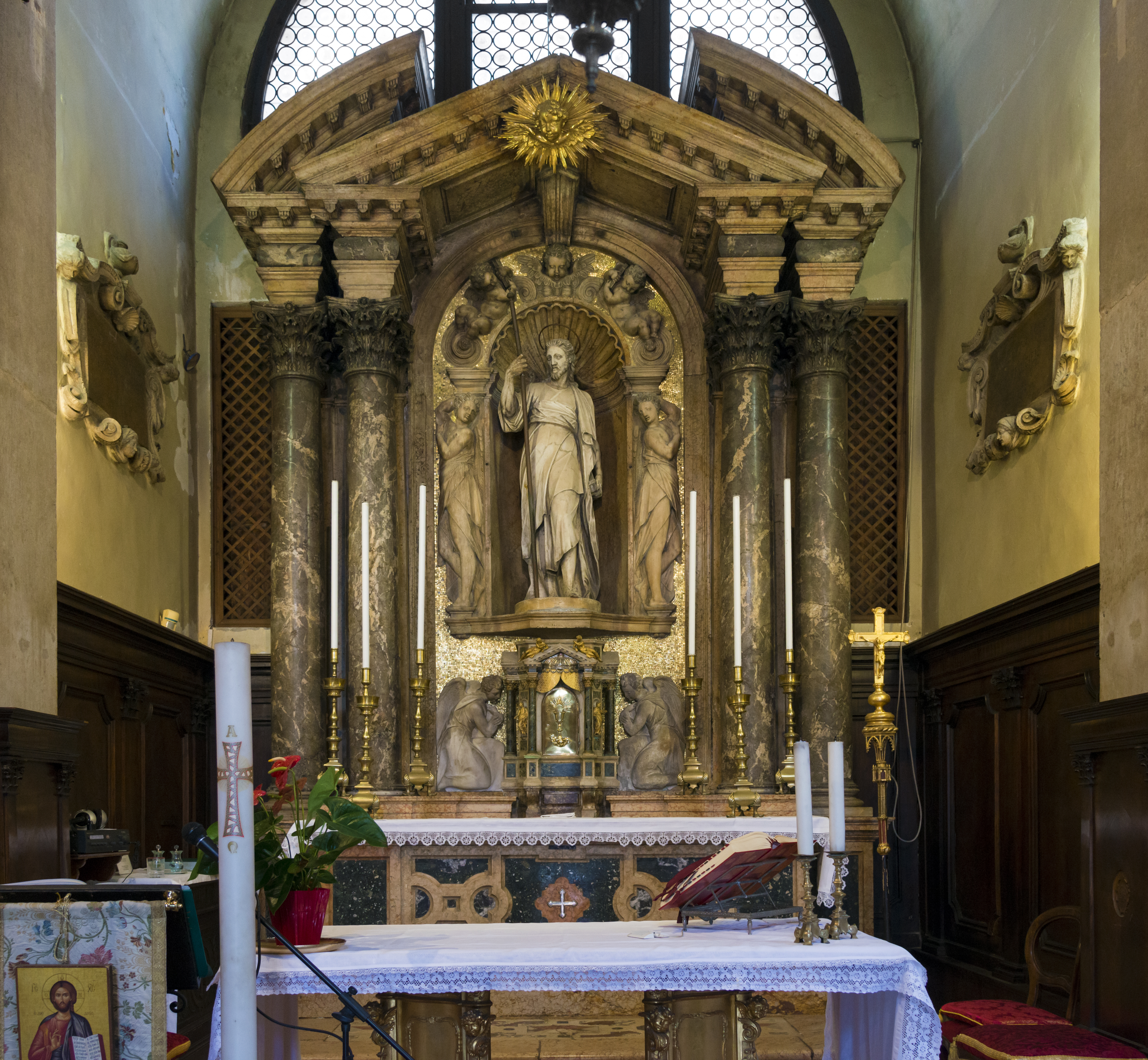
Altarpiece

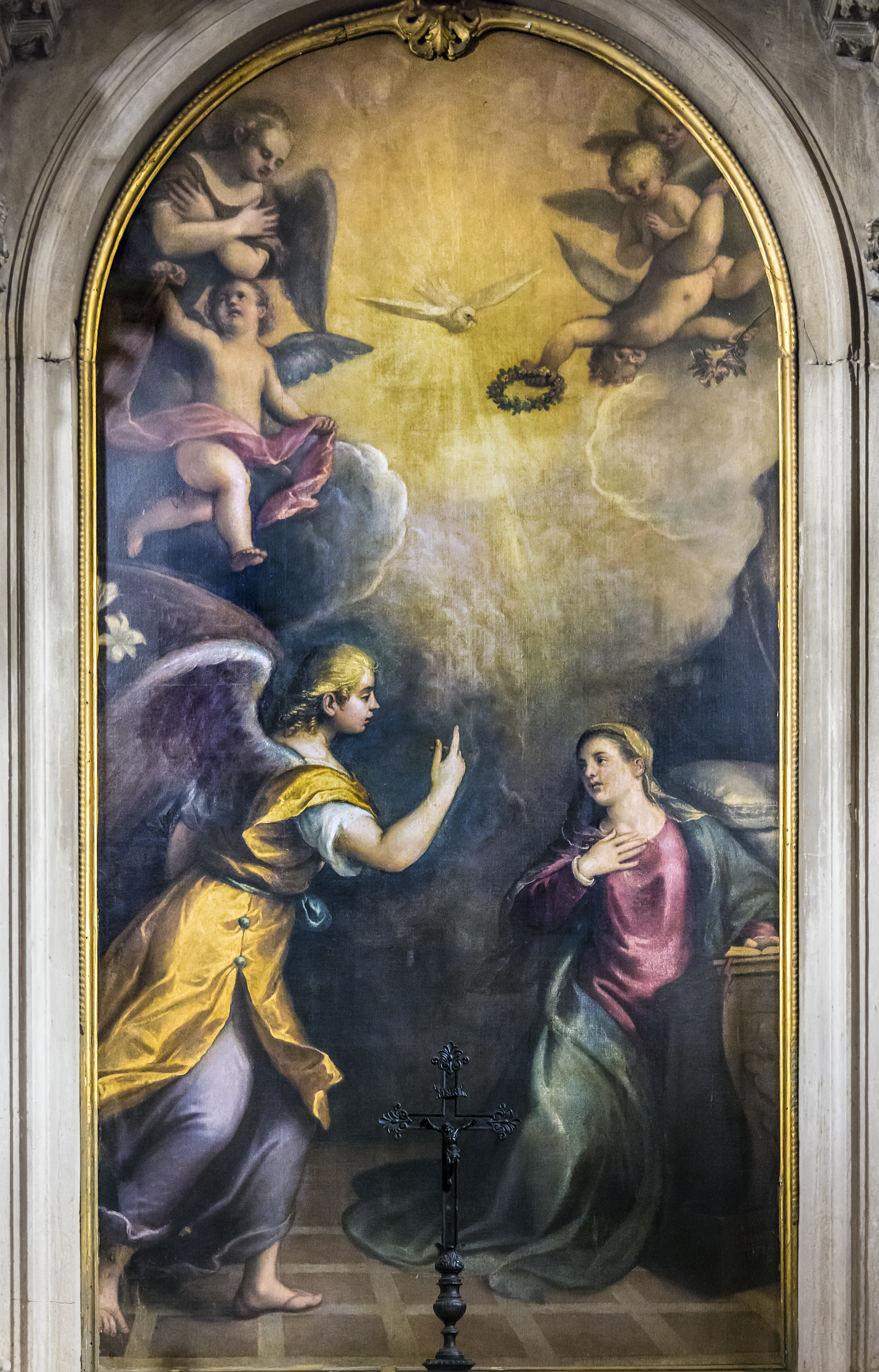
Annunciazione by Marco Vecellio

== See also ==
- Il Gobbo di Rialto: a nearby statue of a crouching man
- High medieval domes

== Sources ==
- Tassini, Giuseppe (1863). Curiosità Veneziane. Venice: Filippi Editore.
- Cessi, Roberto; Annibale Alberti (1934). Rialto. L'isola, il ponte, il mercato. Bologna.
- Buckley, Jonathan; Charles Hebbert; Richard Schofield (2007). The Rough Guide to Venice & Veneto.
