= Statue of Pietro Paleocapa =

Monument in Venice, Italy

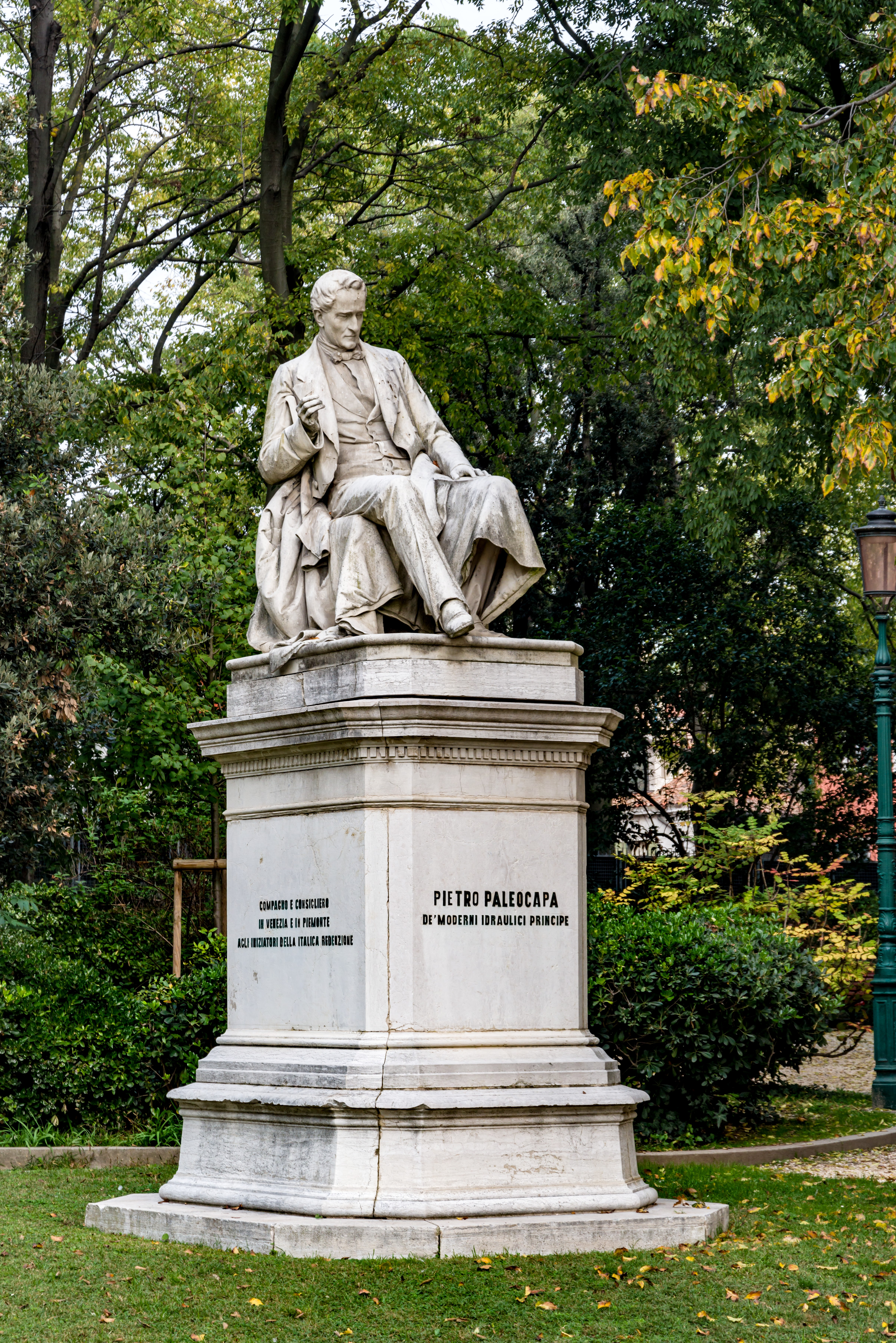
- The monument in 2017
- Subject: Pietro Paleocapa
- Location: Venice, Italy

A marble monument of Italian scientist, politician and engineer Pietro Paleocapa is installed in Venice, Italy. It was sculpted by Luigi Ferrari in 1873. The monument was originally erected in Campo Santo Stefano before being relocated to the Giardino Papadopoli.

== History ==
The monument was designed by the Italian sculptor Luigi Ferrari and completed in 1873.

In 2019, the statue and its Istrian stone pedestal underwent restoration as part of a conservation project in the Giardino Papadopoli.

== See also ==
- List of public art in Venice
