= Lion of Venice =

Sculpture in the Piazzetta di San Marco

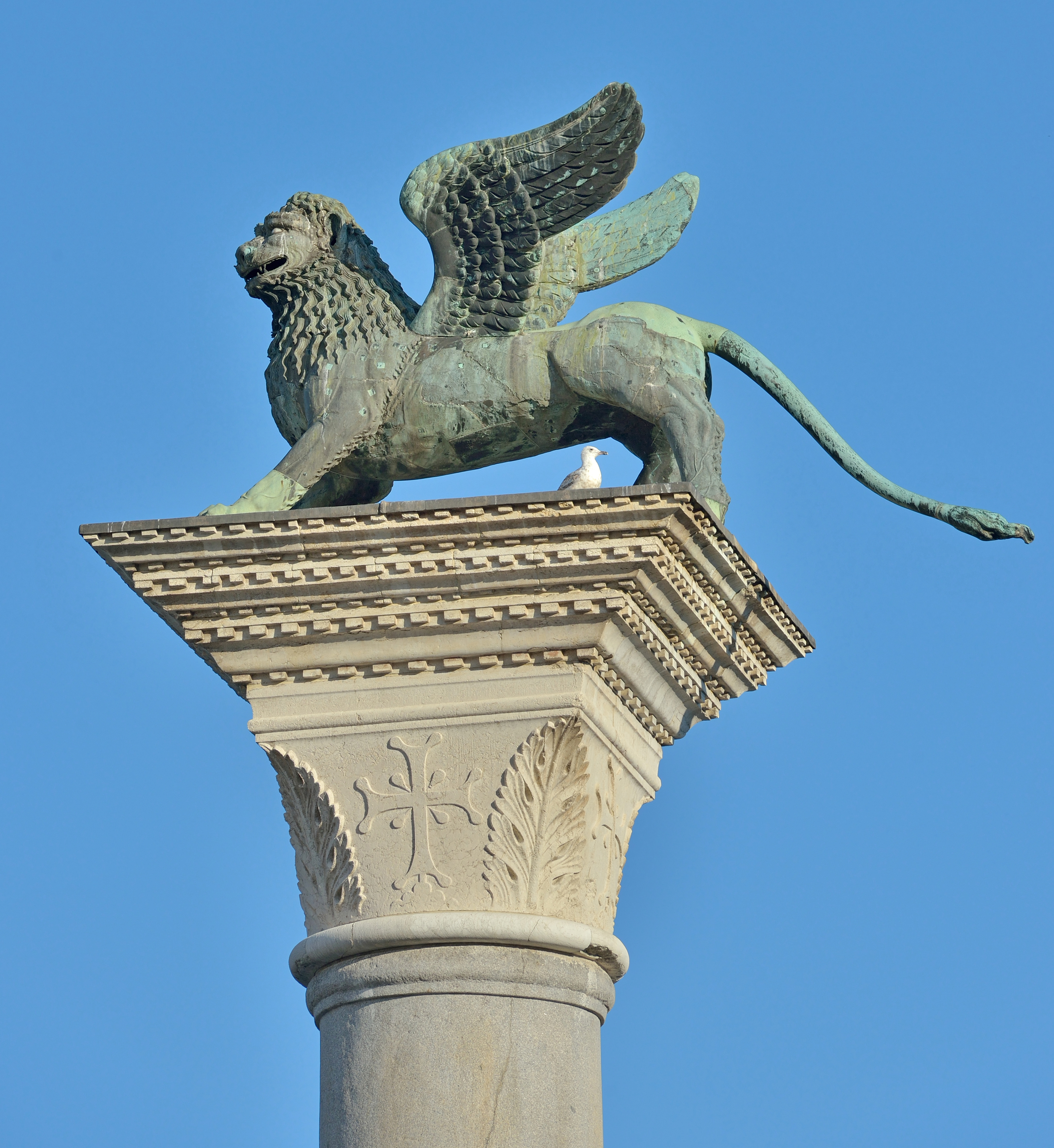
- The Lion of Venice
- Artist: Unknown
- Year: c. 600–900 AD (disputed)
- Type: Bronze
- Location: Piazza San Marco Venice, Italy

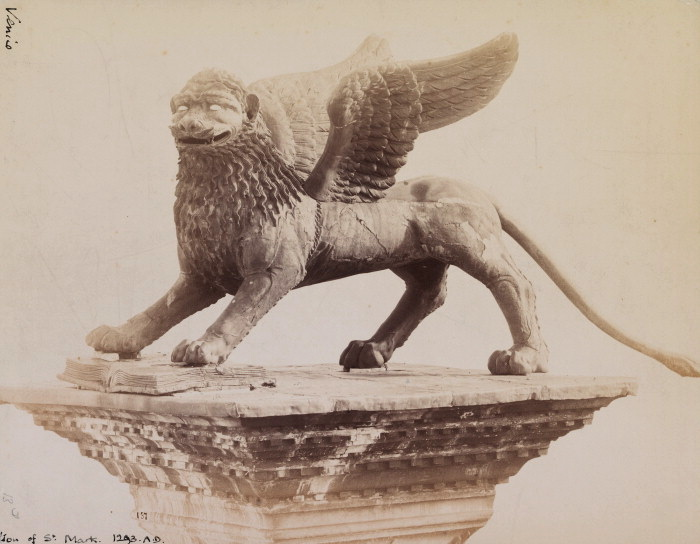
The Lion in the 1870s.

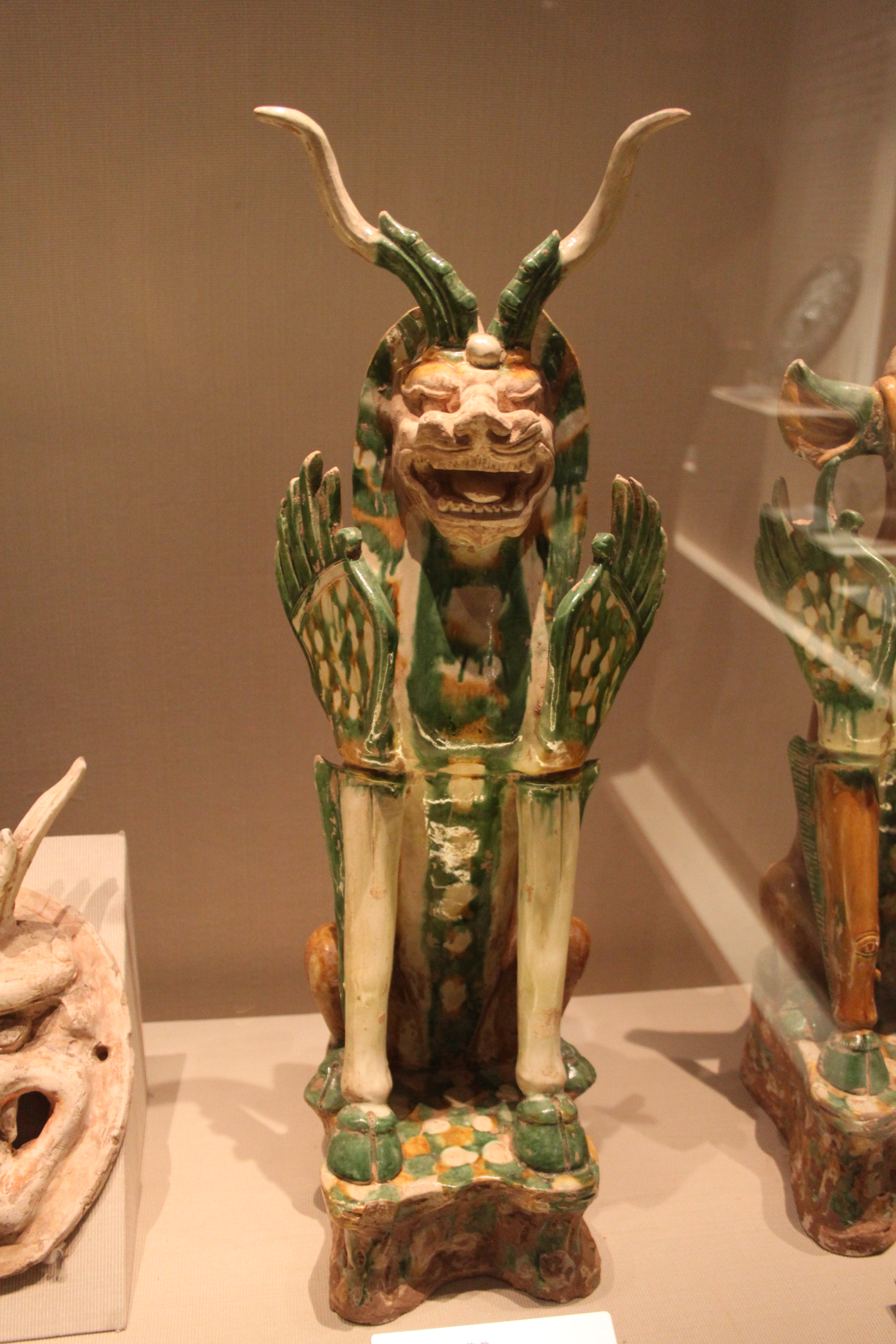
Pottery Tang dynasty tomb figure, Henan Museum, Zhengzhou

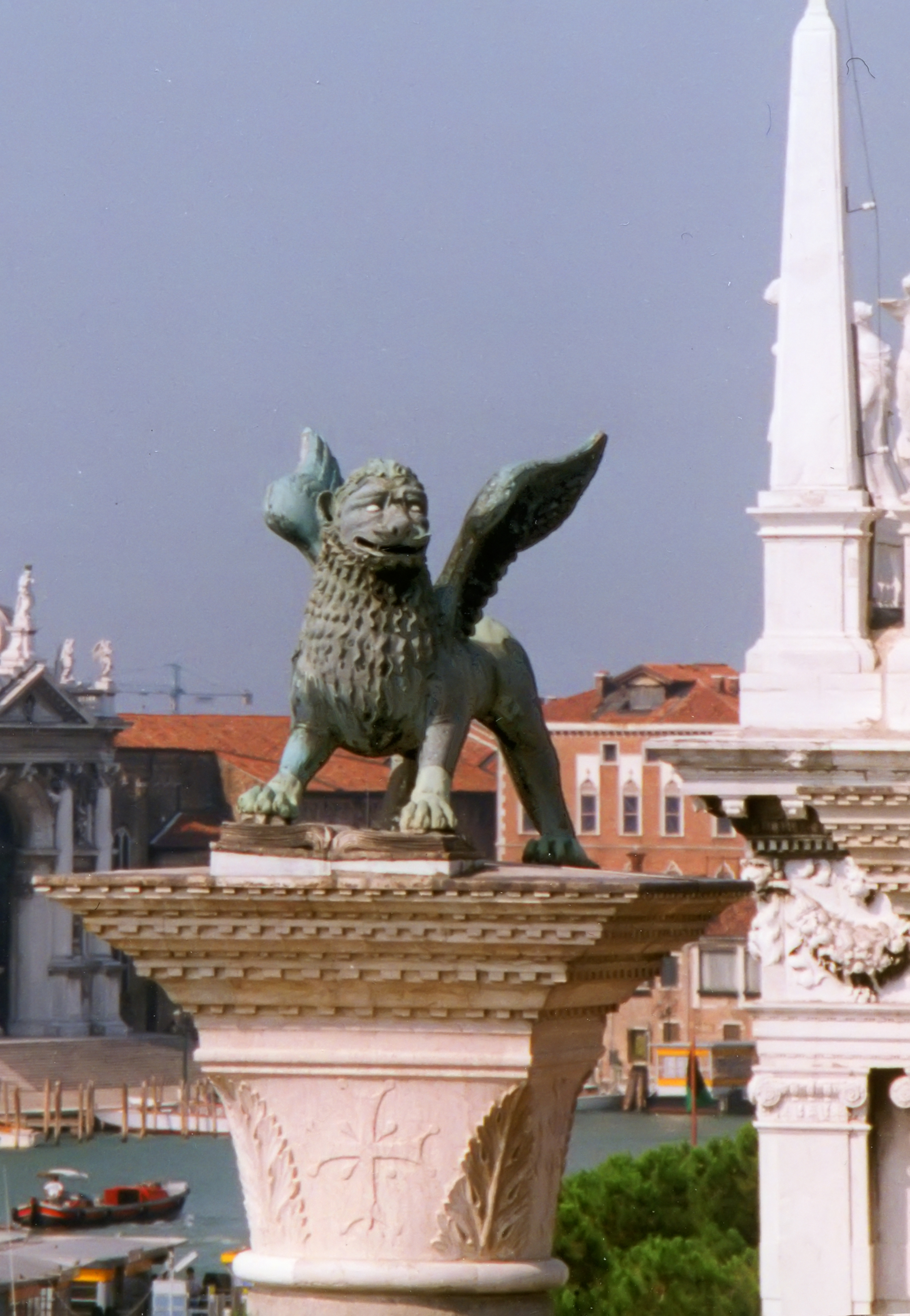
The Lion seen from the Doge's Palace.

The Lion of Venice is an ancient bronze sculpture of a winged lion in the Piazzetta di San Marco, in the Italian city of Venice, which came to symbolize the city—as well as one of its patron saints, Saint Mark—after its arrival there in the 12th century. The sculpture surmounts one of the columns of San Marco and San Todaro, two large granite columns in the square, which are thought to have been erected between 1172 and 1177 during the reign of Doge Sebastiano Ziani or about 1268, bearing ancient symbols of the two patron saints of Venice. The figure, which stands on the eastern column, at some point came to represent the Lion of Saint Mark, the traditional symbol of Mark the Evangelist. The figure standing on the western column is Saint Theodore of Amasea, patron of the city before Saint Mark, who holds a spear and stands on a crocodile (to represent the dragon which he was said to have slain). It is also made up of parts of antique statues and is a copy, the original being kept in the Doge's Palace. The Lion weighs approximately 3,000 kilograms. The book under its front paws is a later addition.

The sculpture has had a very long and obscure history; it is now thought, following scientific analysis of the metal in 2024, that it was at least partially manufactured in China, during the Tang dynasty (618–906), as a figure of the hybrid type of monster normally called a zhènmùshòu (Chinese: 镇墓兽, meaning 'tomb-guarding beast'). However, surviving examples in Tang dynasty tomb figures are all in pottery. It would probably originally have had horns as well as wings, and a more upright posture.

It was previously believed that its origin was in the Ancient Near East, as a winged lion-griffin statue, perhaps on a monument to the god Sandon at Tarsus in the Armenian Kingdom of Cilicia, perhaps cast around 300 BC.

Regarding the lion's arrival in Venice, there is speculation that the sculpture was part of the luggage of Niccolò and Maffeo Polo, father and uncle of the explorer Marco Polo. Around 1265, they visited the Mongol emperor Kublai Khan in Khanbaliq (present-day Beijing), where they were able to find the piece.

== History ==
=== Origin ===
The Lion, in its present form, is a composite of different pieces of bronze created at very different times, building upon ancient "core" components. It has undergone extensive restoration and repair work at various times. It is likely that the statue was assembled into something like its present form by or during the medieval period. The earliest textual reference to the Lion is from 1293, when it is recorded as having been restored after long neglect.

Scholarship over the last 200 years has variously attributed the provenance of the most ancient parts of the statue to Assyria, Sassania, Greco-Bactria, medieval Venice, and various other times and places. Scientific and art-historical studies in the 1980s led to the hypothesis that it was created between the end of the 4th and the beginning of the 3rd centuries BC somewhere in the Hellenistic Greek or Oriental Greek world. More recent studies, however, suggest that the statue probably comes from the regions near the lower course of the Yangtze River, in eastern China, and was probably cast sometime in the period from the 7th to the early 10th century AD, during the reign of the Tang dynasty. The original bronze figure, taken as a whole, was probably significantly different from the Lion of today, and would not have originally had any association with Saint Mark.

=== Expatriation and repatriation ===
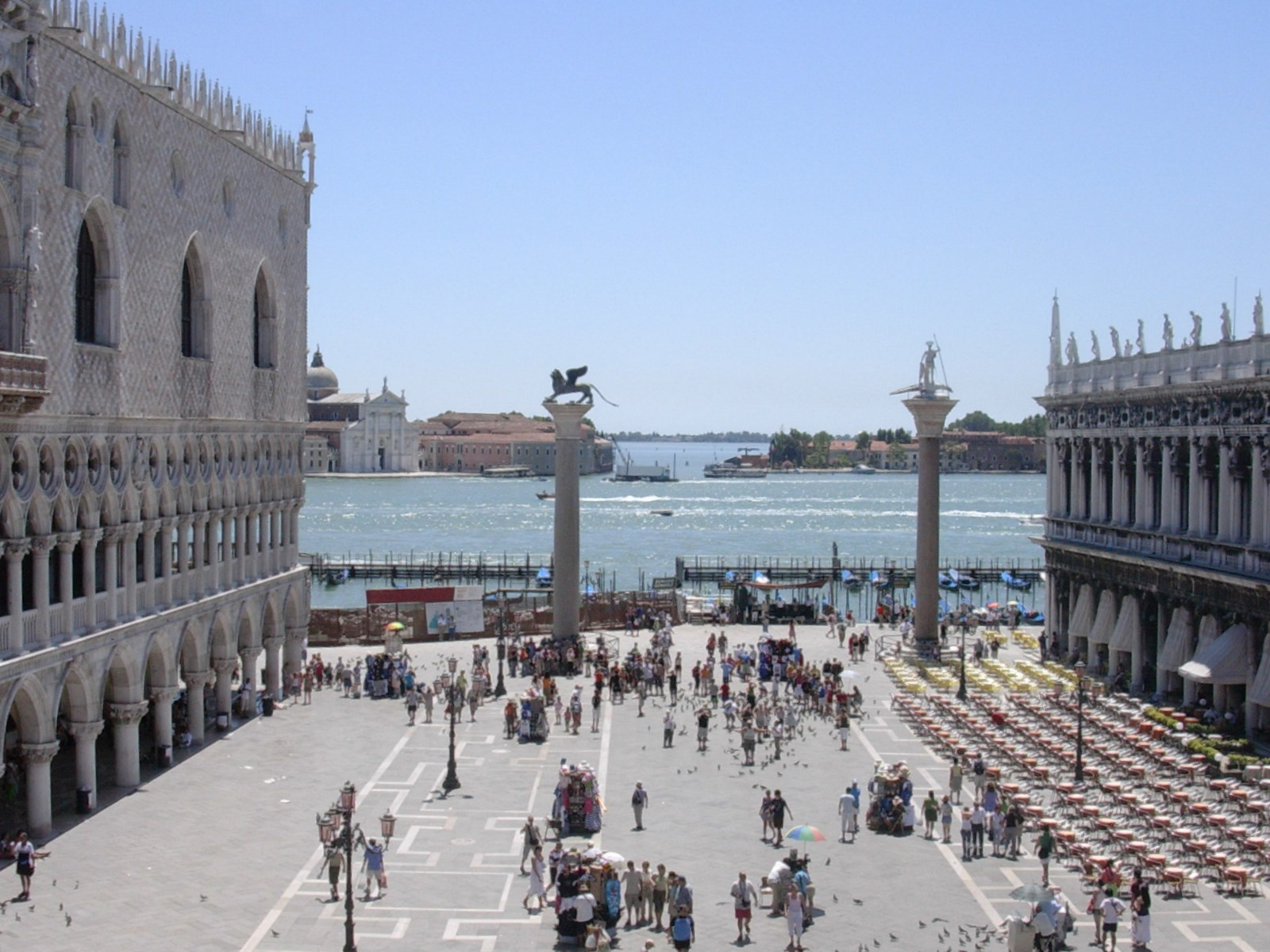
The Piazzetta di San Marco with the two columns in their centuries-old setting.

The Lion was taken to France after Napoleon's conquest of the Venetian Republic, during his 1797 campaign in Italy. It was damaged in the course of removal and transport, lacking wings, paws, tail, and Gospel-book. After being restored by French sculptors, possibly Edme Gaulle or Jean Guillaume Moitte, the Lion was mounted on a plinth in the new Fontaine des Invalides. The fountain, completed in 1804, was located at the Place des Invalides, Paris.

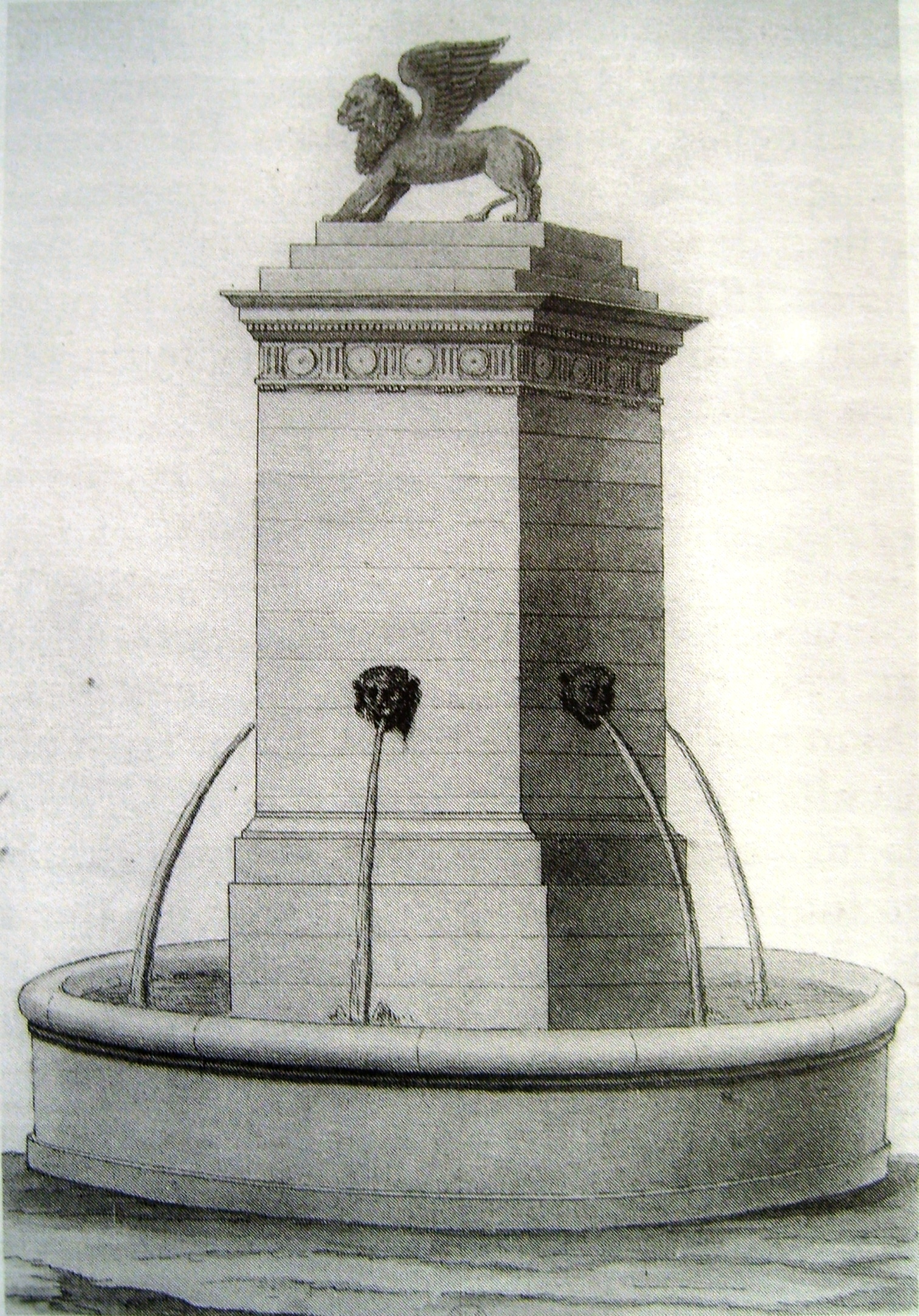
Fontaine des Invalides

After Napoleon's downfall the Lion was returned to Venice, now a part of the Austrian Empire. On 2 October 1815, during the process of removal, it was again badly damaged. A rope broke and the statue fell and smashed apart; whether this was by accident or an act of sabotage by one of the French workers is unclear. As a result, the bronze figure was broken into approximately 20 pieces. Having lost its main ornament, the Fontaine des Invalides was eventually redesigned, and finally demolished in 1840.

Repatriated to Venice, the fragments of the Lion were stored at the Venetian Arsenal before it was repaired by Bartolomeo Ferrari and returned to its column, officially, on 13 April 1816. This restoration included an alteration to the Lion's tail, now extended, which had previously been tucked between its hind legs. The book beneath its paws was again recast, the French replacement having been lost, stolen, or abandoned.

== Scientific analysis ==
A team of scholars of geology, chemistry, archaeology and art history from the University of Padua and the International Association of Mediterranean and Eastern Studies – Ismeo, in conjunction with colleagues from Ca' Foscari University of Venice, carried out chemical analyses of the statue in 2024.

Together with new stylistic considerations, the results indicated that the colossal statue is most likely an elaborate reassembly of what was initially a zhènmùshòu cast in the Tang period (609–907 AD) with copper from mines in the lower Yangtze River basin, the Blue River of southern China. This finding was confirmed by careful analyses of lead isotopes, which leave in the bronze unmistakable traces of the original mines from which the copper was extracted. The authors suggested that the statue may have been brought to Venice by Niccolò and Maffeo Polo, the father and uncle of Marco Polo, after their first voyage to the court of Kublai Khan.

== Iconography ==
Ultimately, the image of the Lion became a symbol of the Republic of Venice and appeared on its flag. Internationally, it is also well known in the form of the Golden Lion prize, introduced in 1949 at the Venice International Film Festival.

== See also ==
- List of public art in Venice
