= Statue of Daniele Manin =

Coordinates: 45°26′07″N 12°20′03″E

Monument to Daniele Manin
- Monumento a Daniele Manin
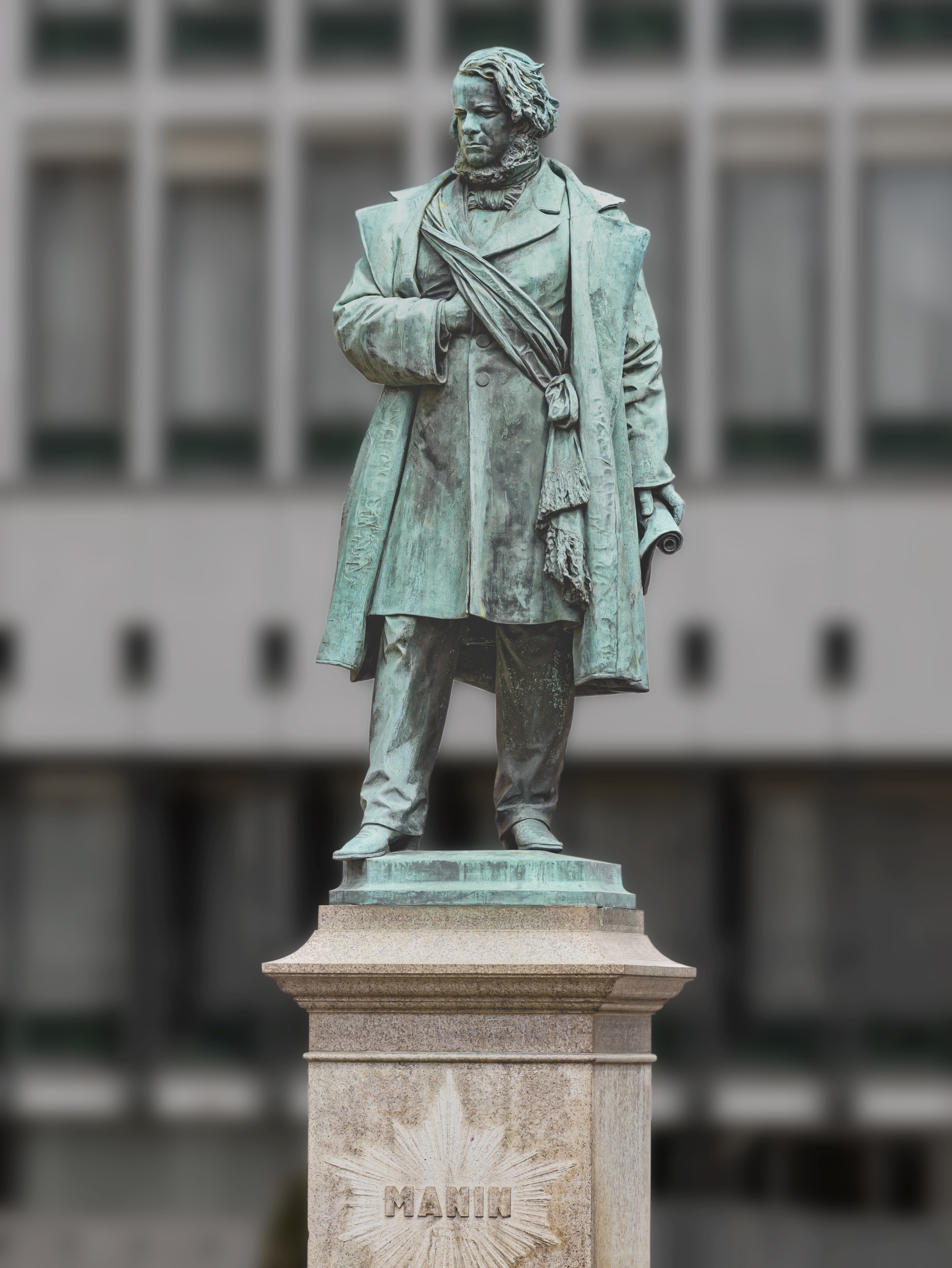
- Interactive map of Monument to Daniele Manin
- Location: Campo Manin, Venice, Italy
- Designer: Luigi Borro
- Type: Statue
- Material: Bronze
- Dedicated date: 1875
- Dedicated to: Daniele Manin

A statue of Italian politician Daniele Manin by Luigi Borro is installed in Venice, Italy, in the Campo Manin (formerly the Campo San Paternian).
