= Il Gobbo di Rialto =

Marble statue in Venice, Italy

Coordinates: 45°26′20″N 12°20′06″E

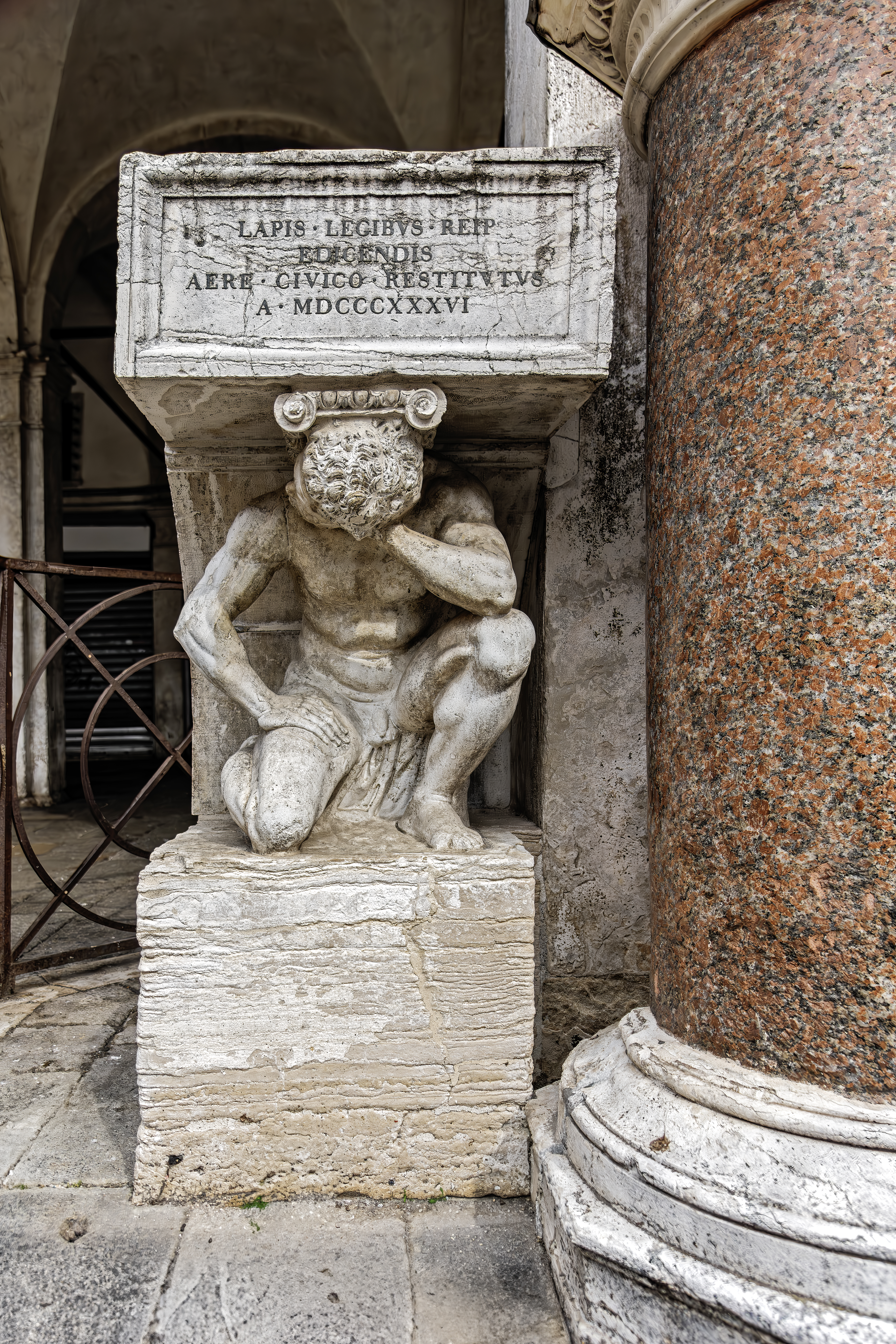
Il Gobbo di Rialto

Il Gobbo di Rialto (the Hunchback of the Rialto) is a marble statue of a hunchback found opposite the Church of San Giacomo di Rialto at the end of the Rialto in Venice. Sculpted by Pietro da Salò in the 16th century, the statue takes the form of a crouching, naked hunchback supporting a small flight of steps.

== History ==
According to the writings of Stefano Magno, it was unveiled on 16 November 1541 and was used as a podium for official proclamations. The statutes of Venice or the names of offenders would be proclaimed by an official standing on the block at the same time as they were read out at the Pietra del Bando near Piazza San Marco.

It was also used as the finishing point for a punishment for minor misdemeanours; the guilty party would be stripped naked and made to run the gauntlet of citizens lining the streets from Piazza San Marco to the Rialto, saving themselves further humiliation by kissing the statue.

By the 19th century, time had taken its toll on the statue. In 1836, it was restored with funds provided by the civic authorities. The block above the hunchback's head now bears a Latin inscription with the year of the restoration:

Lapis legibus reip[ublicae] edicendis, aere civico restitutus a[nno] MDCCCXXXVI.
(“The rock for declaring the republic's laws, restored by public money in the year 1836.”)

== In culture ==
It is said to communicate with the Pasquino, one of the talking statues of Rome. From the early 16th century, the Pasquino, a statue of a torso, was used as an agent for critical commentaries against the pope and the authorities. Satirical notes would be attached anonymously to the base of the statue purporting to come from the Pasquino himself. Other statues in Rome would be used to fulfill a similar purpose and establish a dialogue. In the 17th century, the Pasquino exchanged correspondence with Il Gobbo concerning the Republic of Venice, Pope Paul V and the writings of Cardinals Baronio and Bellarmino.

The characters of Launcelot Gobbo and his father, Old Gobbo, in William Shakespeare's The Merchant of Venice may have been inspired by this traditional symbol of the Rialto.

== See also ==
- List of public art in Venice
