= Pietro Paleocapa =

Italian scientist, politician and engineer

Pietro Paleòcapa
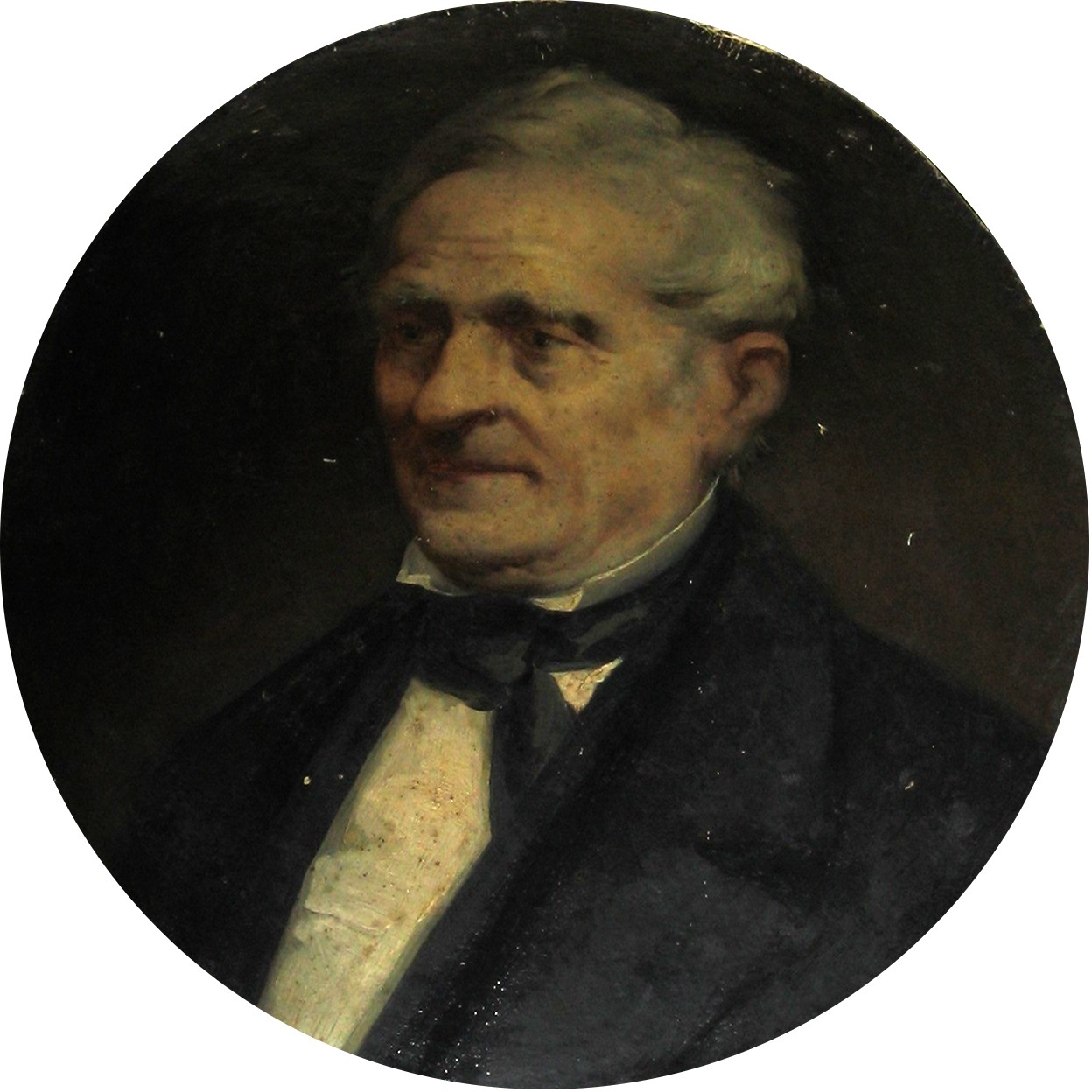
- Born: 11 November 1788; Nese
- Died: 13 February 1869 (aged 80); Turin
- Citizenship: Italy
- Education: University of Padua; Military Academy of Modena
- Occupations: Scientist, politician and engineer
- Known for: International Commission for the piercing of the isthmus of Suez

Pietro Paleòcapa (Greek: Πέτρος Παλαιοκαπάς, Nese, 11 November 1788 – Turin, 13 February 1869) was an Italian scientist, politician and engineer.

He lived and worked with success in Italy, rising to a notable level of prominence.

== Life ==
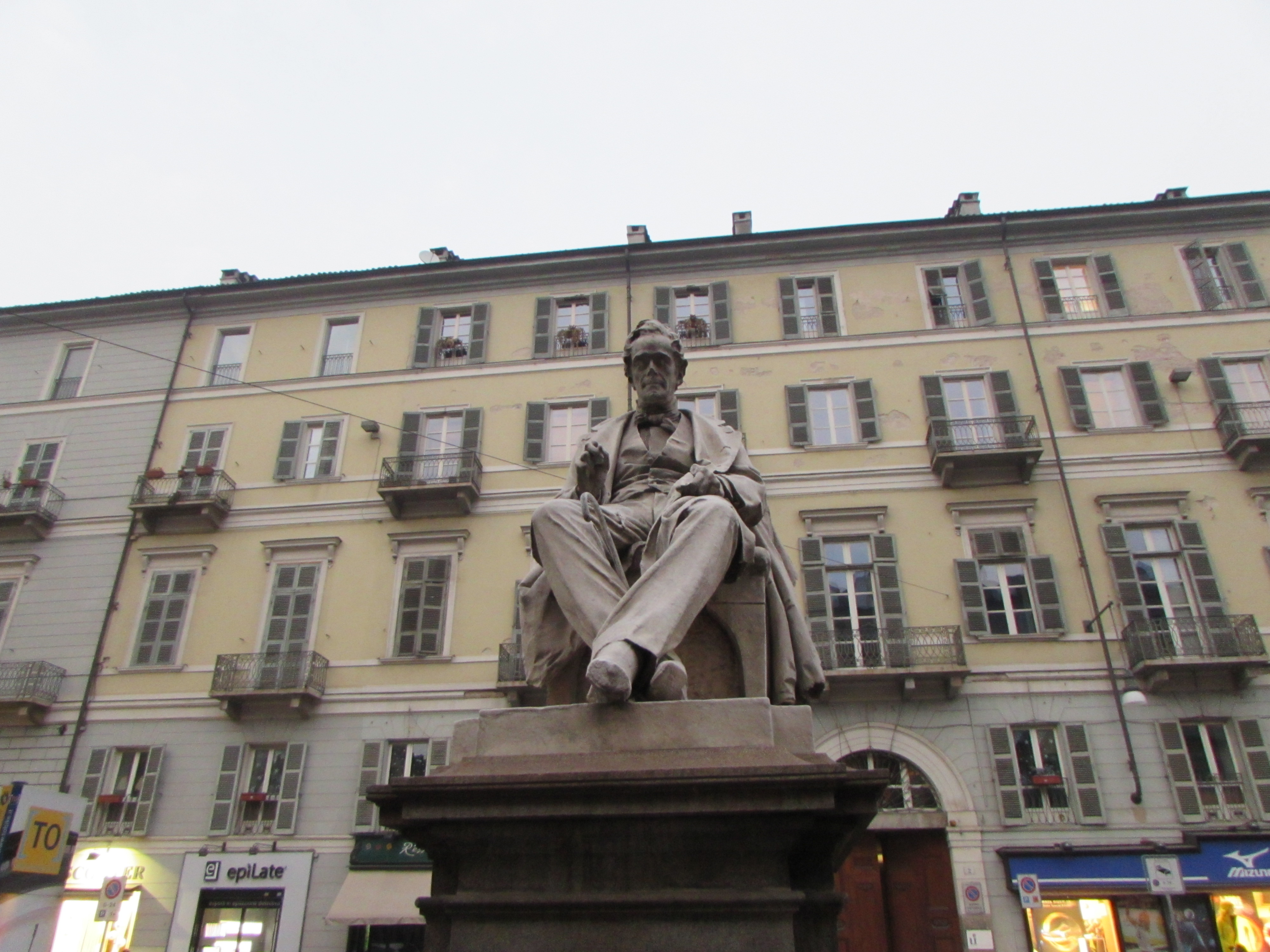
Monument to Pietro Paleocapa, Turin

Paleocapa was born in Nese, Alzano Lombardo, from a family of Greek origins who had moved to Bergamo after the Ottoman conquest of Crete. He studied law and mathematics at the University of Padua. He joined the Military Academy of Modena and became Lieutenant.

He served for two years in the Napoleonic militia, and in 1817 he joined the Venetian Engineers of Water and Streets Corp, dealing in particular with hydraulics; he worked on railways, tunnels and waterways, contributing significantly to the construction of many essential infrastructures, including the fortress of Osoppo in Friuli.

In 1813 he fought the Germans but, after the Battle of Yütterbok, he became a prisoner. He escaped and returned to Italy where he retired to private life for two years.

In 1817 he joined the "Corpo del Genio Civile" and in 1821 he was transferred to Milan. In 1825 he was called to Vienna where he was commissioned to design and direct the census. Tired of the excessive bureaucracy and therefore difficulties, he asked to be transferred to Venice in 1829.

In 1840 he became a general manager in Venice, and oversaw the works on the rivers Brenta, Bacchiglione, Adige, Tartaro-Canalbianco-Po di Levante, the drainage of several marshy areas near Verona and the construction of a dam in Malamocco, Venice. It also made Tartar and the White Canal. Because of his proven skills, he was also consulted about the regulation of the Danube and the marshes of the Tibisco area.

He was a patriot and believed in the Italian unification, and he played an important role in the negotiation of the annexation of Venice to Piedmont. As a reward, he became deputy to the Subalpine Parliament and Minister of Public Works in the Savoy government. Having become almost blind, he was forced to leave his position in 1857.

While he was in Turin, he promoted railway development with the aim of linking the Italian markets beyond the Alpine arc, working in particular on the design of the Fréjus Rail Tunnel.

From 1855, he collaborated with a key role in designing the Suez Canal, along with Luigi Negrelli. He died in Turin in 1869.

== See also ==
- Statue of Pietro Paleocapa

== Works ==
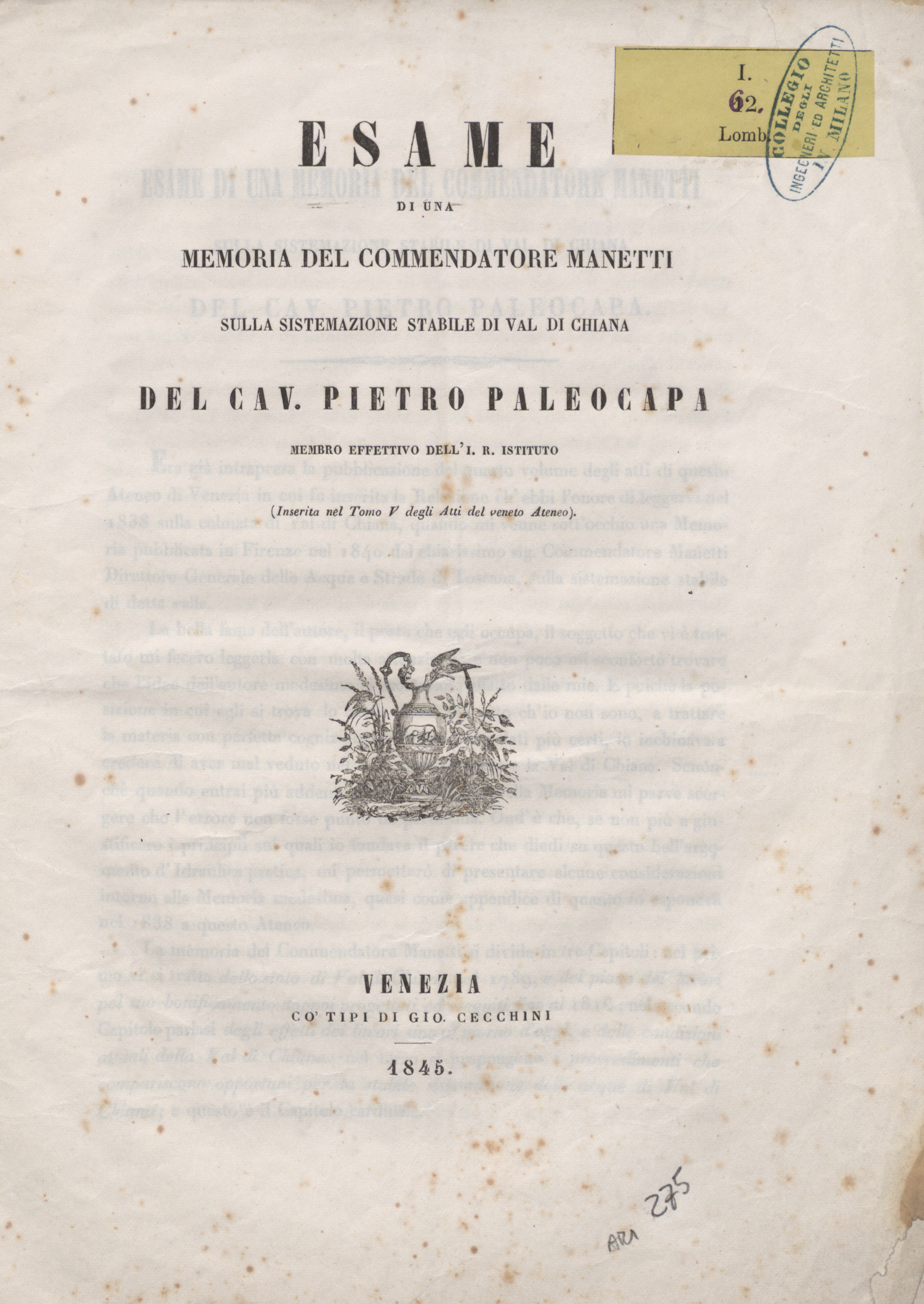
Esame di una memoria del commendatore Manetti (1845)

- Paleocapa, Pietro (1868). Sul Portosà ido. Roma: Tipografia delle Belle Arti.
- Paleocapa, Pietro (1857). Esame delle opinioni di lord Palmerston e dell'ingegnere Stephenson sul bosforo di Suez, enunciate nella Camera dei comuni d'Inghilterra. [Torino]: [Stamperia dell'Unione tipografica-editrice torinese].
- Paleocapa, Pietro (1847). Parere sulla regolazione del Tibisco. Pest: coi tipi di Trattner-Karolyi.
- Paleocapa, Pietro (1868). Parere del commendatore Pietro Paleocapa senatore del regno sulla bonificazione dei due consorzi padovani Gorzon medio e Gorzon inferiore ed altri atti relativi delle presidenze consorziali. Rovigo: Regio Stab. nazionale di A. Minelli.
- Paleocapa, Pietro (1867). Dello stato antico delle vicende e della condizione attuale degli estuari veneti. Venezia: Stabilimento tipografico Antonelli.
- Paleocapa, Pietro (1845). Esame di una memoria del commendatore Manetti sulla sistemazione stabile di Val di Chiana. Venezia: co' tipi di Gio Cecchini.
- Paleocapa, Pietro (1859). Memorie d'idraulica pratica. Venezia: Giuseppe Antonelli.
- Su la condizione idrografica della Maremma Veneta, Venezia, 1848.
- Sulla ferrovia attraverso le alpi elvetiche, Torino 1863.

Postume publications

- Carteggi di Pietro Paleocapa del 1848–49, a cura di P. Sambin, Venezia, 1952.
- Memoria Idraulica sulla regolamentazione dei fiumi Brenta e Bacchiglione (a cura di Pietro Casetta), Istituto Poligrafico e Zecca dello Stato, Roma 2002.
