= Rialto =

Central area of Venice, Italy

Coordinates: 45.4385°N 12.3348°E

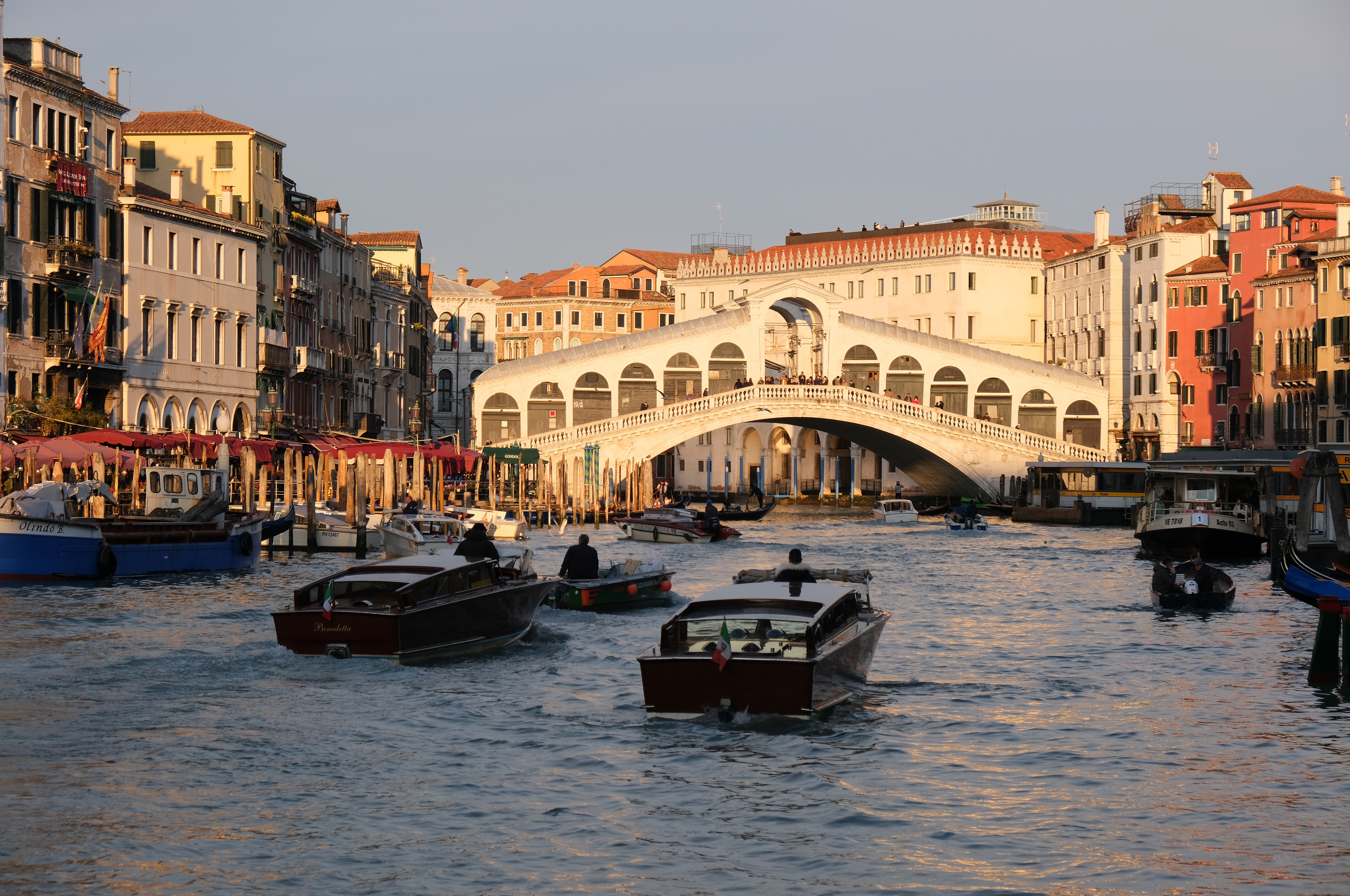
The Rialto Bridge

The Rialto is a central area of Venice, Italy, in the sestiere of San Polo. It has for centuries been the financial and commercial heart of the city. Rialto is known for its prominent markets as well as for the Rialto Bridge across the Grand Canal.

== History ==
The area was settled by the ninth century, when a small area in the middle of the Realtine Islands on either side of the Rio Businiacus was known as the Rivoaltus, or "high bank". Eventually the Businiacus became known as the Grand Canal, and the district the Rialto, referring only to the area on the left bank.

The Rialto became an important district in 1097, when Venice's market moved there, and in the following century a boat bridge was set up across the Grand Canal providing access to it. This was soon replaced by the Rialto Bridge.

The market grew, both as a retail and as a wholesale market. Warehouses were built, including the famous Fondaco dei Tedeschi on the other side of the bridge. Meanwhile, shops selling luxury goods, banks on Rialto Square and insurance agencies appeared and the city's tax offices were located in the area. The city's abattoir was also in the Rialto.

Most of the buildings in the Rialto were destroyed in a fire in 1514, the sole survivor being the church San Giacomo di Rialto, while the rest of the area was gradually rebuilt. The Fabriche Vechie dates from this period, while the Fabbriche Nuove is only slightly more recent, dating from 1553. The statue Il Gobbo di Rialto was also sculpted in the sixteenth century.

The Rialto is mentioned in works of literature, notably in Shakespeare's The Merchant of Venice, where, among other references to the place, Salanio begins Act III, Scene I by asking: "What news on the Rialto?". In Sonnets from the Portuguese Sonnet 19, Elizabeth Barrett Browning writes that "The soul's Rialto hath its merchandise...".

A fictionalized version of the Rialto is featured in the 2016 first-person shooter Overwatch as a playable map.

== Markets ==
The area is still a busy retail quarter, with the daily Erberia greengrocer market, and the fish market on the Campo della Pescheria. A huge variety of fish and seafood is available in the fish market including shellfish, squids, cuttlefish, giant tiger prawns, mullets, eels, crabs, octopuses and lobsters.

Poet and satirist Pietro Aretino, who lived opposite the market in the Palazzo Bollani, said of his view of the animated market from across the Grand Canal in 1550: "So I can truly say that I enjoy the most beautiful street and the liveliest view in the world."
