= Statue of Paolo Sarpi =

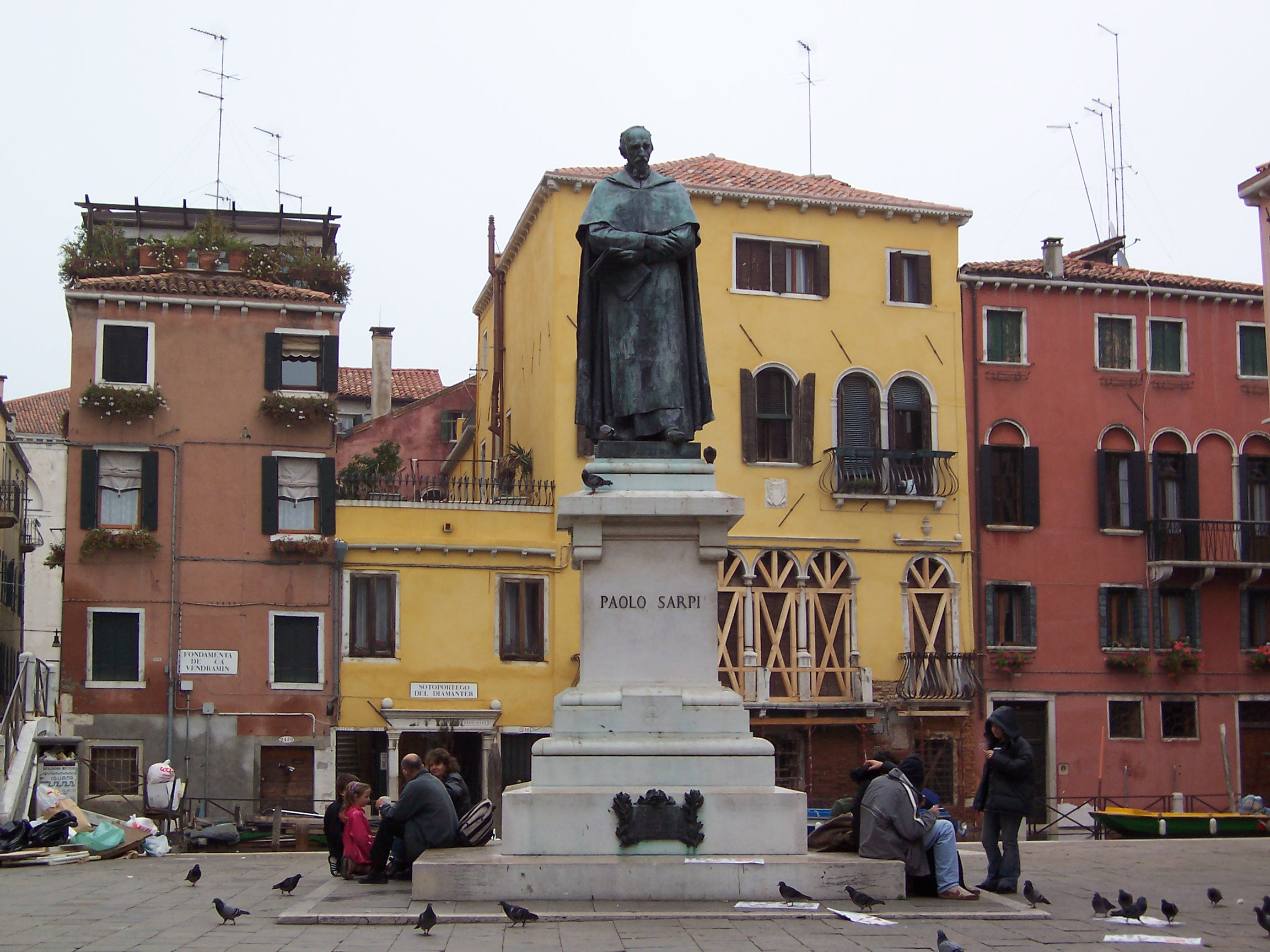
- The monument in 2004
- Artist: Emilio Marsili
- Subject: Paolo Sarpi

A bronze statue of Venetian historian, scientist, and statesman Paolo Sarpi is installed in Campo Santa Fosca, Venice, Italy. It was created by the Italian sculptor Emilio Marsili and unveiled in 1892.

== See also ==
- List of public art in Venice
