= Nicolò Barattieri =

Lombard engineer

Nicolò Barattieri was a Lombard engineer active in Venice during the 12th century. In 1180 he raised St Mark's Campanile to 200 feet. In around 1181, he built the first bridge across the Grand Canal, a pontoon bridge then called the Ponte della Moneta that was the first version of the Rialto Bridge. Barattieri also erected the columns of San Marco and San Todaro in the Piazzetta di San Marco.
