= Columns of San Marco and San Todaro =

Two columns in Venice, Italy

Coordinates: 45.4333°N 12.3397°E

Columns of San Marco and San Teodoro
- Colonne di San Marco e San Teodoro (Italian)
- Artist: Nicolò Barattieri (attributed)
- Year: c. 1172–1177 or c. 1268
- Medium: Stone columns with bronze and marble statues
- Subject: Lion of Venice (Saint Mark) and Saint Theodore
- Location: Piazza San Marco, Venice, Italy

The Columns of San Marco and San Teodoro are two columns in Piazza San Marco, Venice, Italy. They comprise the Column of San Marco, also known as the Column of the Lion, as well as the Column of San Teodoro. The statue of the Lion of Venice, which symbolises Mark the Evangelist, surmounts the Column of the Lion. The Column of San Teodoro is topped by a statue of Theodore Tiron, who was the patron saint of Venice before he was succeeded by Saint Mark. Both columns were likely erected either between 1172 and 1177 (during the reign of Doge Sebastiano Ziani) by Nicolò Barattieri, or sometime around 1268.

== Gallery ==
Images of the two columns
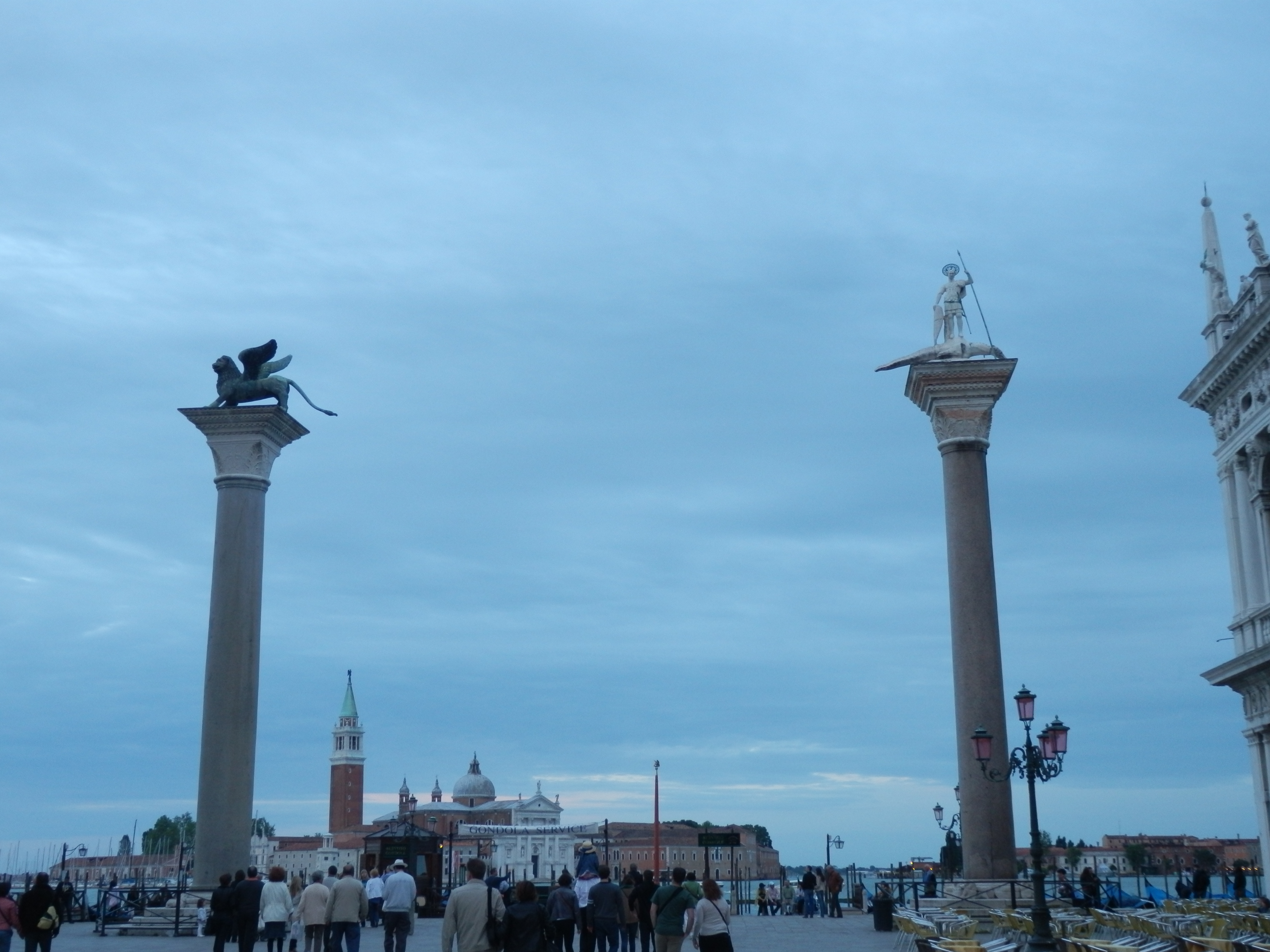
Columns of San Marco (left) and Column of San Teodoro (right)

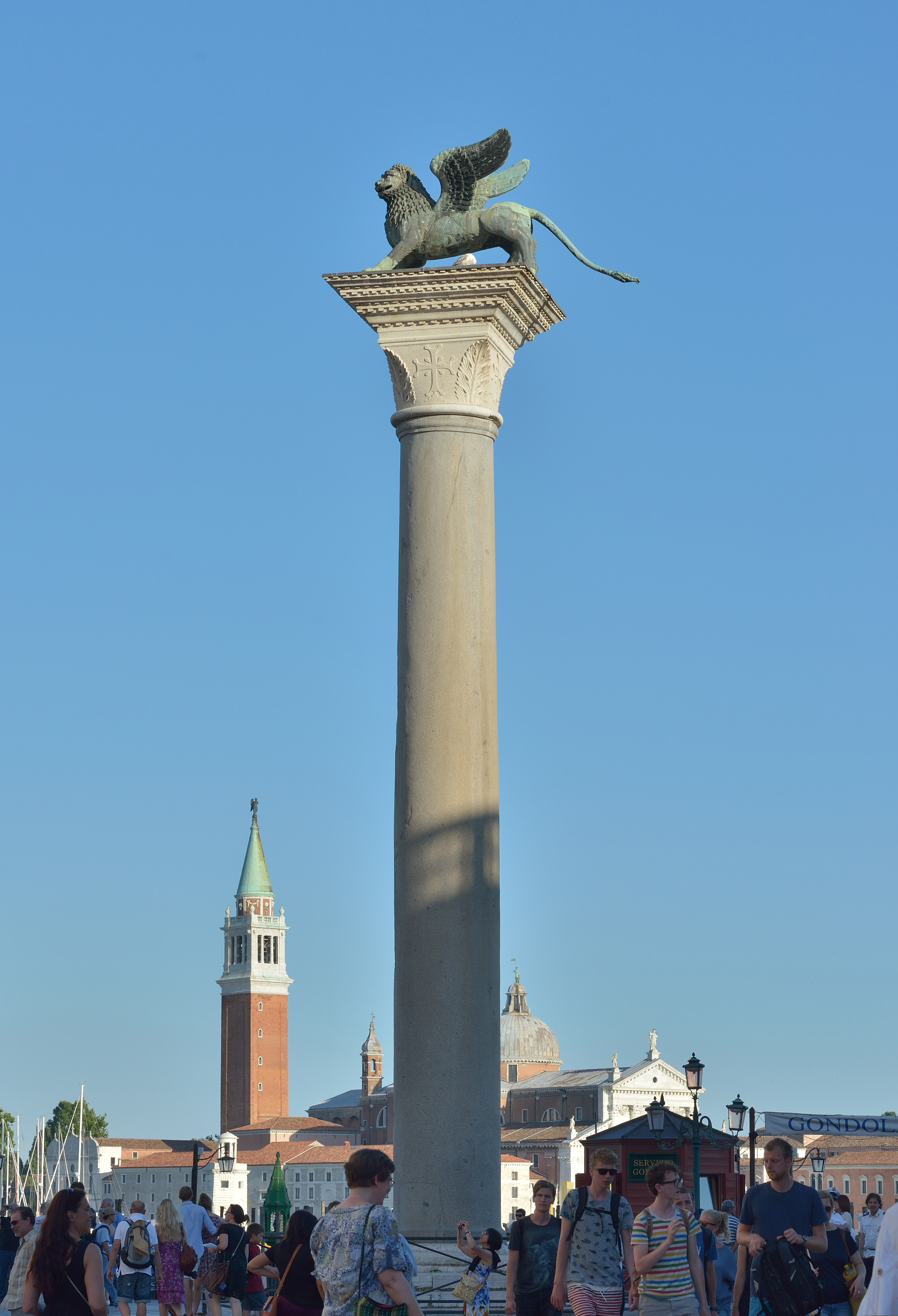
Column of San Marco

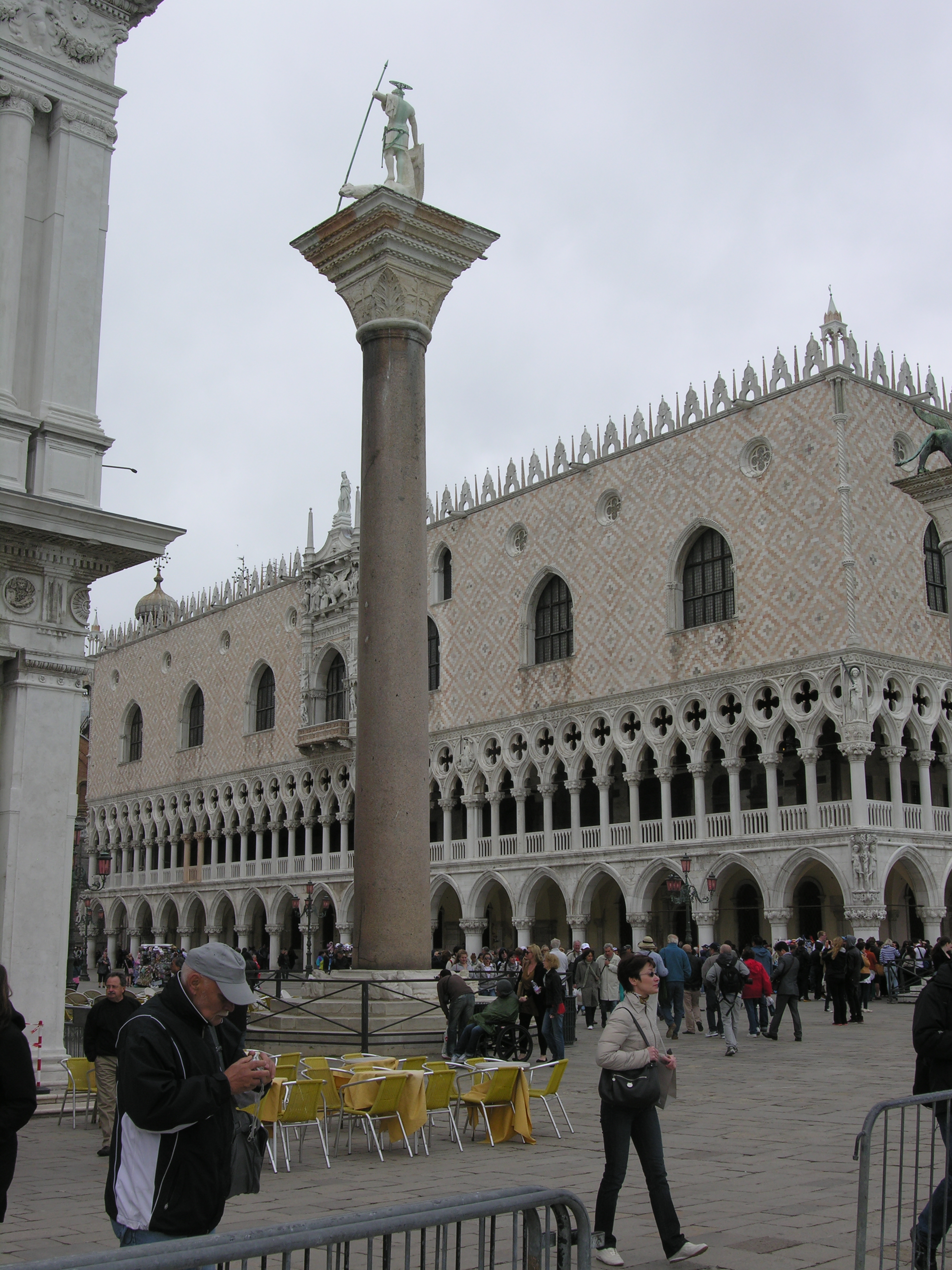
Column of San Todaro

== See also ==
- List of public art in Venice
