= Campo Manin =

Square in Venice, Italy

- Public square
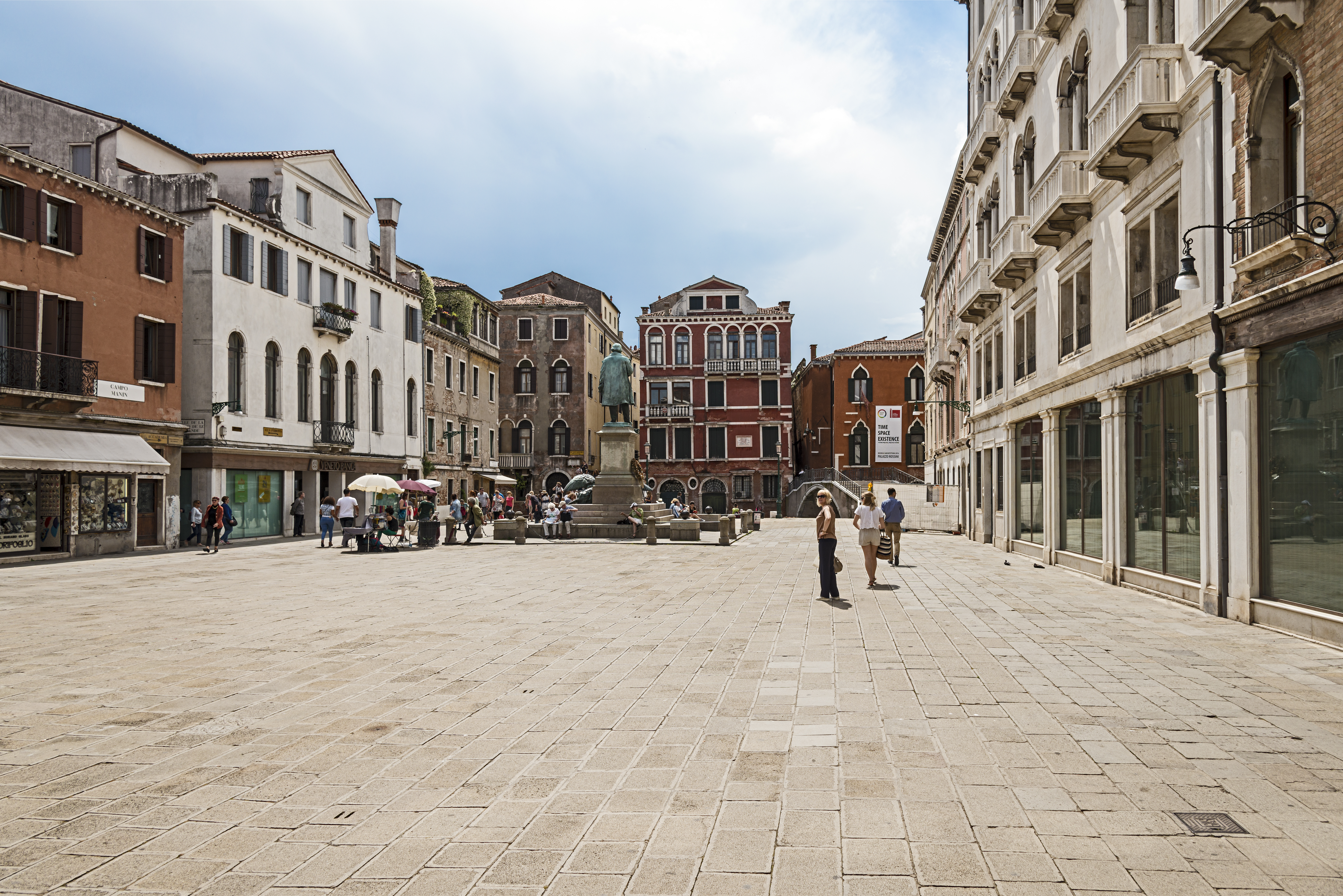
- Location: San Marco, Venice, Italy
- Interactive map of Campo Manin
- Coordinates: 45°26′07″N 12°20′03″E

Campo Manin (formerlly Campo San Paternian) is a square in Venice, Italy. It is dedicated to Daniele Manin who led the Republic of San Marco during its independence in 1848/49 and whose statue, crafted by Luigi Borro in 1875, is the center-piece. The church San Paternian was the previous name-sake of the campo but was demolished in 1871.

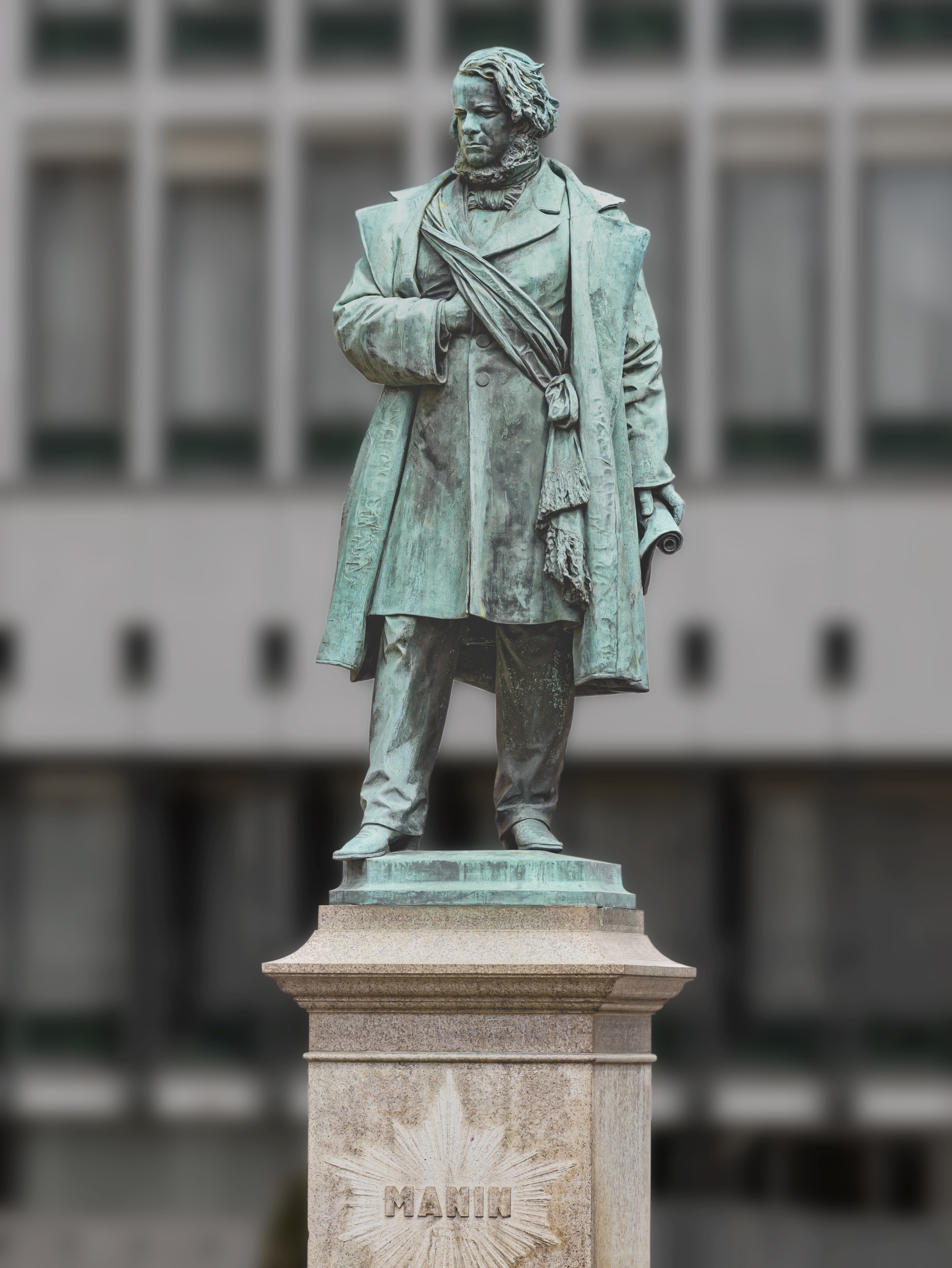
Statue of Deniele Manin

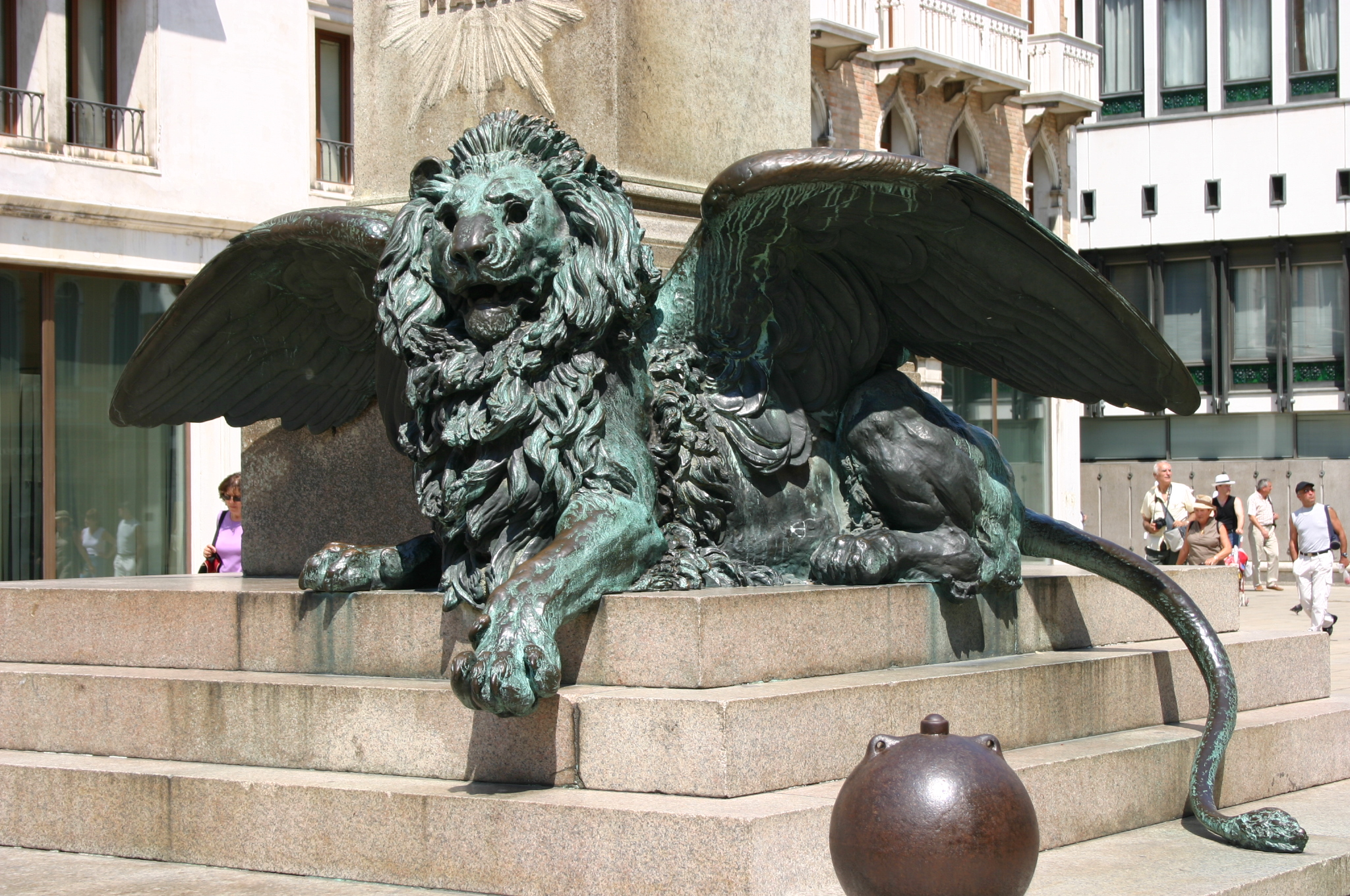
Lion of Saint Mark at the statue's feet
