= Tricolour Day =

Flag Day in Italy

- Flag of Italy
- Official name: Italian: Giornata Nazionale della Bandiera
- Observed by: Italy
- Liturgical color: green, white and red
- Significance: Celebrates the birth of the flag of Italy
- Date: 7 January
- Next time: 7 January 2026
- Frequency: annual
- First time: 7 January 1997
- Related to: National Memorial Day of the Exiles and Foibe (10 February); Anniversary of the Unification of Italy (17 March); Anniversary of the Liberation (25 April); Festa della Repubblica (2 June); National Unity and Armed Forces Day (4 November)

Tricolour Day (Italian: Festa del Tricolore), officially National Flag Day (Italian: Giornata Nazionale della Bandiera), is the Flag Day of Italy. Celebrated on 7 January, it was established by Law 671 on 31 December 1996. It is intended as a celebration, though not a public holiday. The official celebration of the day is held in Reggio Emilia, the city where the Italian tricolour was first adopted as flag by an Italian sovereign state, the Cispadane Republic, on 7 January 1797.

== History ==
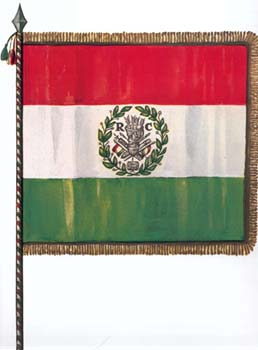
Flag of the Cispadane Republic

The day was established by law n. 671 of 31 December 1996 with the intention of celebrating the bicentenary of the birth in Reggio nell'Emilia of the Italian flag, which officially took place, as already mentioned, on 7 January 1797 with the official adoption of the Tricolour by the Cispadana Republic, a sister republic of the French First Republic born the previous year.

Previously, the Italian national colours had already appeared on the tricolour cockades and on some military banners but on 7 January 1797, for the first time, the Tricolour was officially adopted by an Italian sovereign State. To suggest the adoption of a green, white and red flag was Giuseppe Compagnoni, who for this reason is known as the "Father of the Tricolour". In the minutes of the meeting of 7 January 1797 which was convened by the founding committee of the Cispadane Republic and which took place in a room of the town hall later renamed Sala del Tricolore, it can be read:

[...] From the minutes of the XIV Session of the Cispadan Congress: Reggio Emilia, 7 January 1797, 11 am. Patriotic Hall. The participants are 100, deputies of the populations of Bologna, Ferrara, Modena and Reggio Emilia. Giuseppe Compagnoni also motioned that the standard or Cispadan Flag of three colours, Green, White and Red, should be rendered Universal and that these three colours should also be used in the Cispadan Cockade, which should be worn by everyone. It is decreed. [...]

— Decree of adoption of the tricolor flag by the Cispadane Republic

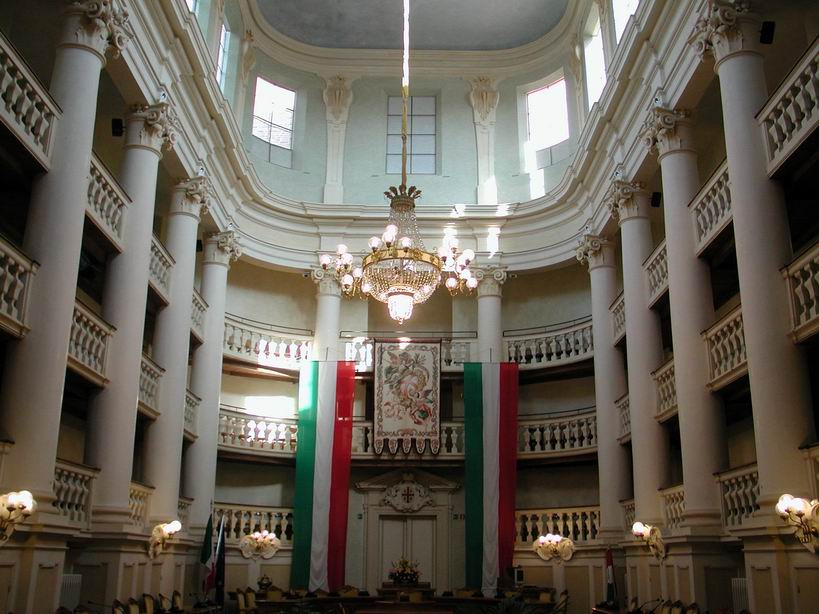
The eighteenth-century Sala del Tricolore, later to become the council hall of the municipality of Reggio Emilia, where the first Italian flag was adopted

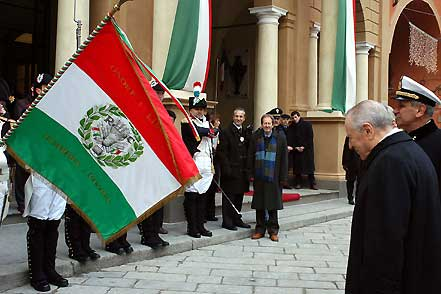
The former president of Italy Carlo Azeglio Ciampi honors the flag of Cispadane Republic, first Italian flag, during the Tricolour Day on 7 January 2004 in Reggio Emilia.

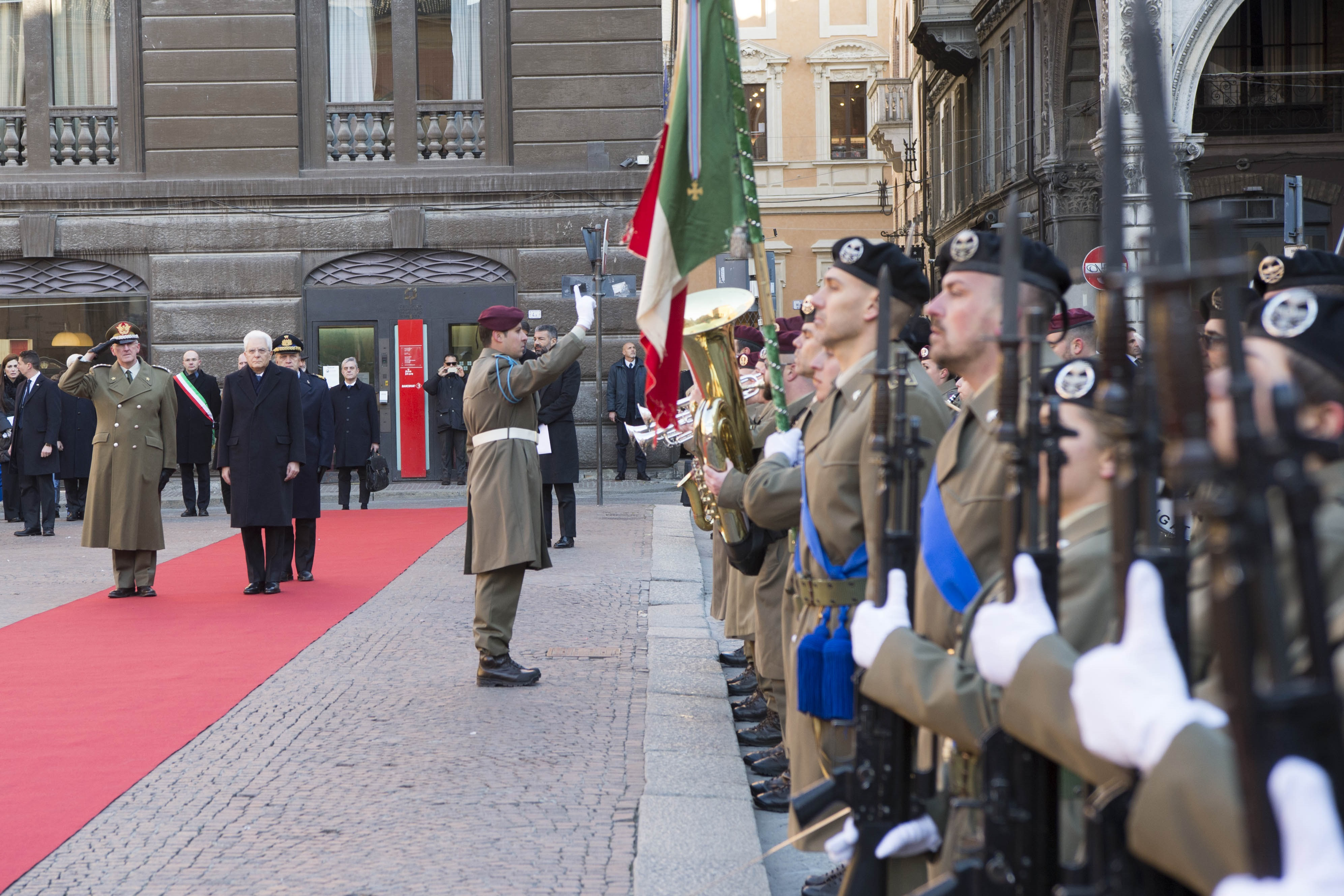
The president of Italy Sergio Mattarella during his entry into the Sala del Tricolore on the occasion of the Tricolour Day on 7 January 2017

The congress decision to adopt a green, white and red tricolour flag was then greeted by a jubilant atmosphere, such was the enthusiasm of the delegates, and by a peal of applause. In France, due to the Revolution, the flag went from having a "dynastic" and "military" meaning to a "national" one, and this concept, still unknown in Italy, was transmitted by the French to the Italians. In the assembly of 21 January, which was instead convened in Modena, the adoption of the Tricolour was confirmed. The flag of the Cispadane Republic was in horizontal bands with the top red, the white in the center and the green at the bottom. In the center was also the emblem of the republic, while on the sides the letters "R" and "C" were shown, the initials of the two words that form the name of the "Repubblica Cispadana".

The Cispadane and Transpadana republics merged a few months later to form the Cisalpine Republic, whose Grand Council, on 11 May 1798, adopted a tricolour flag in vertical bands with no crests, emblems or letters. The flag of the Cisalpine Republic was maintained until 1802, when it was renamed the Napoleonic Italian Republic (1802–1805), and a new flag was adopted, this time with a red field carrying a green square within a white lozenge; the Presidential Standard of Italy in use since 14 October 2000 was inspired by this flag. It was during this period that the green, white and red tricolour predominantly penetrated the collective imagination of the Italians, becoming an unequivocal symbol of Italianness. In less than 20 years, the red, white and green flag had acquired its own peculiarity from a simple flag derived from the French one, becoming very famous and known.

In the same year, after Napoleon had crowned himself as the first French Emperor, the Italian Republic was transformed into the first Napoleonic Kingdom of Italy (1805–1814), or Italico, under his direct rule. The flag of the Kingdom of Italy was that of the Republic in rectangular form, charged with the golden Napoleonic eagle. This remained in use until the fall of Napoleon in 1814.

With the fall of Napoleon and the restoration of the absolutist monarchical regimes, the Italian tricolour went underground, becoming the symbol of the patriotic ferments that began to spread in Italy and the symbol which united all the efforts of the Italian people towards freedom and independence. In the Kingdom of Lombardy–Venetia, a state dependent on the Austrian Empire born after the fall of Napoleon, those who exhibited the Italian tricolour were subject to the death penalty. The Austrians' objective was in fact, quoting the textual words of Emperor Franz Joseph I of Austria: "[The tricolour was banned to] make people forget that they are Italian."

After the Napoleonic era, the Tricolour became a symbol of the Unification of Italy struggle. It was in fact adopted during the revolutions of 1820, the revolutions of 1830, the revolutions of 1848, the First Italian War of Independence, the Second Italian War of Independence, the Expedition of the Thousand and the Third Italian War of Independence. With the proclamation of the Kingdom of Italy, the green, white and red flag became the national flag of a united Italy. The Tricolour had a universal, transversal meaning, shared by both monarchists and republicans, progressives and conservatives and Guelphs as well as by the Ghibellines. The Tricolour was chosen as the flag of a united Italy also for this reason.

On 13 June 1946, the Italian Republic was officially founded. The Italian flag was modified with the decree of the president of the Council of Ministers No. 1 of 19 June 1946. Compared to the monarchic banner, the Savoy coat of arms was eliminated. This decision was later confirmed in the session of 24 March 1947 by the Constituent Assembly, which decreed the insertion of article 12 of the Italian Constitution, subsequently ratified by the Italian Parliament, which states:

The flag of the Republic is the Italian tricolour: green, white, and red, in three vertical bands of equal dimensions.

— Article 12 of Constitution of Italy

The members of the Constituent Assembly were deeply moved when they approved this article, and as a sign of joy and respect, stood up and applauded at length shortly after the approval.

== Celebrations ==
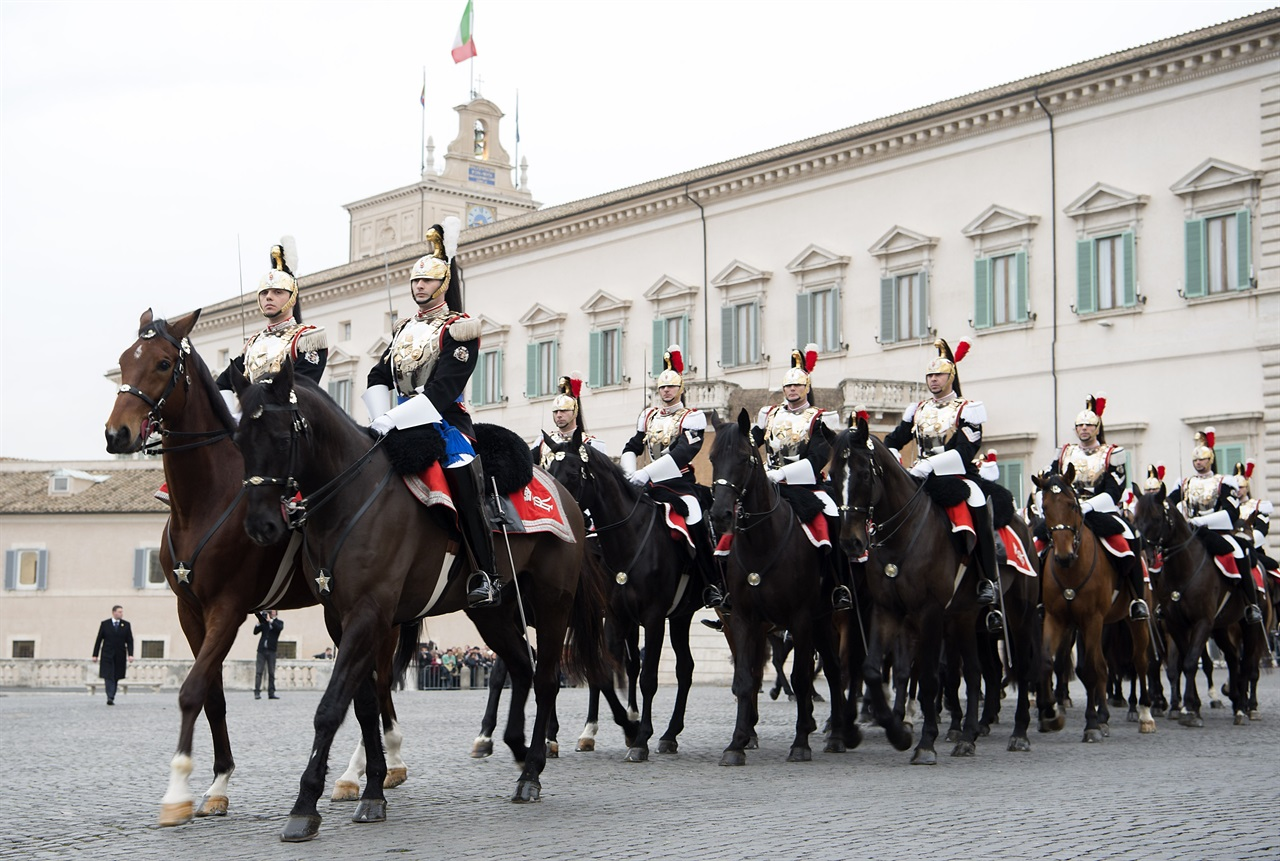
Solemn change of the Guard of honour of the Corazzieri Regiment at the Quirinale Palace in Rome on the occasion of the Tricolour Day on 7 January 2016

On 31 December 1996, with the same law that established the Tricolour Festival, a National Committee of twenty members was set up with the aim of organizing the first solemn commemoration of the birth of the Italian flag. The committee was composed of institutional personalities, including the presidents of the chambers, and members from civil society, particularly from the historical and cultural sphere. At that time it was also proposed not to celebrate the date, or even to modify the flag itself, hypotheses scarcely accepted by the members of the Parliament.

In Reggio nell'Emilia, the Festa del Tricolore is celebrated in Piazza Prampolini, in front of the town hall, in the presence of one of the most important officers of the State (the president of Italy or the president of one of the chambers), who attends the 'flag-raising on the notes of Il Canto degli Italiani and which renders military honors a reproduction of the flag of the Cispadane Republic.

In Rome, at the Quirinal Palace, the ceremonial foresees instead the change of the Guard of honour in solemn form with the deployment and the parade of the Corazzieri Regiment in gala uniform and the Fanfare of the Carabinieri Cavalry Regiment. This solemn rite is carried out only on three other occasions, during the celebrations of the Anniversary of the Unification of Italy (17 March), of the Festa della Repubblica (2 June) and of the National Unity and Armed Forces Day (4 November).

== See also ==
- Flag of Italy
- Flags of Napoleonic Italy
- National colours of Italy
- Public holidays in Italy
- Anniversary of the Unification of Italy
- Anniversary of the Liberation
- Festa della Repubblica
- National Memorial Day of the Exiles and Foibe
- National Unity and Armed Forces Day

== Sources ==
- Bellocchi, Ugo (2008). Bandiera madre - I tre colori della vita (in Italian). Scripta Maneant. ISBN 978-88-95847-01-6.
- Bovio, Oreste (1996). Due secoli di tricolore (in Italian). Ufficio storico dello Stato Maggiore dell'Esercito. SBN IT\ICCU\BVE\0116837.
- Bronzini, Giovanni Battista; Dal Mestre, Luigi (1986). "La restaurazione austriaca a Milano nel 1814". Lares (in Italian). LII (3). Casa Editrice Leo S. Olschki: 425–464.
- Busico, Augusta (2005). Il tricolore: il simbolo la storia (in Italian). Presidenza del Consiglio dei Ministri, Dipartimento per l'informazione e l'editoria. SBN IT\ICCU\UBO\2771748.
- Colangeli, Oronzo (1965). Simboli e bandiere nella storia del Risorgimento italiano (PDF) (in Italian). Patron. SBN IT\ICCU\SBL\0395583.
- Fiorini, Vittorio (1897). "Le origini del tricolore italiano". Nuova Antologia di Scienze Lettere e Arti (in Italian). LXVII (fourth series): 239–267 and 676–710. SBN IT\ICCU\UBO\3928254.
- Maiorino, Tarquinio; Marchetti Tricamo, Giuseppe; Zagami, Andrea (2002). Il tricolore degli italiani. Storia avventurosa della nostra bandiera (in Italian). Arnoldo Mondadori Editore. ISBN 978-88-04-50946-2.
- Tarozzi, Fiorenza; Vecchio, Giorgio (1999). Gli italiani e il tricolore (in Italian). Il Mulino. ISBN 88-15-07163-6.
- Vecchio, Giorgio (2003). "Il tricolore". Almanacco della Repubblica (in Italian). Bruno Mondadori. pp. 42–55. ISBN 88-424-9499-2.
- Villa, Claudio (2010). I simboli della Repubblica: la bandiera tricolore, il canto degli italiani, l'emblema (in Italian). Comune di Vanzago. SBN IT\ICCU\LO1\1355389.
