= Tricolour Flag Museum =

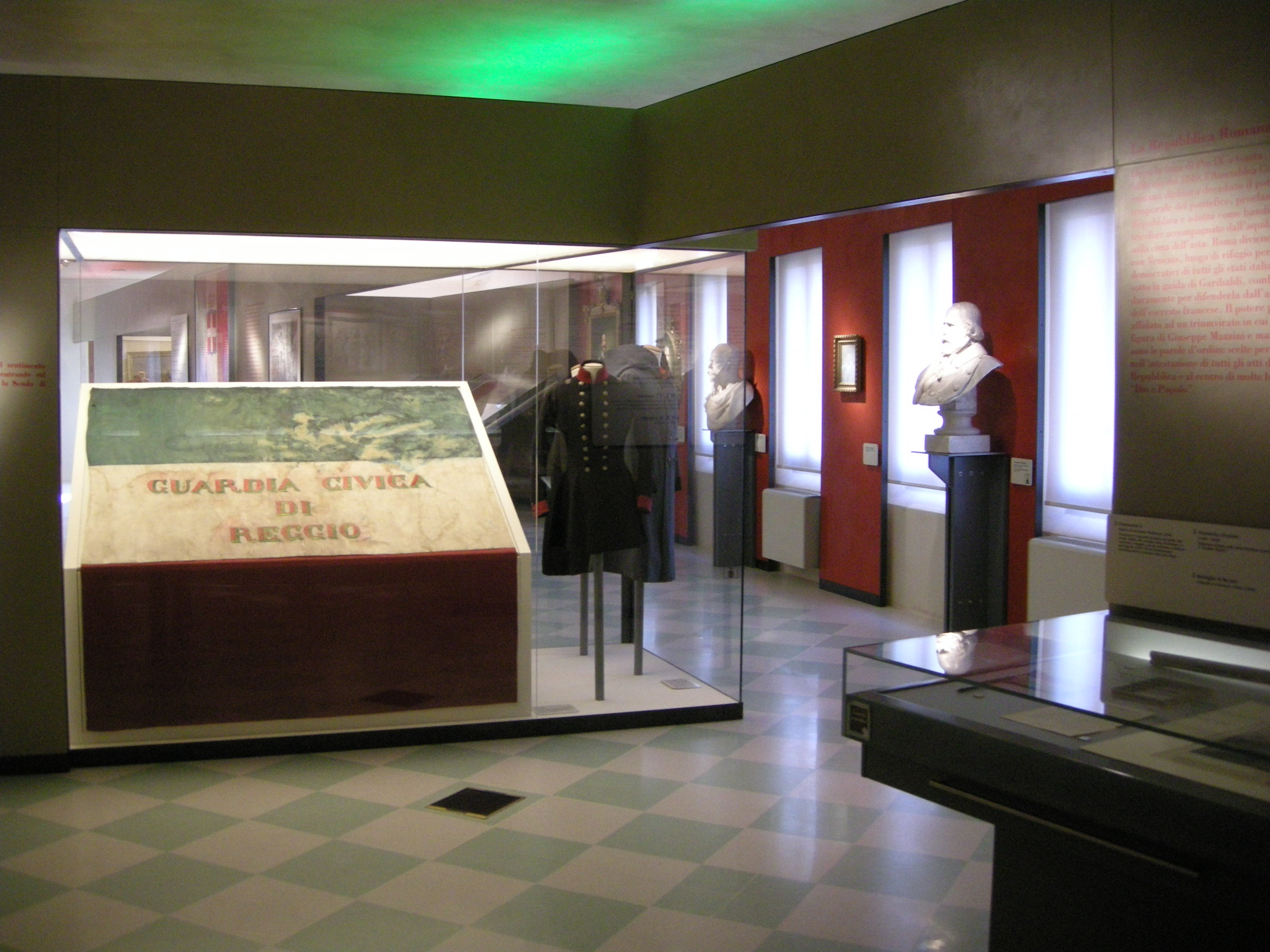
- Interior of the museum
- Established: 7 January 2004
- Location: Piazza Prampolini, 1 - Reggio Emilia, Italy
- Coordinates: 44.69713°N 10.63038°E
- Website: www.musei.re.it/collezioni/museo-del-tricolore/

The Tricolour Flag Museum (Italian: Museo del Tricolore) is located in Reggio nell'Emilia, the city that saw the birth of the Italian flag in 1797, inside the town hall of the city, adjacent to the Sala del Tricolore, whose collection is made up of relics related to the Italian flag.

== History ==
The museum reconstructs the history of the Italian flag, which was adopted in Reggio Emilia for the first time, right in the nearby Sala del Tricolore. On 7 January 1797 it was in fact chosen as the national flag of the Cispadane Republic: for the first time the tricolour became the national flag of a sovereign Italian state. In fact, previously, the tricolour was used as a war flag and as a civic symbol of local authorities. It was inspired by the French flag, which at the time was a symbol of freedom against the states of the ancien régime.

== The exhibitions ==
Inaugurated on 7 January 2004, it preserves documents, relics and Italian flags ranging from the arrival of Napoleon Bonaparte in Reggio Emilia (1796) to its fall (1814), and others from the subsequent Italian unification period. The part of the museum that houses the latter was inaugurated on 7 January 2006. The dating of the relics preserved goes back to 1897, the year of the first centenary of the Italian flag. There are also a large number of tricolor flags of the Italian pre-unification States.

== Gallery ==
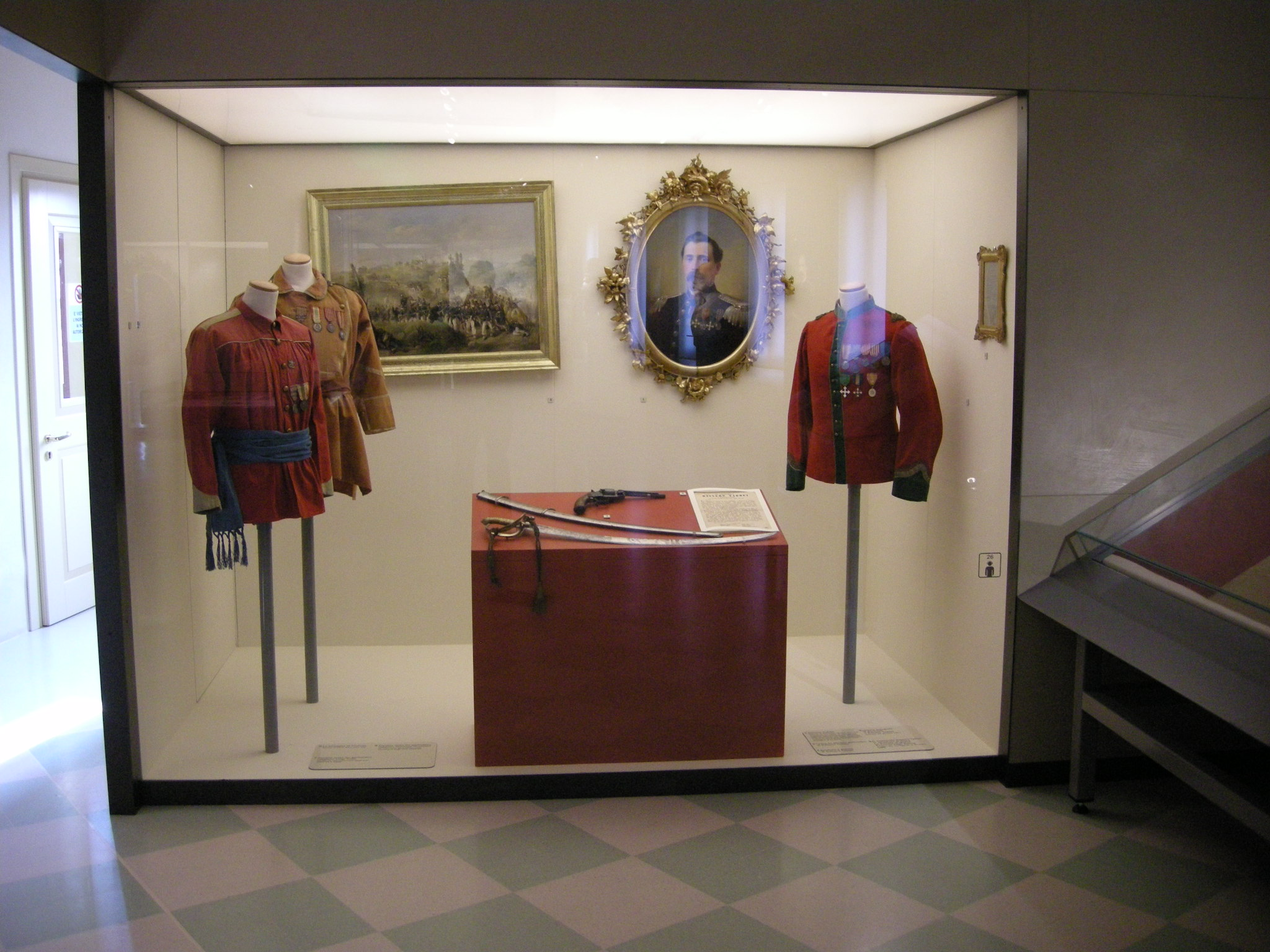
Interior of the museum

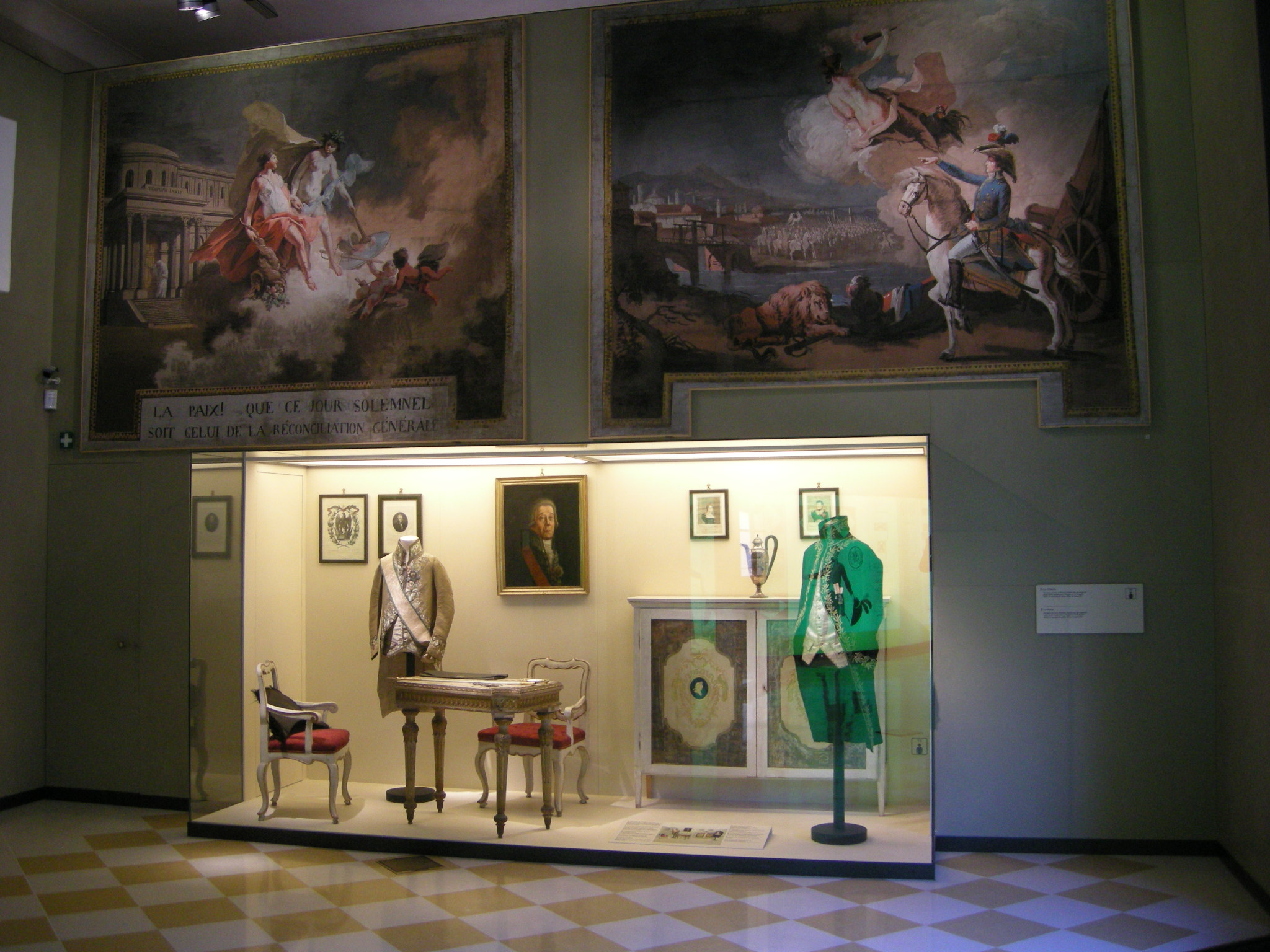
Interior of the museum

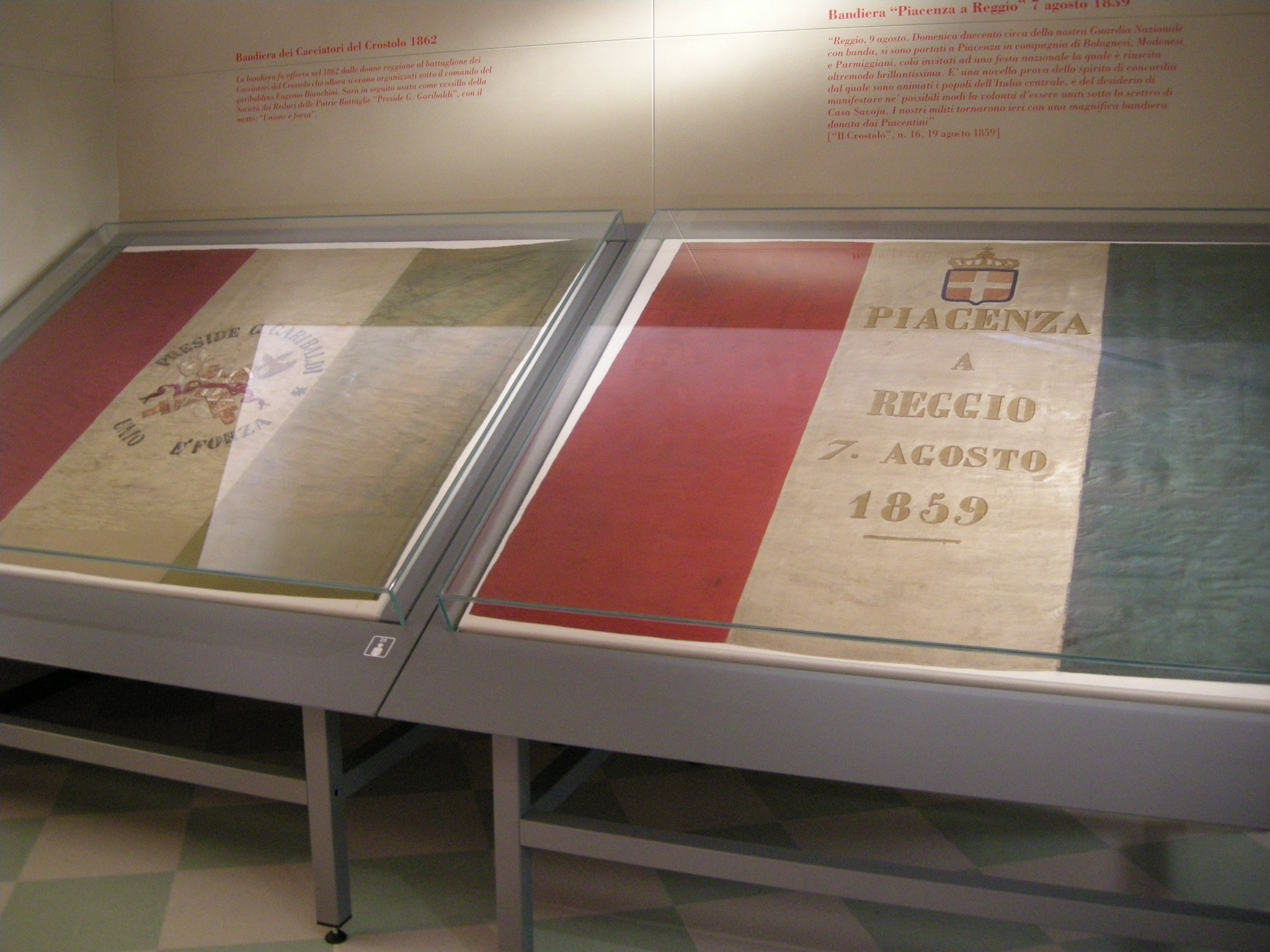
Interior of the museum

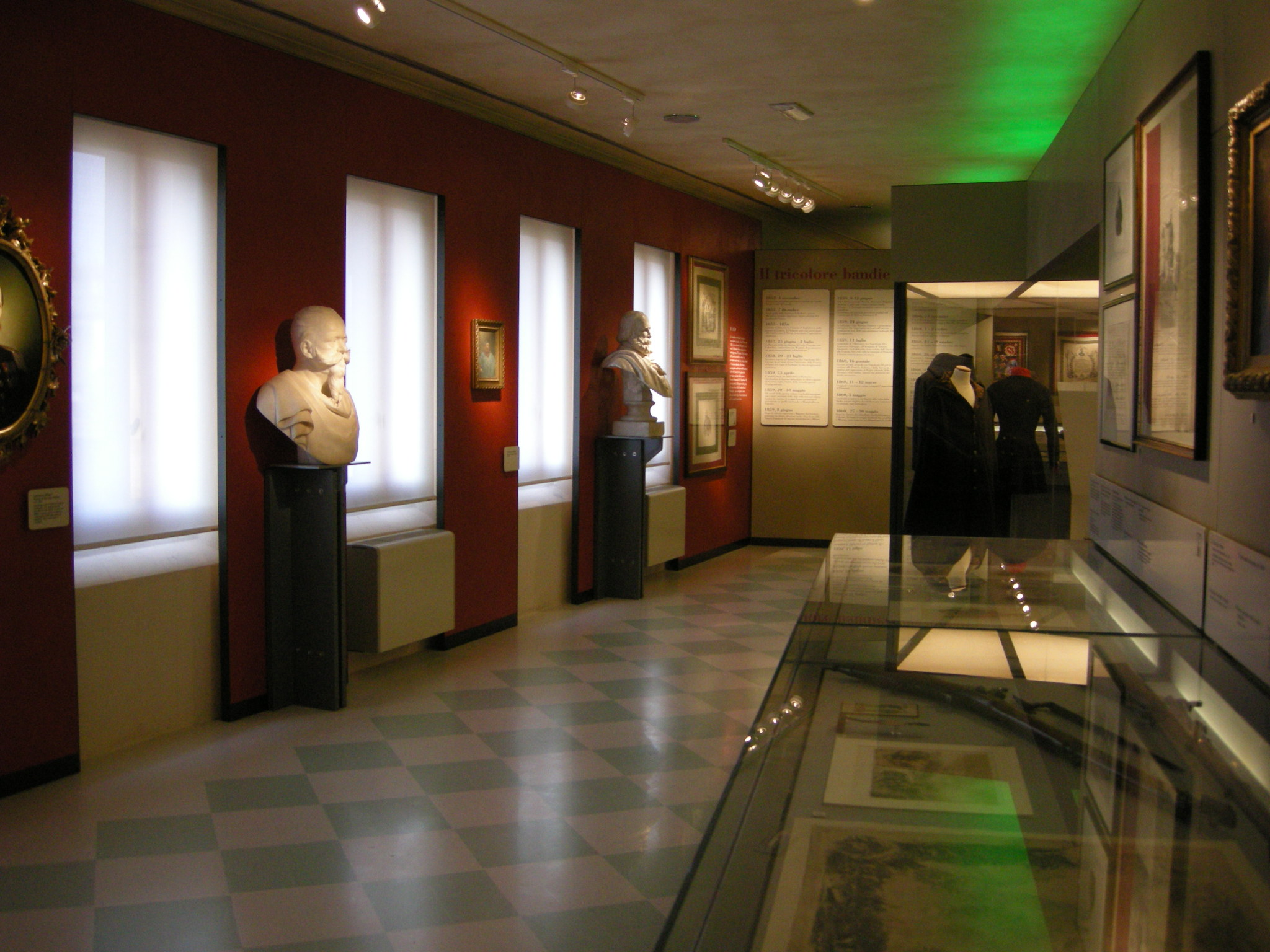
Interior of the museum

== Bibliography ==
- Busico, Augusta (2005). Il tricolore: il simbolo la storia (in Italian). Presidenza del Consiglio dei Ministri, Dipartimento per l'informazione e l'editoria. p. 207. SBN IT\ICCU\UBO\2771748.
