= Sala del Tricolore =

Coordinates: 44°42′N 10°38′E

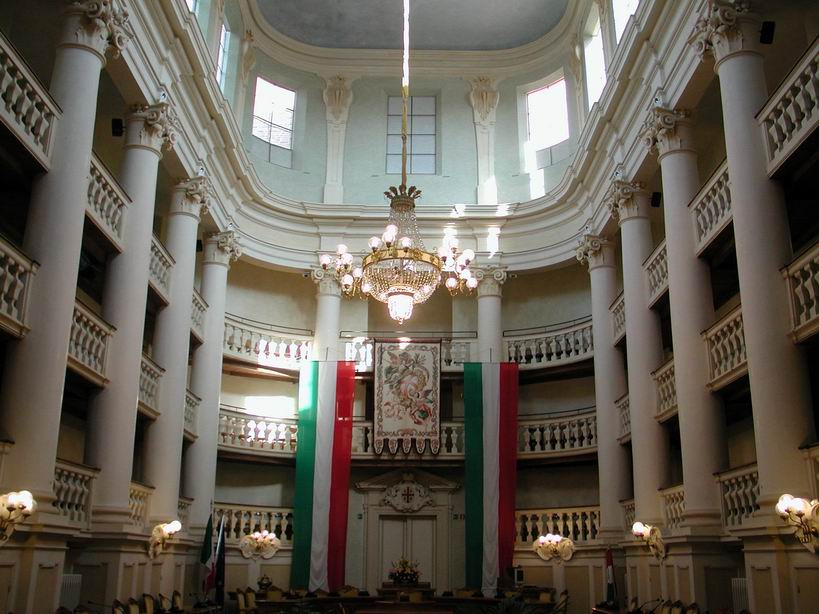
Sala del Tricolore

The Sala del Tricolore (lit. 'Room of the Tricolor'), formerly the Patriotic Hall, is an historical hall that currently serves as the council chamber of the comune (municipality) of Reggio Emilia, northern Italy. It was designed by the architect Lodovico Bolognini as the archive of the ducal family of Este. In the Sala del Tricolore, on 7 January 1797, the flag of Italy (also known as "the Tricolor") was born, hence the name of the hall. Adjacent to the room is the Tricolour Flag Museum, whose collection is made up of relics related to the Italian flag.

== Description ==
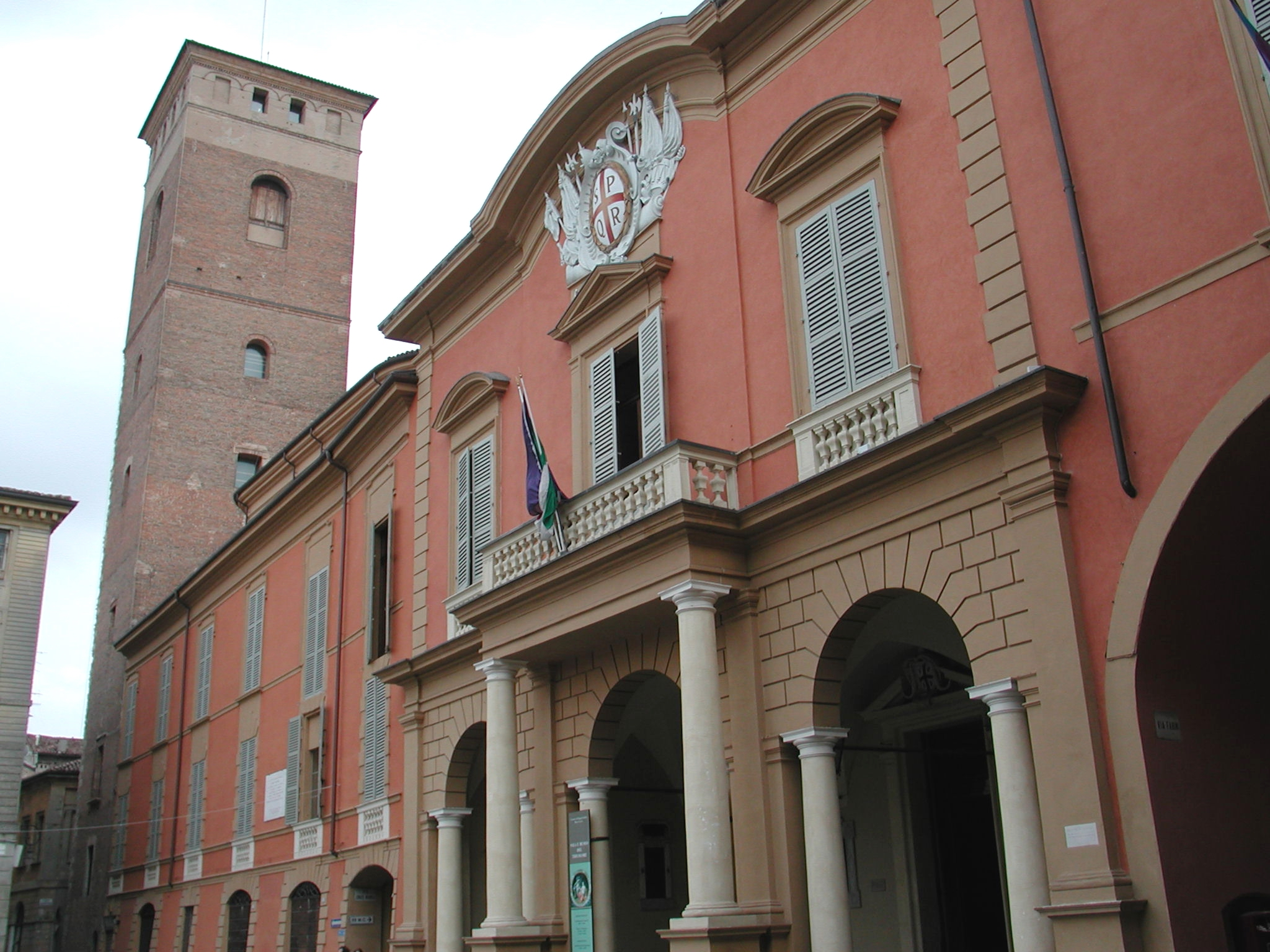
The palace of town hall of Reggio Emilia

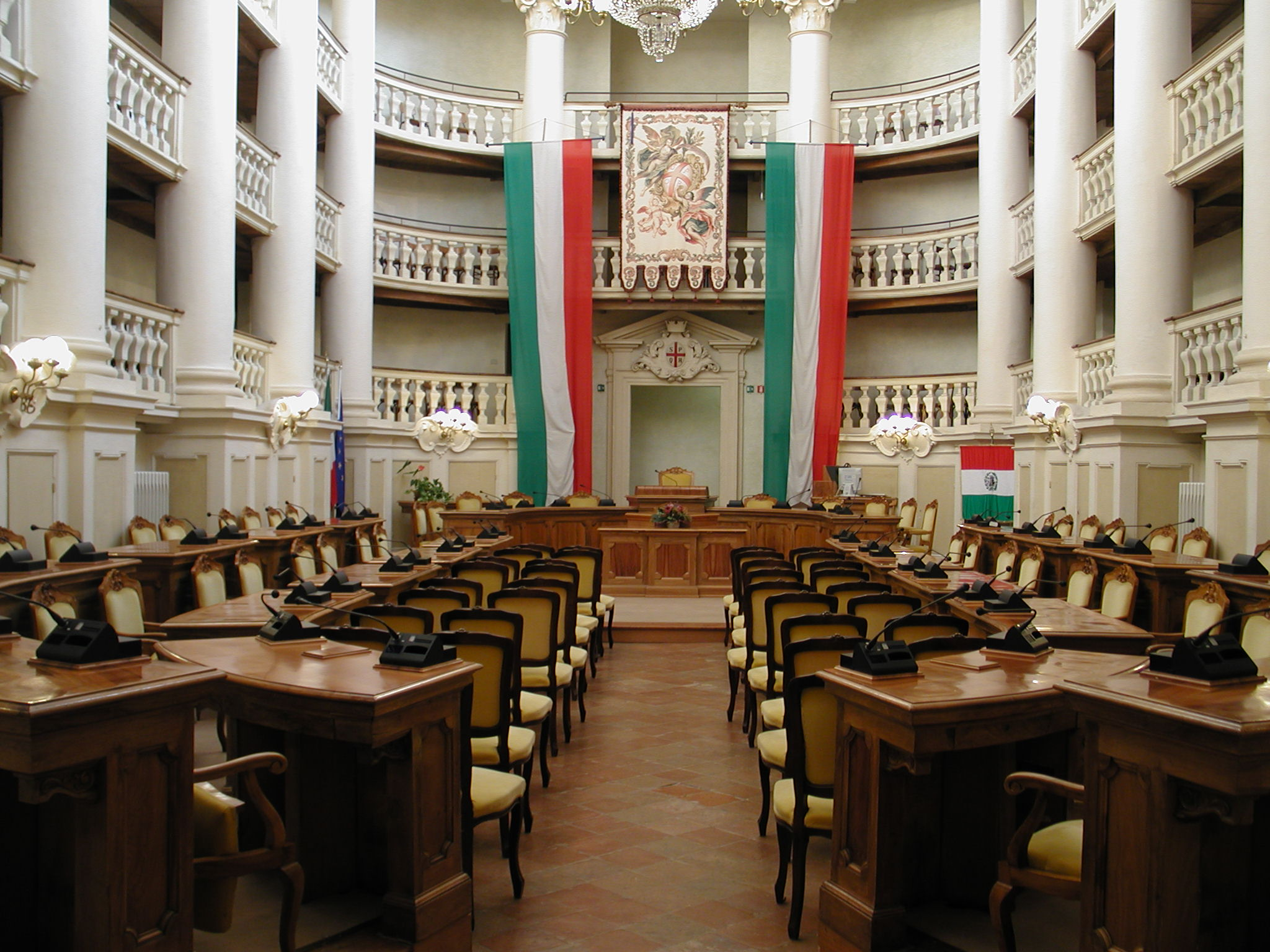
Detail of the municipal council chairs in the Sala del Tricolore

=== The palace ===
The Sala del Tricolore is located within the town hall of Reggio Emilia. The palace was built between 1414 and 1417, and began use as a meeting room of the municipal council of Reggio Emilia in 1434. The room was enlarged in 1461 with the construction of the wing towards the modern via Farini and via Croce Bianca; this portion of the building also had an external loggia. In the following years, the building was enlarged again. In 1583, Prospero Pacchioni designed and carried out his complete renovation. The building's facade was built in 1774 from a design by Ludovico Bolognini.

The hall is located in Piazza Prampolini, near the Reggio Emilia Cathedral. The façade is characterized by the presence of a large portico with three arches which are supported by coupled pillars. Just under the eaves of the main facade is the coat of arms of the municipality of Reggio Emilia. Some halls of the building are decorated with frescoes made in the 18th century and are enriched by paintings dating back to the 19th century.

=== The Sala del Tricolore ===
The room looks like an elliptical room, surrounded by three rows of balconies. There is a large chandelier that illuminates a neoclassical architectural style environment; the latter is characterized by columns with Corinthian capitals on top.

The hall has the function of council chamber of the municipality of Reggio Emilia, and is therefore used for meetings of the municipal council of the city. The hall also houses the civic gonfalone of the municipality of Reggio Emilia.

The hall is also used for cultural events, conferences and weddings, as well as for the annual commemorative ceremony for the anniversary of the birth of the Italian national flag, which takes place every January 7 on the occasion of the Tricolour Day in the presence of the most important offices of the Italian Republic.

On March 16, 2015, the Sala del Tricolore hosted a youth political event for Emilia-Romagna and the city; the opening ceremony of the XV Regional Session of the Model European Parliament hosted delegations from the host city, Ferrara, Mirandola, Modena, Carpi, Cento and Prato. Mayor Luca Vecchi, the MEP president Andrea Russo, and other authorities opened the session to a full Sala del Tricolore.

== History ==
=== The origins of the Sala del Tricolore ===
The origins of the hall date back to 1768, when the Duke of Modena and Reggio Francesco III d'Este decided to have a central state archive built that should have kept all the documents of the Duchy of Modena and Reggio. The architect's choice to entrust the drafting of the project and the construction of the new hall fell on Lodovico Bolognini, who then carried out the work from 1772 to 1785.

During the construction from 1773 to 1774, Giovanni Benassi, a court carpenter, always under the supervision of Bolognini, built a wooden model of the hall which lacked, compared to the modern version, the balconies. Instead, shelving was provided for archiving documents, which were accessed via wooden ramparts.

Shortly after the end of the construction, it was decided not to use it as an archive because it was thought the large quantity of documents could have caused a vast fire, with all the consequences of the case. In order to decide the intended use of the hall, the ducal archive was rejected, and a commission was established. This consultation proposed, among other things, its splitting up into several rooms to be used as offices, but the duke opposed this and postponed the decision.

=== The birth of the flag of Italy ===
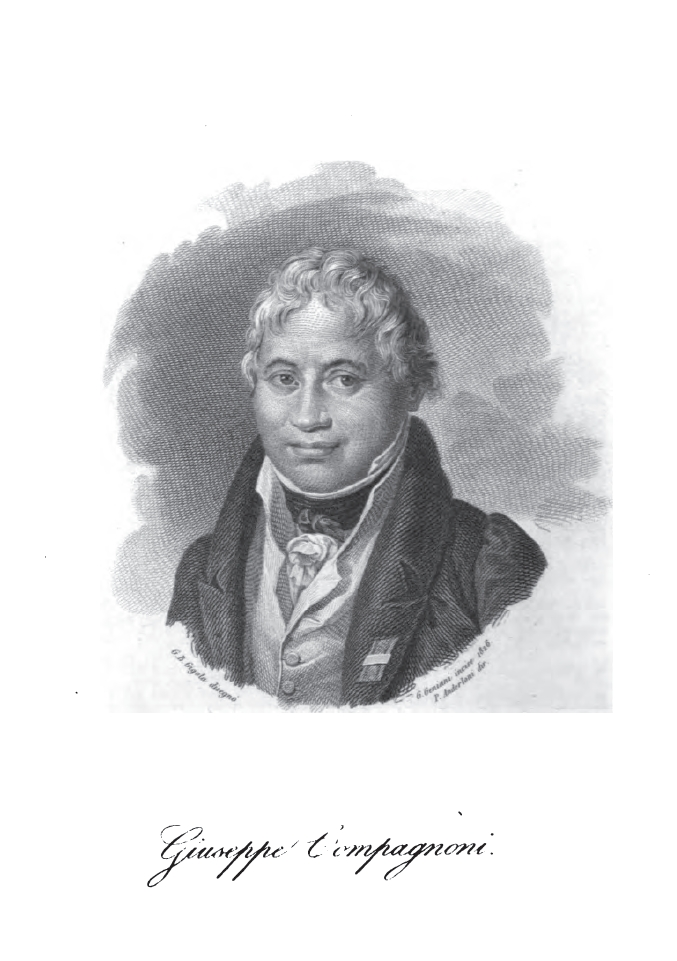
Giuseppe Compagnoni, the "father of the Italian flag"

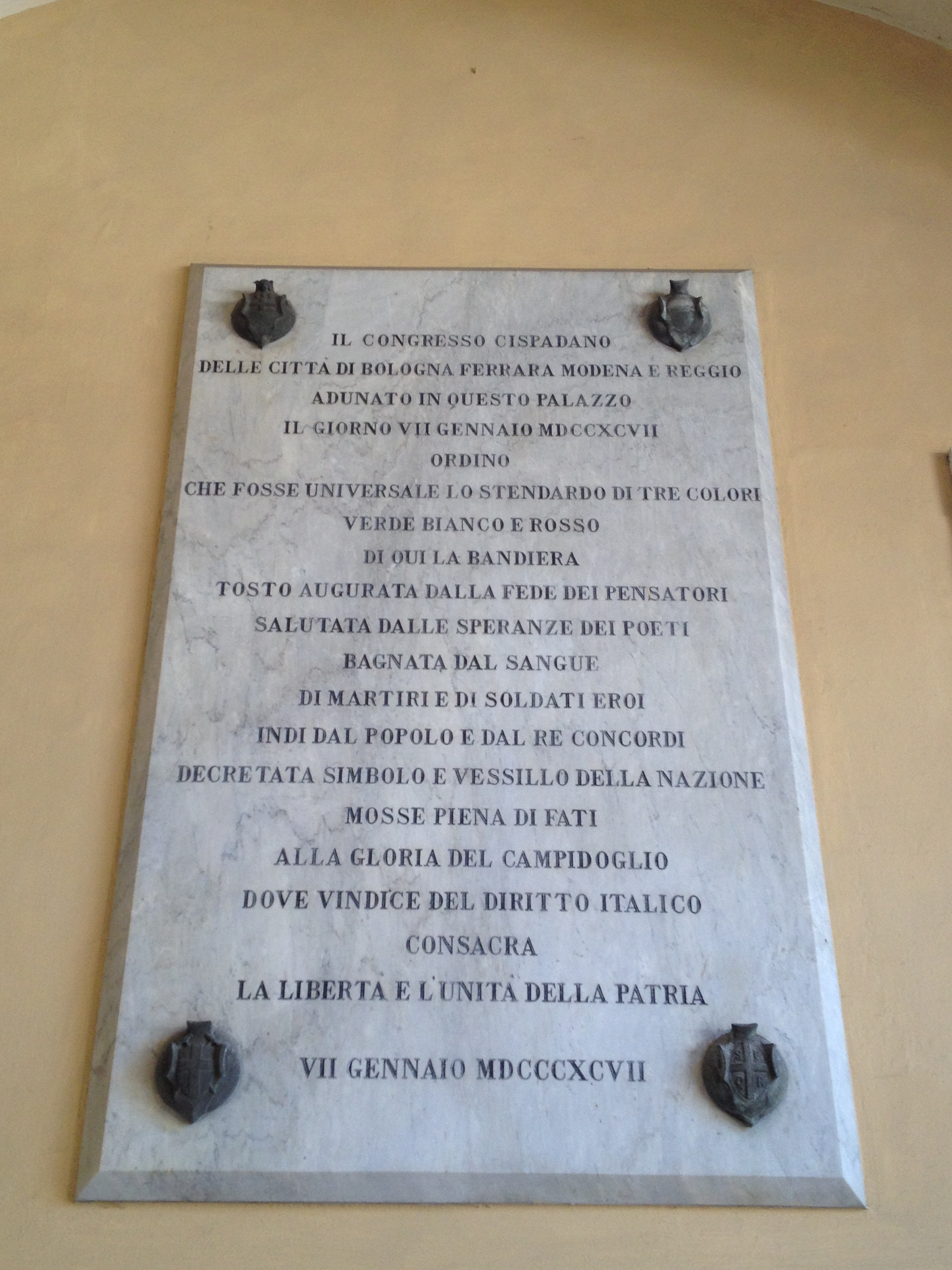
The commemorative plaque placed in the atrium of the town hall of Reggio Emilia on the occasion of the centenary of the flag of Italy

With the invasion of Napoleon's troops, the Duke of Modena and Reggio Francesco III d'Este fled and the Reggian Republic was proclaimed (26 August 1796). At the same time the Civic Guard of the city of Reggio was constituted and this military formation, aided by a small group of French grenadiers, defeated a squad of 150 Austrian soldiers at Montechiarugolo on 4 October 1796. The victory was important — both from a political and symbolic point of view — that Napoleon made an official commendation to the Reggio soldiers who were the protagonists of the battle. For the armed clash of Montechiarugolo, Napoleon defined the city of Reggio Emilia as:

[...] "[Reggio Emilia is] the most mature Italian city for freedom" [...]

— Napoleon

Moreover, in Reggio Emilia, in August 1796, one of the first liberty pole had been planted. This event, which arose from a revolt against the ducal government on 20 August 1796 in Reggio, contributed, together with the events linked to the battle of Montechiarugolo, to the decision to choose Reggio Emilia as the venue for the cispadane congress, the assembly that then led to the birth of the flag of Italy.

As a symbolic recognition of the Montechiarugolo clash, and for the event related to the tree of liberty, Napoleon suggested to the deputies of the Cispadan cities (Reggio, Modena, Bologna and Ferrara) to gather for their first congress assembly on 27 December 1796 in Reggio Emilia.

The proposal was followed despite controversy with the other cities of Emilia, which wanted the assembly organized in their own municipality; the congress of 27 December took place then in the hall of the Reggio town hall designed by Bolognini which was to house the archive of the former duchy. Here, 110 delegates chaired by Carlo Facci approved the constitutional charter of the Cispadane Republic, including the territories of Bologna, Ferrara, Modena and Reggio Emilia. For this reason, the hall of the Bolognini was renamed "centumvirate congress hall" or "patriotic hall".

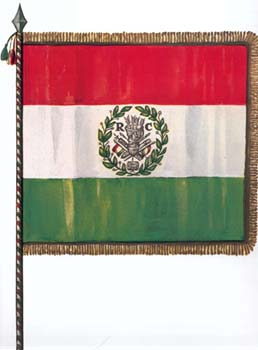
The flag of the Cispadane Republic

In subsequent meetings, which always took place in the "hall of the congress centumvirate" of Reggio, many decisions were decreed and formalized, including the choice of the emblem of the newly formed republic. To put forward the proposal for the adoption of a green, white and red national flag was Giuseppe Compagnoni — who for this reason is remembered as the "father of the Italian flag" — in the XIV session of the congress cispadano of 7 January 1797. The adoption decree states:

[...] From the minutes of the XIV Session of the Cispadan Congress: Reggio Emilia, 7 January 1797, 11 am. Patriotic Hall. The participants are 100, deputies of the populations of Bologna, Ferrara, Modena and Reggio Emilia. Giuseppe Compagnoni also motioned that the standard or Cispadan Flag of three colors, Green, White and Red, should be rendered Universal and that these three colors should also be used in the Cispadan Cockade, which should be worn by everyone. It is decreed. [...]

— Decree of adoption of the tricolor flag by the Cispadane Republic

The final choice of a green, white and red flag was not without a prior discussion. The Italian Jacobins would have favored the blue of the French flag, while the members of the papacy would have preferred the yellow of the Papal States' banner. There were no disputes on the white and the red. Finally, the discussion on the third color focused on green, which was later approved as a compromise solution. The choice of green was most probably inspired by the tricolor green, white and red military flag of the Lombard Legion, the first Italian military department to equip itself, as a banner, with an Italian tricolor flag.

The congress decision to adopt a green, white and red tricolour flag was then greeted by a jubilant atmosphere, such was the enthusiasm of the delegates, and by a peal of applause. For the first time, the Italian flag officially became the national flag of a sovereign state, disengaging itself from the local military and civic meaning; this adoption the Italian flag therefore assumed an important political value. On the basis of this event, the "centumvirate congress hall" of Reggio was later renamed "Sala del Tricolore".

In the assembly of 21 January, which was instead convened in Modena, the adoption of the Tricolor was confirmed. The flag of the Cispadane Republic was in horizontal bands with the top red, the white in the center and the green at the bottom. In the center was also the emblem of the republic, while on the sides the letters "R" and "C" were shown, the initials of the two words that form the name of the "Repubblica Cispadana".

== Ceremonial use ==
The hall continues to host state ceremonies associated with the Italian flag. During celebrations for the 150th anniversary of Italian unification in January 2011, President Giorgio Napolitano attended a ceremony there where reproductions of the first Tricolor were presented to Italian mayors and copies of the Constitution were given to students. A comparable ceremony was held in the hall for the flag's 220th anniversary in January 2017, when students received copies of the Constitution and the flag.

== See also ==
- Flag of Italy
- Flags of Napoleonic Italy
- National symbols of Italy
- Tricolour Day
