= National Unity and Armed Forces Day =

Italian national day

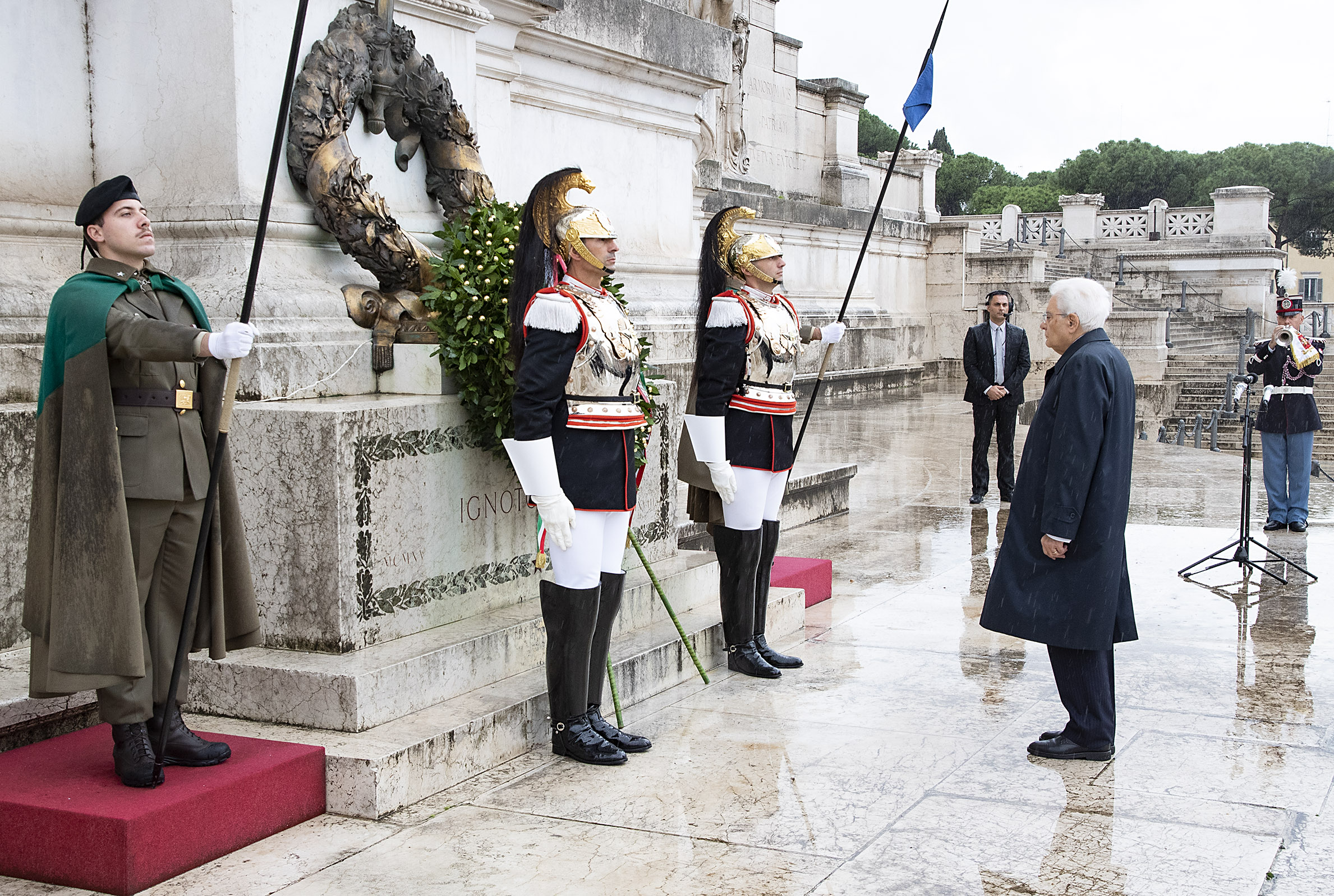
- President of Italy Sergio Mattarella paying homage to the Italian Unknown Soldier at Altare della Patria in Rome on 4 November 2022
- Official name: Italian: Giornata dell'Unità Nazionale e delle Forze Armate
- Observed by: Italy
- Type: National
- Significance: Victory of Italy in the First World War and completion of national unity
- Date: 4 November
- Next time: 4 November 2026
- Frequency: Annual
- First time: 4 November 1919; 106 years ago
- Related to: Tricolour Day (7 January); National Memorial Day of the Exiles and Foibe (10 February); Anniversary of the Unification of Italy (17 March); Anniversary of the Liberation (25 April); Festa della Repubblica (2 June)

National Unity and Armed Forces Day (Italian: Giornata dell’Unità Nazionale e delle Forze Armate) is an Italian national day since 1919 which commemorates the victory in World War I, a war event considered the completion of the process of unification of Italy. It is celebrated every 4 November, which is the anniversary of the armistice of Villa Giusti becoming effective in 1918 and ending the Italian front in victory against Austria-Hungary.

== History ==
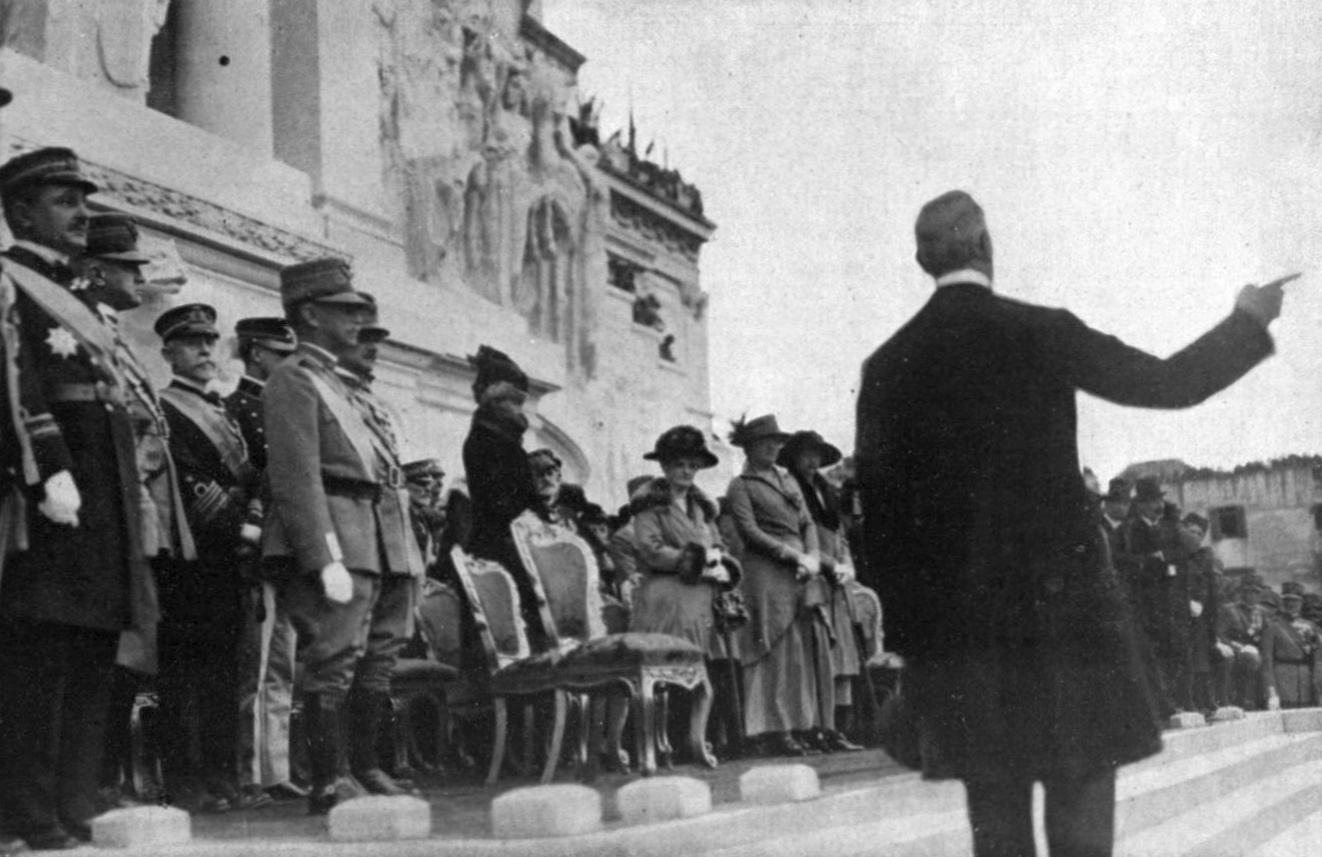
Celebrations held for 4 November at Altare della Patria in Rome (1920)

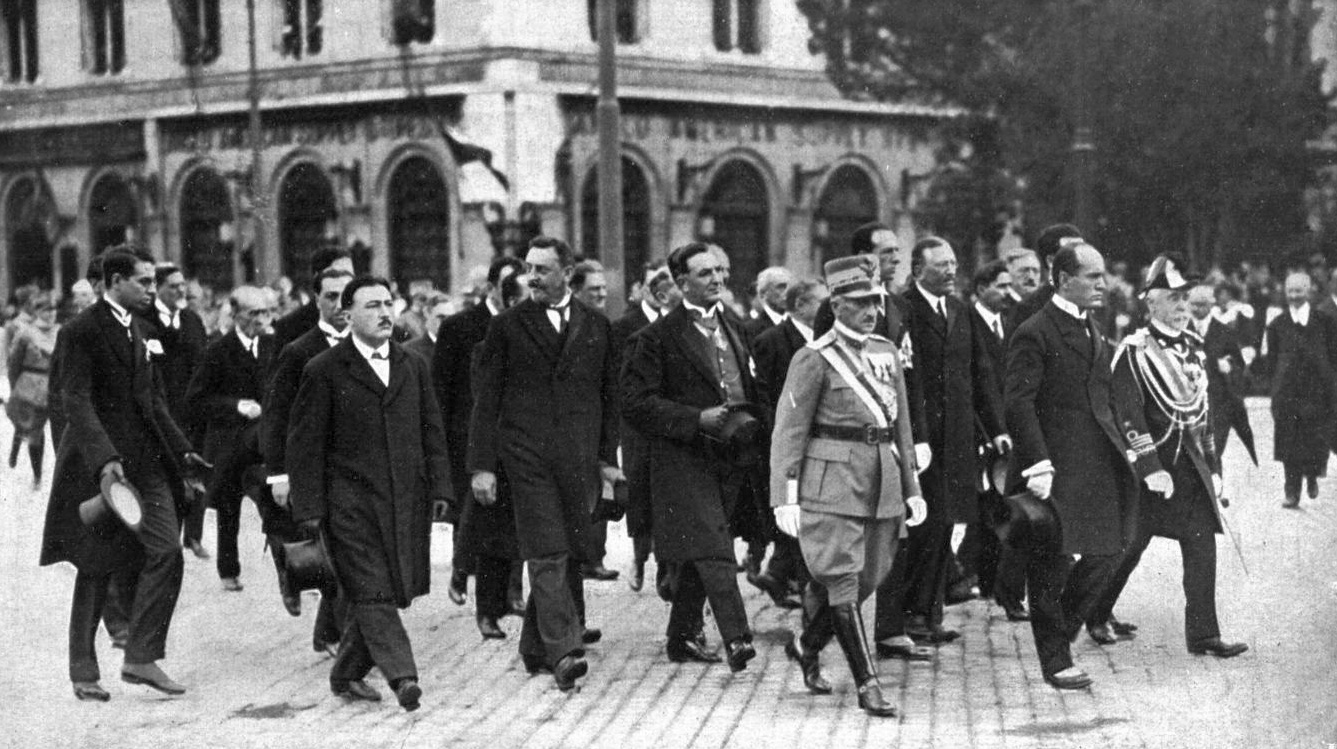
Celebrations for National Unity and Armed Forces Day in Rome on 4 November 1922

Italy entered the First World War in 1915 with the aim of completing national unity by annexing the "irredent lands" of Trento and Trieste: for this reason, the Italian intervention in the First World War is also considered the Fourth Italian War of Independence, in a historiographical perspective that identifies in the latter the conclusion of the unification of Italy, whose military actions began during the revolutions of 1848 with the First Italian War of Independence.

Tha Armistice (4 November 1918) and the Paris Peace Conference in 1919 (followed by the treaties of Saint-Germain-en-Laye and Rapallo) allowed the annexation of Trento and Trieste and thus completed national unification; in addition, Italy also annexed South Tyrol, the Julian March, Istria, Kvarner as well as the Dalmatian city of Zara; the subsequent Treaty of Rome (1924) led to the annexation of the city of Fiume to Italy.

Established in 1919, 4 November is the only Italian national holiday which has gone through decades of Italian history: from the liberal period to fascist and republican Italy. In 1921, during the National Unity and Armed Forces Day, the Italian Unknown Soldier (Milite Ignoto) was solemnly buried at the Altare della Patria in Rome.

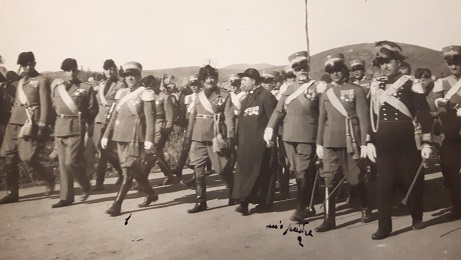
4 November commemoration in Iglesias (1932)

In 1922, shortly after the march on Rome, the holiday changed its name to Anniversario della Vittoria (Victory Anniversary) to emphasize Italian military power, while after the end of World War II, in 1949, the original meaning was restored, becoming the celebration of Italian armed forces and the achievement of Italian Unity.

With the birth of the Italian Republic in 1946, the national anthem was changed: the Marcia Reale was replaced by Il Canto degli Italiani, which was officially played for the first time as the Italian national anthem on the occasion of the National Unity and Armed Forces Day on 4 November 1946.

4 November was a holiday until 1976. From 1977, during the austerity caused by the 1973 oil crisis, it became a moveable feast according to the calendar reform of national holidays introduced by law n. 54 of 5 March 1977, and celebrations occurred every first Sunday of November.

During the 1980s and 1990s, its importance declined but in the 2000s, thanks to the impulse given by former president of the republic Carlo Azeglio Ciampi, who has been a main protagonist of a general valorization of Italian national symbols, the holiday gained more widespread celebrations.

== Celebration ==
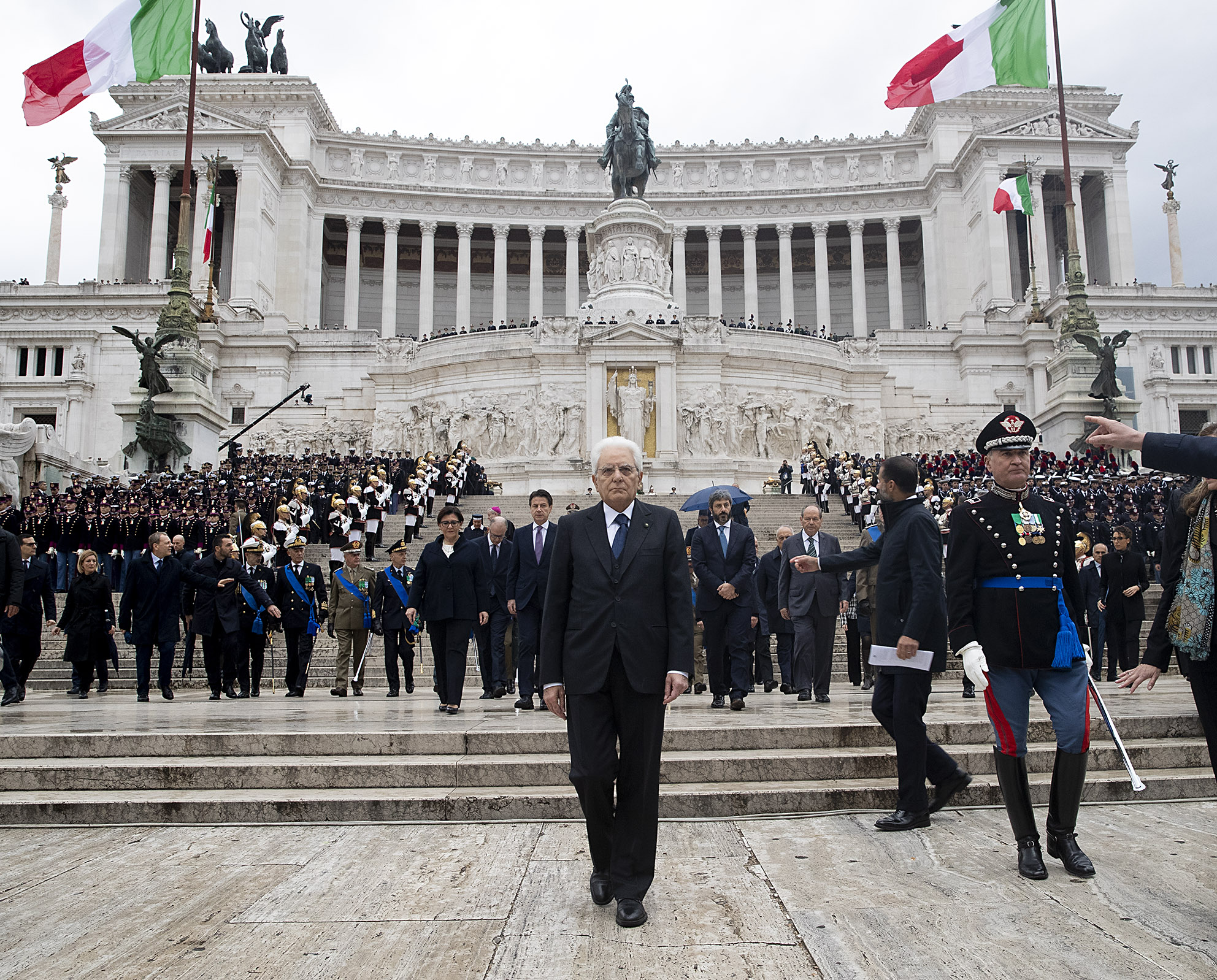
Celebrations for National Unity and Armed Forces Day on 4 November 2018 at Altare della Patria in Rome on the occasion of the centenary of the end of World War I

On 4 November, and the days shortly before, the President of Italy and other important officers of the State pay homage to the Italian Unknown Soldier (Milite Ignoto), buried in the Altare della Patria in Rome, visit the Redipuglia War Memorial, where the remains of 100,000 Italian soldiers who died in the First World War are buried, as well as Vittorio Veneto, where there occurred the last and decisive battle between the Royal Italian Army and the Austro-Hungarian Army.

The Italian President and Minister of Defence send to the Italian Armed Forces a message of greeting and gratitude in the name of the whole country. 4 November is celebrated also in other institutional offices like Regions, Provinces and Comuni.

During the national holiday, there is the change of guards, at the Quirinal Palace, with Corazzieri and the fanfare of 4th Carabinieri Cavalry Regiment in high uniform. This rite occurs only in other two occasions, during celebrations of Tricolour Day (7 January) and Republic Day (2 June).

The Italian Army Forces usually open the barracks to the public and allow visits to the naval military units. Arms showings and exhibitions about WWI are often held inside barracks. There are often sport demonstrations and exercise carried out by soldiers.

In squares of the main Italian cities, concerts are held by military bands, as well as other celebrations in front of the Monument to the fallen situated in each Commune.

== Controversies ==
During the protests of 1968, Armed Forces Day became an object of protest and dissent by different political groups.

Especially in the second half of the 1960s and the first of the 1970s, on 4 November the radical movement, far-left groups and "dissident Catholics" began protests to ask for recognition of a right to conscientious objection. They also criticised the overall military institutions.

Sometimes protests were carried on by the distribution of leaflets and posting of posters against armed forces. Protesters were often pursued for offences to the Army's honour and prestige and for inciting soldiers to insubordination.

== See also ==
- Armistice of Villa Giusti
- Bollettino della Vittoria
- Bollettino della Vittoria Navale
- Italian Armed Forces
- Italian Front (WWI)
- World War I
- Public holidays in Italy
- Anniversary of the Unification of Italy
- Anniversary of the Liberation
- Festa della Repubblica
- National Memorial Day of the Exiles and Foibe
- Tricolour Day
