= Giuseppe Compagnoni =

Italian constitutionalist, writer, and journalist (1754–1833)

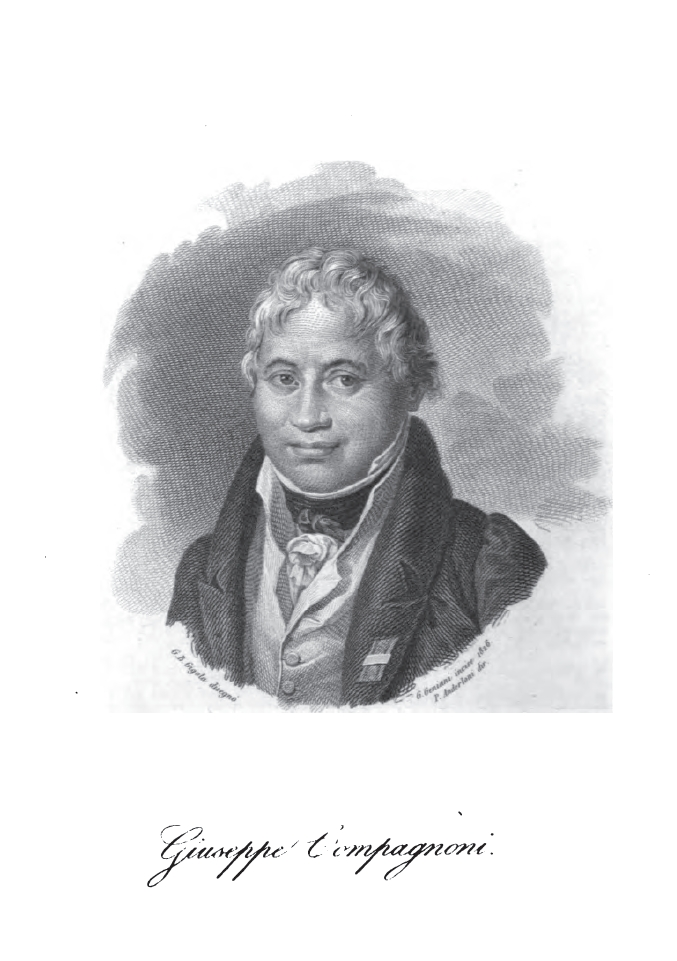
Compagnoni in 1824

Marco Giuseppe Compagnoni (3 March 1754 – 29 December 1833) was an Italian constitutionalist, writer, and journalist. He is best known as the "father of the Italian flag", since he was the first to propose the official use of the Italian tricolour for the flag of a sovereign Italian state, the Cispadane Republic, on 7 January 1797.

== Biography ==
Son of Giovanni Compagnoni and Domenica Ettorri, he was born on 3 March 1754 into one of the best families of the local patriciate in Lugo. The parents lived in Casa Cavadini, on the street De 'Brozzi (San Vitale) not far from the Sanctuary of the Madonna del Mulino. Giuseppe was sent to study as a child, distinguishing himself in philosophy and theology and graduating cum laude in 1778 at the college of Dominicans in the territory. He was urged by the family to take the vows. After ordination to the priesthood, Compagnoni was a candidate for the canonical chapter of the Collegiate Lughese, but was rejected. After a few years of priesthood, he left the cassock.

In 1781, Compagnoni published a Ragionamento parentetico addressed to the people of the various towns of Romagna affected by the earthquake of that year. It is probably his first printed work in Italian. In 1782, one of his poems, La Fiera di Sinigaglia o sia saggio sul commercio, signed with the pseudonym Ligofilo (a term he himself coined on the Greek assonance, "lover of reading") was reviewed by the Bologna magazine "Memorie Enciclopediche", a bibliographic information journal created the previous year. Compagnoni came into contact with the director, the lawyer Giovanni Ristori, and in a short time he started an external collaboration with the newspaper. The magazine contained (seven pages out of eight) reviews of works in Italian just published. Ristori appreciated the encyclopedic culture of the Lughese; just as he immediately liked Compagnoni's reviews, written with an ironic and sharp style at the same time.

From 1784, Compagnoni appeared in the list of the fixed collaborators of "Memorie", with the responsibility of the reviews in the field of "metaphysics". In 1785 he found the opportunity to leave his native Lugo, where he could no longer find strong stimuli. In May, Ristori asked him to replace it temporarily as head of the newspaper. The proposal was accepted. In Bologna Compagnoni came into contact with important personalities and men of letters of the city. He continued to work hard at the newspaper, which in that same year had changed its name to "Giornale Enciclopedico". His period of supply to the direction ended at the end of June 1786, when he returned the task to Ristori. Later he sought a new job suited to his social status. He moved to Ferrara, where he entered service as secretary of the Bentivoglio d'Aragona family (October 1786).

In 1787, Ristori, tired of the continuous disputes with the pontifical censorship, closed the newspaper and moved to the Republic of Venice. Shortly afterwards also Compagnoni arrived in the capital of the Serenissima, always in the wake of the Bentivoglio family. He collaborated with Il Giornalista veneto, then went on to direct Notizie del mondo (1789–1794), published by the publisher Antonio Graziosi. It was his first owner. In cassock Compagnoni taught as a repeater in the after-school to the College of the Villa dei Bentivoglio, called "Viola". Here he met the patriots Giovanni Battista De Rolandis and Luigi Zamboni who then organized a revolt starring the Italian tricolor cockade. During the decade of his stay in the lagoon city – fundamental for his intellectual growth – he knew several prominent personalities, such as Vincenzo Dandolo (with whom he started a partnership that lasted until the death of the Venetian intellectual, in the 1820s), Antonio Fortunato Stella and Count Alessandro Pepoli, at whose printing house Mercury was printed. In 1794, Compagnoni abjured the priestly vows in protest against the torture inflicted by the Inquisition Court on the detainees. In Venice he founded his own newspaper, the monthly Mercurio d'Italia (January 1796). The magazine had both a historical-political aspect and a scientific-literary guise. In fact, two versions came out (both about seventy pages), the Mercurio d'Italia storico-politico and the Mercurio d'Italia storico-letterario.

In October 1796, on the wave of the upheavals that the peninsula were crossing after the French invasion, he left Venice for Ferrara. Embraced Enlightenment ideas, he was general secretary of the Cispadane Republic. Elected to the Congress of Reggio Emilia, he presented numerous theses, including some concerning taxes and education. On 7 January 1797 he proposed for the first time the adoption of a green, white and red national flag in the 14th session of the Cispadan congress which took place in a hall of the city's town hall, called the "centumvirate congress hall" and later renamed Sala del Tricolore. The adoption decree states:

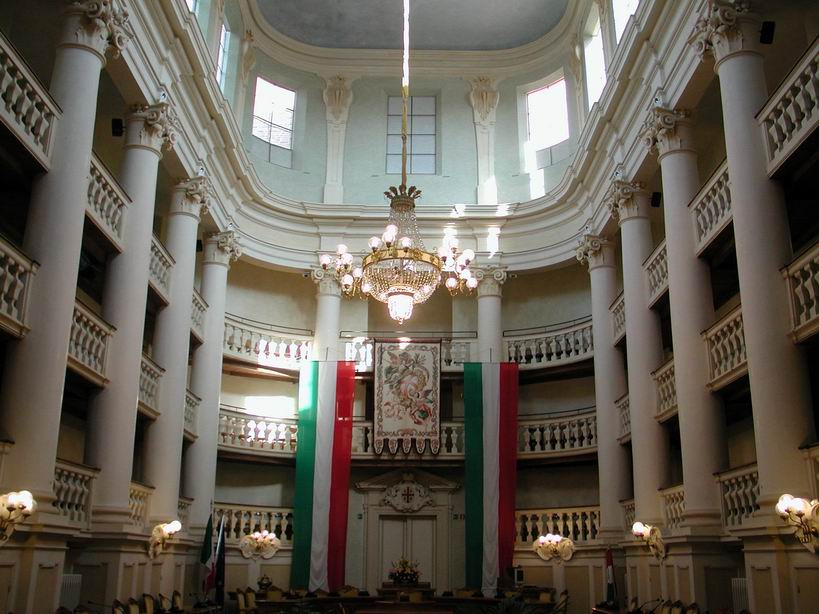
The 18th-century Sala del Tricolore, which later became the council hall of the municipality of Reggio Emilia, where the Italian flag was born.

... From the minutes of the XIV Session of the Cispadan Congress: Reggio Emilia, 7 January 1797, 11 am. Patriotic Hall. The participants are 100, deputies of the populations of Bologna, Ferrara, Modena and Reggio Emilia. Giuseppe Compagnoni also motioned that the standard or Cispadan Flag of three colors, Green, White and Red, should be rendered Universal and that these three colors should also be used in the Cispadan Cockade, which should be worn by everyone. It is decreed. ...

— Decree of adoption of the tricolor flag by the Cispadane Republic

The congress's decision to adopt a green, white and red tricolor flag was then also greeted by a jubilant atmosphere, so much was the enthusiasm of the delegates, and by bursts of applause. For the first time, the city of ducal states for centuries enemies, they identify themselves as one people and a common identity symbol: the tricolor flag. For the first time the Italian flag officially became the national flag of a sovereign state, disengaging itself from the local military and civic meaning: with this adoption the Italian flag therefore assumed an important political value. Compagnoni also gave an important speech on the need to separate civil and ecclesiastical power on the following 25 January. In the same year, the Cispadan administration entrusted him, at the University of Ferrara, with the first chair in constitutional law in Europe.

Following the merger between the Cispadana and the Cisalpina into a single entity, Compagnoni moved to Milan, where he held various institutional offices – first deputy and then member of the Cassation – until the Austrians returned in 1799. In the Lombard capital he founded a new newspaper, the Monitore Cisalpino (May 1798). Compagnoni obtained a public grant of 2,000 lire. His newspaper was intended to spread the thought of the Directory in Italy. Within the first year of life Compagnoni sold the head to Count Luigi Bossi and entered service as an official of the Cisalpine administration.

Sheltered in Paris due to the Austro-Russian invasion led by General Suvorov (1799), he returned to the Lombard capital immediately after the French victory at Battle of Marengo (1800). He became a career official in the Cisalpine, then became the Italian Republic and later the Kingdom of Italy, he held – among others – the position of secretary of the Council of State. On the initiative of Bonaparte, he was awarded the Iron Crown, the highest civil honor. At the fall of Napoleon (1814), Compagnoni had to leave the state offices assumed during the Kingdom of Italy. He devoted himself to the activity of scholar and polygraph, with which he supplemented the pension check (the Habsburg administration, however, did not recognize him the pensions he was entitled to for the positions he held in the previous fifteen years). He collaborated mainly with the printers Antonio Fortunato Stella and Giambattista Sonzogno. Despite some frictions with the new regime, he also collaborated with pro-Austrian magazines, such as the "Biblioteca Italiana", while never denying his political belief. He lived the rest of his life in Milan, which became his adopted homeland, where he died on 29 December 1833.
