= Lombard Legion =

Military unit of the Army of Italy

- Italian: Legione Lombarda; Lombard: Legion Lombarda
- Active: 1796–1799
- Country: Repubblica Cisalpina; French First Republic
- Part of: Army of Italy
- Engagements: French Revolutionary Wars; War of the First Coalition; Battle of Arcole

Commanders
- Notable commanders: Alessandro Trivulzi

Military standard of the Legion's Cacciatori a Cavallo detachment

The Lombard Legion (Italian: Legione Lombarda; Lombard: Legion Lombarda) was a military unit of the Cisalpine Republic which existed from 1796 until the Republic's fall in 1799; but despite the downfall of this sister republic, the Cisalpine troops continued to serve the French First Republic. The Lombard Legion was the first Italian military department to equip itself, as a banner, with an Italian tricolor flag.

== History ==
It was formed on 8 October 1796 by Napoleon Bonaparte, then commander of the Armee d'Italie. Its theoretical full strength was 3740 men made up of a hussar company, an artillery company and seven 500-man infantry cohorts (3 from Milan, 1 from Cremona and Casalmaggiore, 1 from Lodi and Pavia, 1 from Como and 1 miscellaneous cohort of Italian nationalists, mainly from the Papal States and the Kingdom of Sicily). It was commanded by the former Milanese nobleman, general Alessandro Trivulzio and included Ugo Foscolo and Vincenzo Cuoco among its soldiers. 2720 had been recruited by 18 October and on 6 November 1796 it and several other units were ceremonially presented with their standards in the piazza outside Milan Cathedral - they were in red, white and green, which would become the national colours of Italy. The Lombard Legion was the first Italian military department to equip itself, as a banner, with a tricolor flag. It fought at the Battle of Arcole on 15 November 1796 and then against papal forces on the river Senio. The Legion's fourth cohort joined Cisalpine troops to put down insurrections at Pesaro then at Urbino.

By February 1797 it was stationed in Brescia and on 26 February 1797 it was reorganised into two demi-brigades of three cohorts, an artillery company and a hussar company and at the end of that year the Cisapadane Legion merged into it – that unit had been made up of 6 cohorts of 1,000 men and became the Lombard Legion's third demi-brigade. By then the Legion had been moved to Verona in support of French forces fighting in the Veneto before being divided up between Corfu, Peschiera and Friuli – the elements of the Legion still in Italy on the treaty of Campo Formio of 17 October 1797 returned to Lombardy.

The Lombard Legion became part of the Cisalpine Army in April 1798, then made up of eight demi-brigades, though this had fallen to four by the following November. The Legion's fourth cohort was attached to General Jean Étienne Championnet's army to fight in Naples in 1798 and the following year the Legion's second demi-brigade formed part of the army of Rome sent to attack the Kingdom of Naples under General Domenico Pino.

It broke up after the Republic's fall in 1799, but some survivors from the unit moved to France, where they joined veterans from the armed forces of the Roman Republic and the Neapolitan Republic to form the Italic Legion (Legione Italica), also known as the Italian Legion (Legione Italica). This formed part of Bonaparte's reserve force for the second Italian campaign and fought the Austrians at Lecco.
