= National Library Service of Italy =

The National Library Service of Italy (Italian: Servizio bibliotecario nazionale, SBN) is a Ministry of Cultural Heritage and Activities promoted network of Italian libraries, in collaboration with Regions and Universities, and coordinated by the Central Institute for the Union Catalogue of Italian Libraries and Bibliographic Information (Italian: Istituto centrale per il catalogo unico delle biblioteche italiane e per le informazioni bibliografiche, ICCU).

== History ==
The project for the National Library System is born with the goal of overcoming the fragmentation of, and fostering the co-operation among, Italian library structures, on the impulse of the National Conference of Italian Libraries held in Rome from 22 to 24 January 1979. It was designed by Angela Vinay (Director of ICCU) and Michel Boisset (Director of the European University Institute Library), in collaboration with a group of librarians and computer scientists. The planning phase was officially started on 4 April 1980, with the establishment of an experts' commission made up of representatives from the Ministry of Cultural Heritage and Activities (MCHA), the ICCU, the National Central Library of Florence, the European University Institute and the National Research Council.

The final document produced by the Commission proposed the creation of the service, articulated in:

- a union catalogue of library resources, produced by the integrated set of local catalogues;
- a national bibliographic database, ensuring quality, completeness and consistency of bibliographic description;
- a national service for document access.

In 1982 the project was presented by Angela Vinay to the library community on the occasion of the 30th Congress of the Italian Libraries Association held in Giardini-Naxos on 21–24 November 1982. In 1984, MCHA subscribed a protocol of understanding with Regions for the development of the SBN project.

In 1985, the first two Poles were established, those of the National Central Libraries of Rome and Florence. From 1987 to 1990, the project "Library Heritage System" (Italian: Sistema beni librari) made it possible to recover the catalogues of the National Italian Bibliography (Bibliografia nazionale italiana, BNI), the Bulletin of Foreign Modern Works (Bollettino delle opere moderne straniere, BOMS) and other catalogues related to music and Southern Italy-theme funds, which came to constitute the first substantial nucleus of the catalogue. In 1992, the protocol of understanding MCHA-Regions was extended to the Ministry of University and Scientific and Technological Research involving many university libraries in the project. In addition, through the connection of more Poles to the SBN network, the national network was officially activated.

In 1996 a feasibility study was started to create a single database, integrating the previous ones related to modern books, ancient books and music, and enable the management of graphic and cartographic material, also allowing a certain degree of interoperability with programs not developed within SBN.

In 2002, with the startup of the project "Evolution of the SBN Index" (Evoluzione dell'Indice SBN), a restructuring and a rationalization of the Index central database, as well as its opening to other library management systems not related to SBN, using the more widespread bibliographic formats (UNIMARC, MARC21).

== Organisation ==
The National Library Service connects state, local authorities, university and private libraries operating in different disciplinary sectors. Participating libraries are grouped in local hubs, connected in turn to the SBN Index, which contains the collective catalogue of the heritage possessed by the libraries adhering to the service. Adherence to the service implies for the library or local library hub to subscribe an agreement with ICCU, to define their respective commitments to the development of SBN and related services.

One of the fundamental functions of the National Library Service is the participatory cataloguing among adhering libraries: every bibliographic record (books, authority codes or other things) is described only once by the library or library hub which acquires it first. The other libraries merely report the record already registered within the Index in their own catalogue, only adding the indication that they also possess that given record.

However, the single hub databases only share the bibliographic description of the record, thus keeping total autonomy regarding the possibility of adding further information (such as the local position of a book, purchasing orders, more specific search keys, etc.). Libraries also have full autonomy as to organizational choices and hardware and software investments.

As of 5 November 2018 6,320 libraries (organised in 104 hubs) adhere to it, and the bibliographic database contains 17,162,840 bibliographic records, complete with 92,110,636 locations (that is, indications about the library possessing them). The collective catalogue includes documents of different types: ancient material (printed monographies from the 15th century to 1830), modern material (monographies, audio and video recordings, electronic databases, periodicals and other materials since 1831), handwritten music, printed music and libretti, graphic and cartographic material. Accesses to the catalogue pages range between 2.8 millions and 4.6 millions per month.

There are two large papal libraries, the Vatican Library in Vatican City and the Ambrosian Library in Milan.

== Services ==
=== Bibliographic search ===
Since 1997, the collective catalogue is available on line by means of the OPAC system, which over time saw the creation of various interfaces. Completing the search a set of services are available, such as for example the save of the searches made during the session, the management of favourites lists and the sending of results via e-mail.

Through the OPAC consultation is also possible:

- accessing the consultation, loan and reproduction services offered by libraries on their local OPAC's;
- accessing information related to the opening hours and the heritage possessed by the libraries taking part in SBN, thanks to the integration with the Italian Libraries Database;
- consulting the authority items of uniform authors and titles;
- accessing possible digital resources;
- viewing or downloading bibliographic records in the UNIMARC format;
- consulting also other national and international catalogues as client Z39.50.

=== Interlibrary loan ===
The National Library Service puts at disposal the Inter library loan SBN (ILL SBN), a national service of interlibrary loan and document delivery, accessible to everybody and addressed to librarians and end users.

The interlibrary loan service was at the base of the SBN project, having integrated competences and projects which had been started in November 1979 by the working group "Co-operation Experience" (Esperienza di cooperazione, ECO), later continued in the project "National Document Access Service" (Servizio nazionale di accesso ai documenti, SNADOC), started in Tuscany in the mid-1980s.

In the 2010s, the loan service can be accessed through the catalogue of the National Library Service, via the ACNP national serial catalogue (Catalogo italiano dei periodici, "Italian Union Catalogue of Serials") and the ESSPER serial catalogue (Catalogo collettivo di spogli di periodici italiani di economia, scienze sociali e storia dell'Associazione ESSPER, "Collective Catalogue of Selected Italian Periodicals of Economics, Social Sciences and History of the ESSPER Association").

== See also ==
- OPAC
- Istituto Centrale per il Catalogo Unico

== Bibliography ==
=== Books ===
- Leombroni, Claudio (2002). "Il Servizio bibliotecario nazionale. Idee, passioni, storia". In Paolo Traniello (ed.). Storia delle biblioteche in Italia, dall'Unità a oggi (in Italian). Bologna: Il Mulino. ISBN 88-15-08848-2.
- Erica Gay; Gianni Bonazzi, eds. (1993). Servizio bibliotecario nazionale, realizzazioni e prospettive, atti della 3. Conferenza nazionale per i beni librari, Torino, 26-28 aprile 1990 (in Italian). Turin: Regione Piemonte. ISBN 88-7678-082-3.
- Il Servizio Bibliotecario Nazionale (in Italian) (2nd revised and corrected ed.). Rome: Istituto centrale per il catalogo unico delle biblioteche italiane e per le informazioni bibliografiche. 1985. ISBN 88-7107-035-6.

=== Journals ===
- "Atti della Conferenza nazionale delle biblioteche italiane sul tema "per l'attuazione del sistema bibliotecario nazionale"". Accademie e biblioteche d'Italia (in Italian). 47 (1–2). Rome: Ministero della Pubblica Istruzione: 40–42. 1979.
- Giordani, I. (1939). The Work of Italian Libraries. The Library Quarterly, 9(2), 145–155.
