= Cispadane Republic =

1796–1797 French client state in northern Italy

Coordinates: 44°29′42″N 11°20′33″E

Cispadane Republic Repubblica Cispadana (Italian)
- 1796–1797
- Flag Emblem

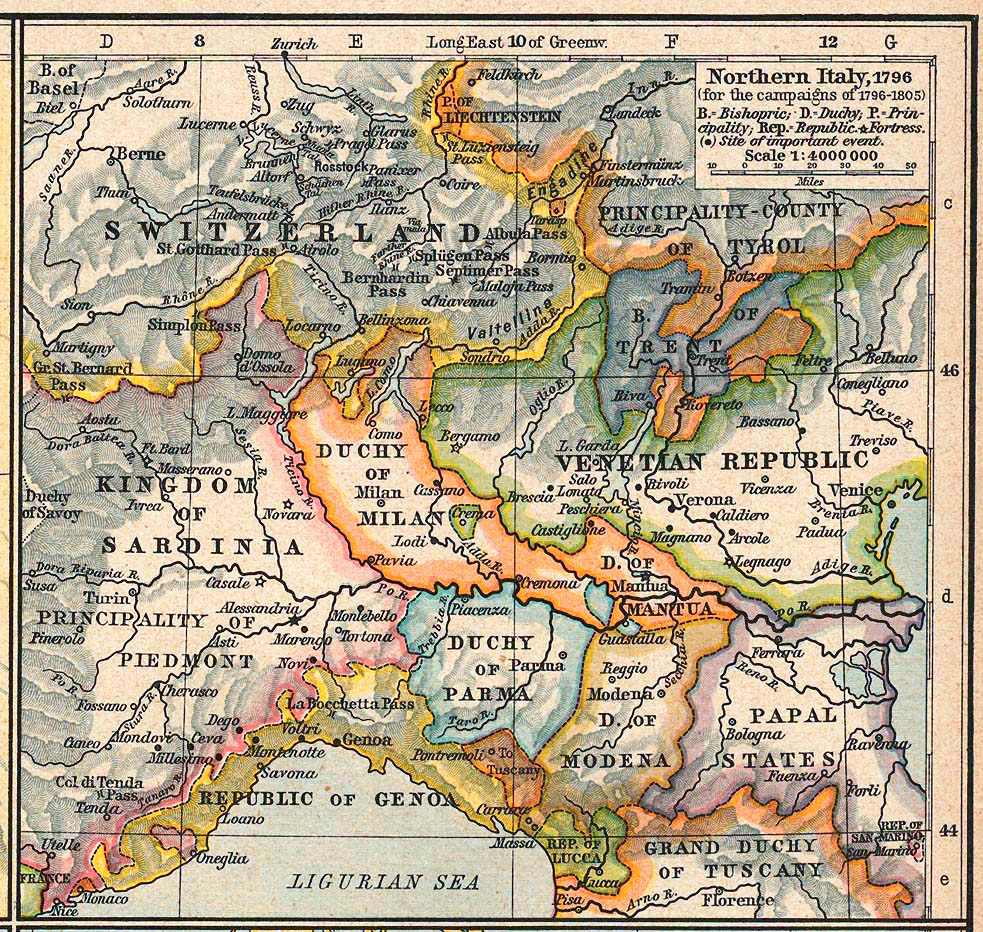
- Northern Italy in 1796. Modena and Papal Legations (all lower right) were merged into the Cispadane Republic.
- Status: Client state of France
- Capital: Bologna
- Common languages: Emilian, Romagnol, Italian
- Government: Unitary directorial republic
- Legislature: Legislative Body
  - Upper house: Council of Thirty
  - Lower house: Council of Sixty
- Historical era: Napoleonic Wars
  - Battle of Lodi: 10 May 1796
  - Treaty of Tolentino: 19 February 1797
  - Cisalpine Annexation: 29 June 1797
  - Treaty of Campo Formio: 17 October 1797
- Currency: Bolognese lira and all other old currencies
Preceded by
Duchy of Modena and Reggio
Duchy of Massa and Carrara
Papal Legations
Succeeded by
Cisalpine Republic

The Cispadane Republic (Italian: Repubblica Cispadana) was a short-lived client republic located in northern Italy, founded in 1796 with the protection of the French army, led by Napoleon Bonaparte. In the following year, it was merged with the Transpadane Republic (formerly the Duchy of Milan until 1796) to form the Cisalpine Republic. The Cispadane Republic was the first Italian sovereign state to adopt the Italian tricolour as its flag.

== History ==
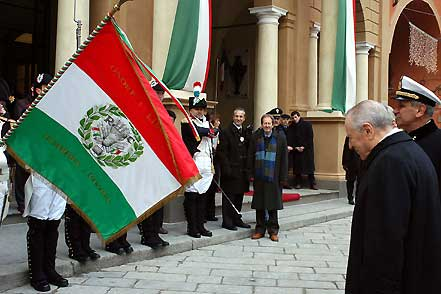
The then-president of Italy Carlo Azeglio Ciampi honors the flag of Cispadane Republic, the first Italian flag, during the Tricolour Day on 7 January 2004 in Reggio Emilia.

On 16 October 1796, a congress was held in Modena after the ruler, Duke Hercules III, had fled to Venice to escape the French advance. The congress was formed by representatives from the provinces of Modena, Bologna, Ferrara and Reggio Emilia, all located south of the Po; Cispadane indicates "on this side of (the river) Po", with the corresponding Transpadane indicating "across (the river) Po".

The congress was unofficially organized by Napoleon, whose French army had swept through northern Italy earlier in the year, and who needed to settle the situation in Italy and gather new troops for an offensive against Austria.

The congress proclaimed that the four provinces would form the Repubblica Cispadana: a civic guard, composed of mounted hunters and artillery, was formed. In the 7 January 1797 session, in Reggio Emilia, the congress decided to form a government.

The flag, the first tricolour in Italy, was a horizontal tricolour, with red (top), white and green stripes. In the centre was an emblem composed of a quiver, accolade to a war trophy, with four arrows that symbolized the four provinces forming the Republic, all within a crown of bay. The Cispadane Republic was the first Italian sovereign state to adopt the Italian tricolour as its flag.

On 29 June 1797, the Cispadane Republic united with the Transpadane Republic to form the Cisalpine Republic.

== See also ==
- Historical states of Italy
- French client republic
