= National Memorial Day of the Exiles and Foibe =

Public holiday in Italy

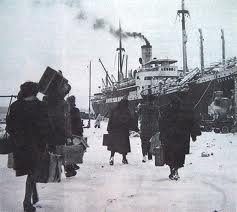
- Istrian Italians leave Pula in 1947 during the Istrian–Dalmatian exodus
- Official name: Italian: Giorno del ricordo
- Observed by: Italy
- Liturgical color: green, white and red
- Significance: Commemoration of the victims of the Foibe and the Istrian–Dalmatian exodus
- Date: 10 February
- Next time: 10 February 2027
- Frequency: annual
- First time: 10 February 2005
- Related to: Tricolour Day (7 January); Anniversary of the Unification of Italy (17 March); Anniversary of the Liberation (25 April); Festa della Repubblica (2 June); National Unity and Armed Forces Day (4 November)

National Memorial Day of the Exiles and Foibe (Italian: Giorno del ricordo, English: Day of Remembrance) is an Italian commemoration of the victims of the Foibe and the Istrian–Dalmatian exodus, which led to the emigration of hundreds of thousands (between 230,000 and 350,000) of local ethnic Italians (Istrian Italians and Dalmatian Italians) from Yugoslavia after the end of the Second World War.

The Italian Law 92 of 30 March 2004 instituted a Day of Remembrance on 10 February to commemorate the victims of Foibe and the forced exodus of nearly the entire population of Italian origin living in Dalmatia and Julian March brought about by Yugoslavia. The law also instituted a special medal to be conferred on relatives of victims.

The date of 10 February is the day on which the peace treaties of Paris were signed. These treaties transferred the previously Italian areas of Istria, Kvarner, the Dalmatian city of Zadar and most of Julian March to Yugoslavia.

== History ==
Ribbon bar medal of the Day of Remembrance awarded to relatives of victims of Foibe killings

National Memorial Day is held annually on 10 February and is observed by all Italian political parties including the President and municipal mayors. It commemorates the foibe massacres and Istrian–Dalmatian exodus. According to recent studies and a work by the historian Guido Rumici the total number of Italian victims (including people murdered during their imprisonment or deportation) ranges between 6,000 and 11,000 killed, and between 230,000 and 350,000 expelled or fled from Dalmatia, Istria and the area bordering Slovenia.

Exiles requested recognition of the Foibe for a long time but diplomatic reasons delayed progress, given Italy's peaceful relations with Yugoslavia after the Tito–Stalin split and during the rest of the Cold War. After the fall of Soviet Union and the dissolution of the Italian Communist Party in January 1991, a bill was passed. Italian deputies and senators almost unanimously voted in favour, and the law passed as number 92 on 30 March 2004.

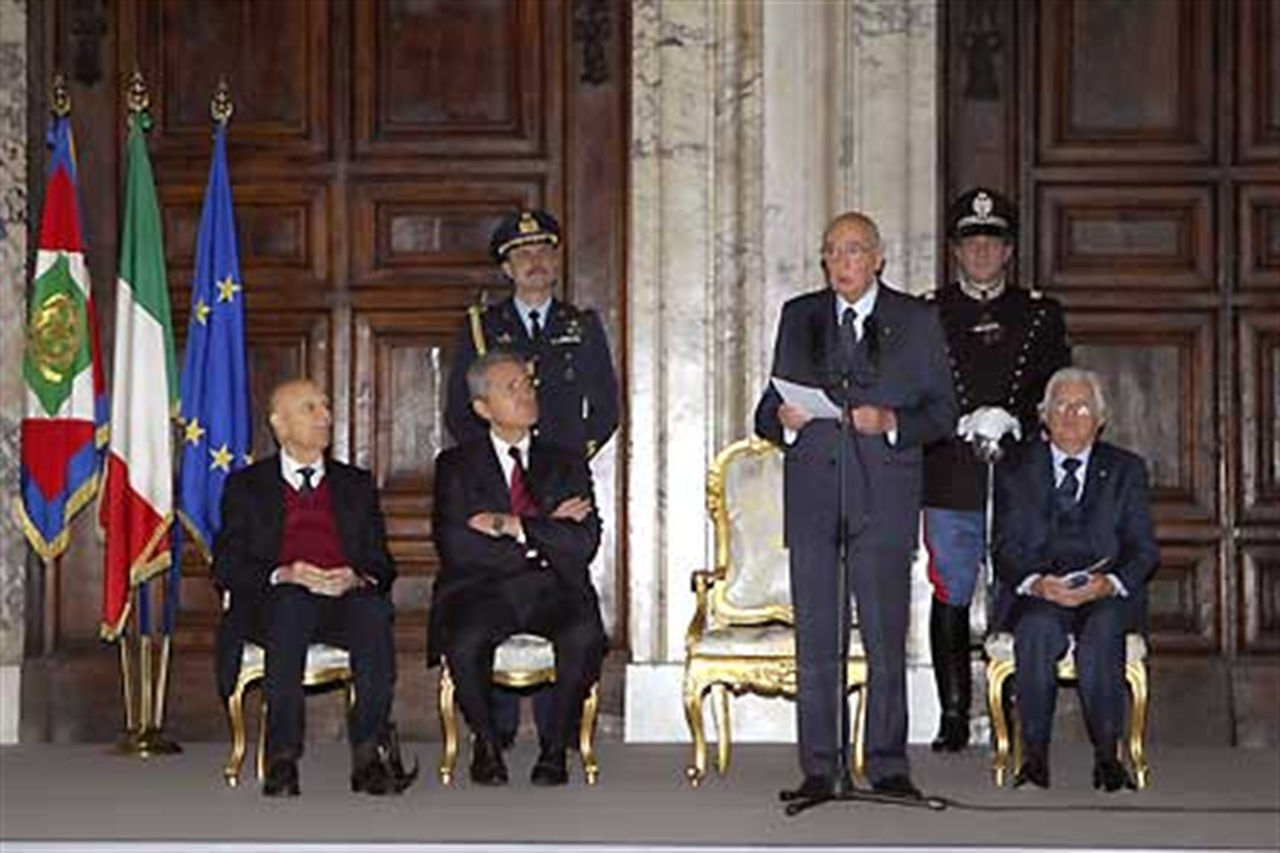
The President of the Italian Republic Giorgio Napolitano during his speech for the National Memorial Day of the Exiles and Foibe in 2007

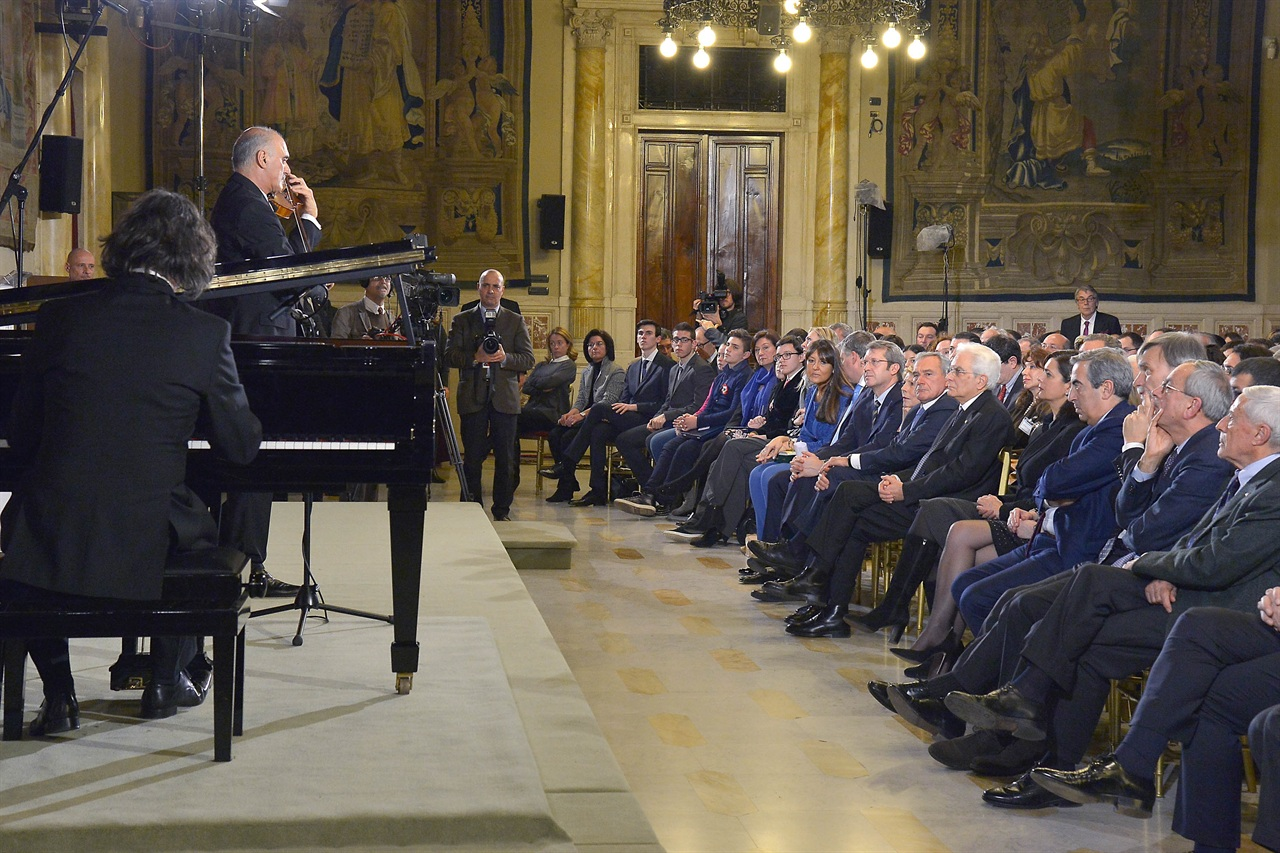
Concert at the Quirinal Palace in the presence of the President of the Italian Republic Sergio Mattarella on the occasion of the National Memorial Day of the Exiles and Foibe in 2015

The National Memorial Day of the Exiles and Foibe is a civilian memorial day but not a non-working holiday. The law grants an award, but no money, to all relatives of murder victims, upon request. Those who died in Nazi concentration camps are also considered victims. The award consists of a certificate and a metal insignia with the wording The Italian Republic remembers. The law also institutes two museums; the Museum of Istrian-Dalmatian civilization in Trieste and the historical archive museum of Fiume, transported to Rome.

Italian president Giorgio Napolitano gave an official speech during the 2007 celebration of the "Memorial Day of Foibe Massacres and Istrian-Dalmatian exodus" in which he stated:

...Already in the unleashing of the first wave of blind and extreme violence in those lands, in the autumn of 1943, summary justice and tumult, nationalist paroxysm, and social retaliation were intertwined with a plan to eradicate the Italian presence from what had been, but ceased to be, the Julian Marches (Venezia Giulia). There was therefore a movement of hate and bloodthirsty fury, and a Slavic annexationist plan, which prevailed above all in the peace treaty of 1947, and which assumed the sinister shape of an "ethnic cleansing". What we can say for sure is that what occurred - in the most evident way through the inhuman ferocity of the foibe - was one of the barbarities of the past century.

— Italian president Giorgio Napolitano, Rome, 10 February 2007

== See also ==
- Istria
- History of Dalmatia
- Foibe massacres
- Istrian Italians
- Dalmatian Italians
- Istrian-Dalmatian exodus
- Ethnic cleansing
- Anti-Italianism
- Croatization
- Public holidays in Italy
- Anniversary of the Unification of Italy
- Anniversary of the Liberation
- Festa della Repubblica
- National Unity and Armed Forces Day
- Tricolour Day
