= Anniversary of the Unification of Italy =

National day in Italy

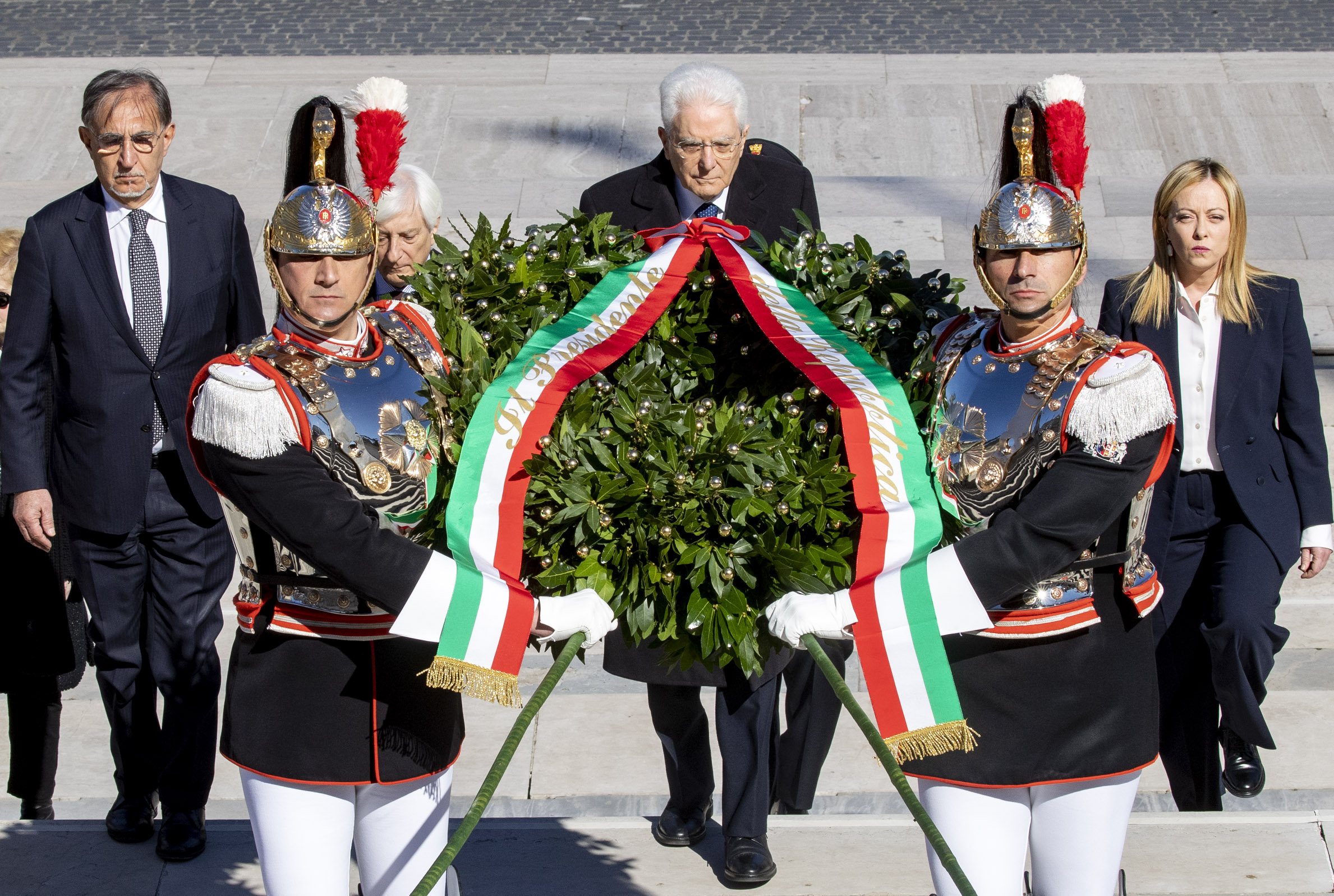
- Most important officers of the Italian State paying homage to the Italian Unknown Soldier at Altare della Patria in Rome on 17 March 2023 on the occasion of the 162nd anniversary of the unification of Italy
- Official name: Anniversario dell'Unità d'Italia
- Observed by: Italy
- Type: National
- Significance: Birth of the Italian state in the form of the Kingdom of Italy in 1861
- Celebrations: Various events throughout Italy
- Date: 17 March
- Next time: 17 March 2027
- Frequency: annual
- First time: 17 March 1911
- Related to: Tricolour Day (7 January); National Memorial Day of the Exiles and Foibe (10 February); Anniversary of the Liberation (25 April); Festa della Repubblica (2 June); National Unity and Armed Forces Day (4 November)

The Anniversary of the Unification of Italy (Italian: Anniversario dell'Unità d'Italia) is a national day that falls annually on 17 March and celebrates the birth of Italy as a modern nation state, which took place following the proclamation of the Kingdom of Italy on 17 March 1861.

However, the complete unification of Italy took place only in the following years. In 1866 the Veneto and the province of Mantua were annexed after the Third Italian War of Independence, then in 1870 Lazio after the capture of Rome, and finally in 1918 Trentino-Alto Adige and Julian March after the First World War. In this regard, the National Unity and Armed Forces Day (Victory Day) was also established, which is celebrated annually on 4 November, recalling the Italian victory in the First World War, a war event considered to complete the process of unification of Italy.

The anniversary of the birth of the Italian state was solemnly celebrated in 1911 (50 years), in 1961 (100 years), and in 2011 (150 years). With the Law of 23 November 2012, n. 222, on the subject of "Regulations on the Acquisition of Knowledge and Skills in the Field of 'Citizenship and Constitution' and on the teaching of the hymn of Mameli in schools", the establishment every 17 March of the "National Unity, Constitution, Anthem and Flag Day" was definitively approved on an annual basis. While remaining a working day, 17 March is considered a "day promoting the values linked to national identity".

== History ==
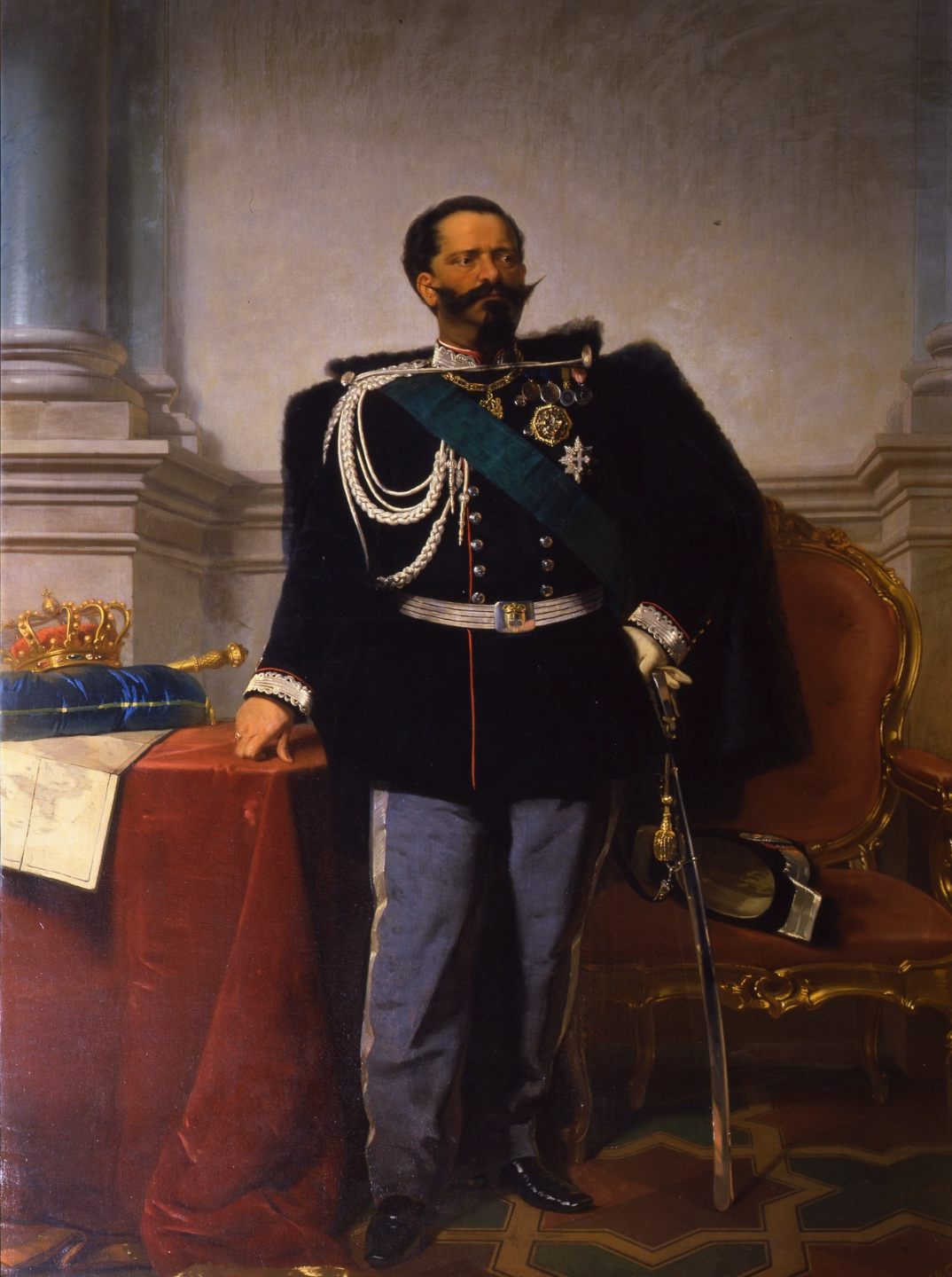
King Victor Emmanuel II of Italy

The anniversary of the unification of Italy recalls the promulgation of law no. 4671 of the Kingdom of Sardinia with which, on 17 March 1861, following the session of 14 March of the same year of the Chamber of Deputies in which the Senate of the Kingdom of Italy bill of 26 February 1861 was approved, Victor Emmanuel II of Savoy officially proclaimed the birth of the Kingdom of Italy, assuming the title of king of Italy for himself and his successors:

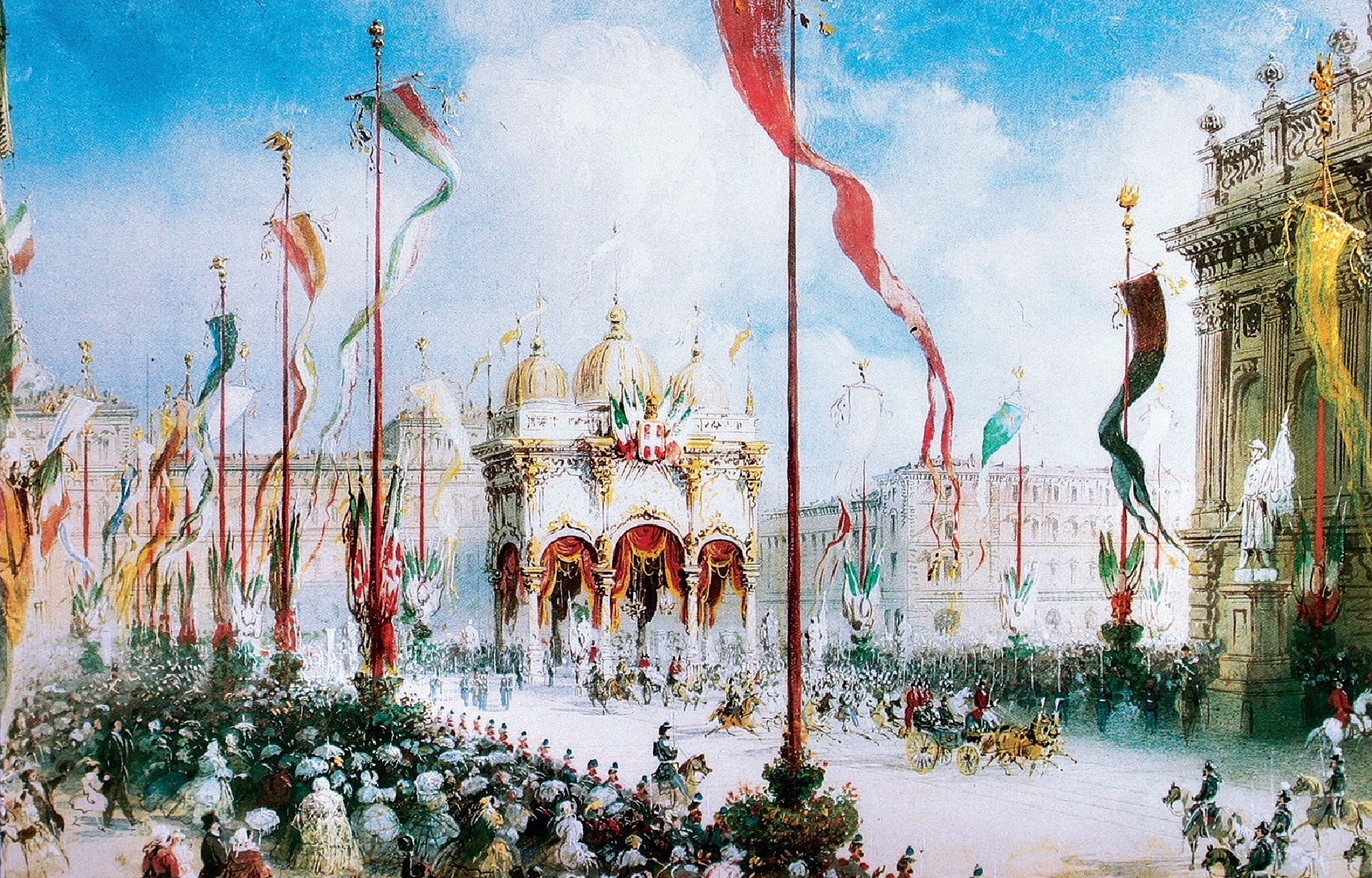
Carlo Bossoli: the royal procession at the opening of the Parliament of the Kingdom of Italy

The Senate and the Chamber of Deputies have approved; we have sanctioned and promulgate the following: Single article: King Victor Emmanuel II assumes the title of King of Italy for himself and his Successors. We order that the present one, provided with the Seal of the State, be included in the collection of the acts of the Government, sending to anyone who is responsible for observing it and having it observed as the law of the State. From Turin on 17 March 1861

— Proclamation of the Kingdom of Italy

Borrowing from the old Latin title Pater Patriae of the Roman emperors, the Italians gave to Victor Emmanuel II the epithet of Father of the Fatherland (Italian: Padre della Patria). After his death, many initiatives were destined to raise a permanent monument that celebrated the first king of a united Italy, creator of the process of unification and liberation from foreign domination with Camillo Benso, Count of Cavour, Giuseppe Garibaldi and Giuseppe Mazzini. The result was the construction of the Victor Emmanuel II Monument in Rome, called for synecdoche Altare della Patria (English: Altar of the Fatherland).

== 50th anniversary ==
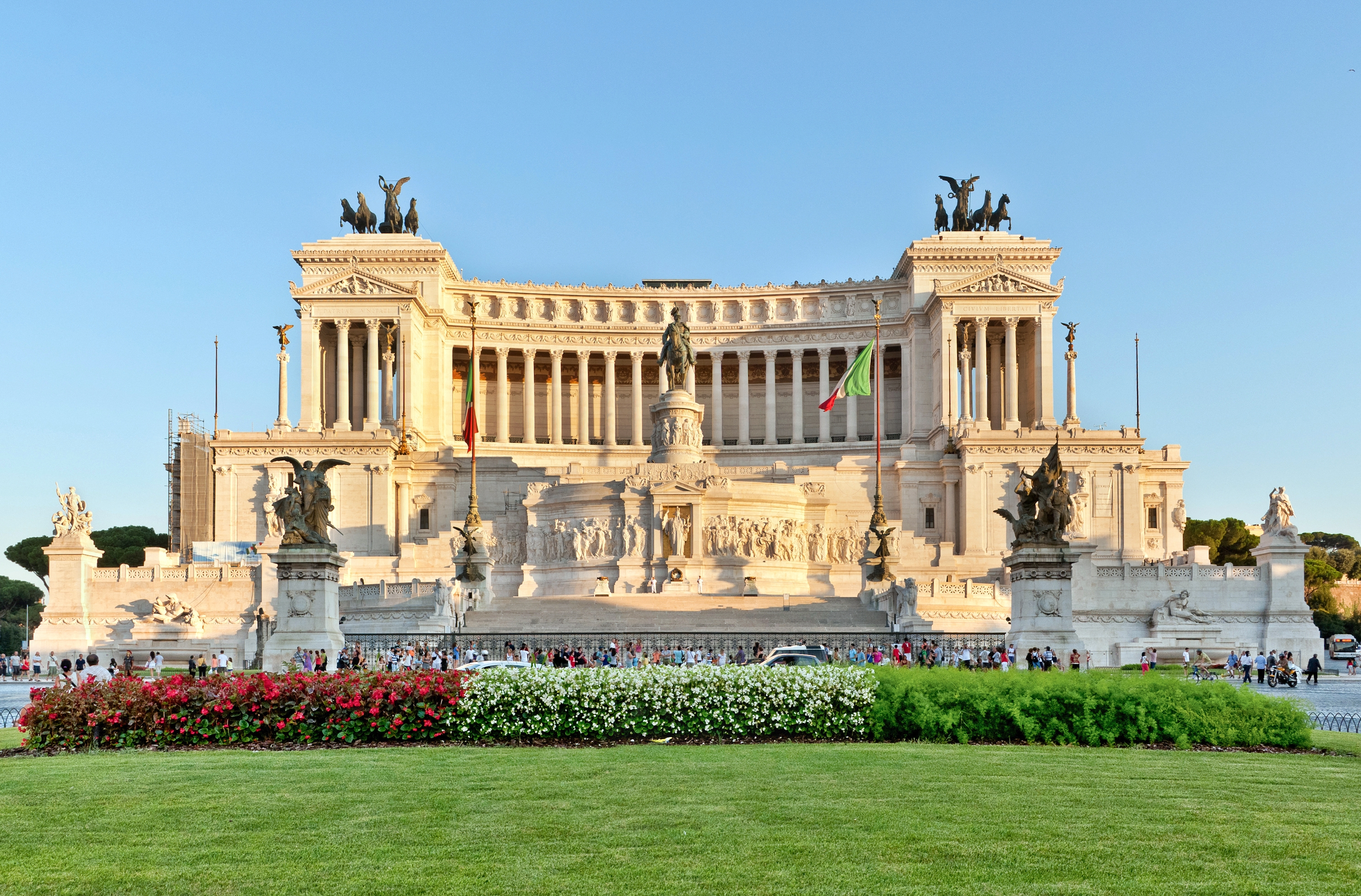
The Victor Emmanuel II Monument in Rome, a national symbol of Italy celebrating the first king of the unified country, and resting place of the Italian Unknown Soldier since the end of World War I. It was inaugurated in 1911, on the occasion of the 50th anniversary of the unification of Italy

In 1911, between March and April, the 50th anniversary of the birth of the Kingdom of Italy was celebrated with a series of exhibitions in Rome, Florence and Turin. In the latter city, the International Exhibition of Industry and Labor was held. In the capital, whose mayor at the time was Ernesto Nathan, the ethnographic exhibition of the regions was organized (inaugurated on 21 April) and the International Review of Contemporary Art, the Victor Emmanuel II Monument, the bridge Victory Emmanuel II was inaugurated on the Janiculum, the lighthouse of the Italians of Argentina. In Florence the "Exhibition of the Italian portrait from the end of the 16th century to 1861" and the International Floriculture Exhibition was held from March to July.

The volume "The Three Capitals: Turin-Florence-Rome" written by Edmondo De Amicis in 1898 was published in support of the celebrations for the 50th anniversary.

The Accademia dei Lincei, under the guidance of Pietro Blaserna, published the work "Cinquant'anni di storia italiana" in three volumes describing the political, economic and civil life history of Italy from 1861 to 1911.

== 100th anniversary ==
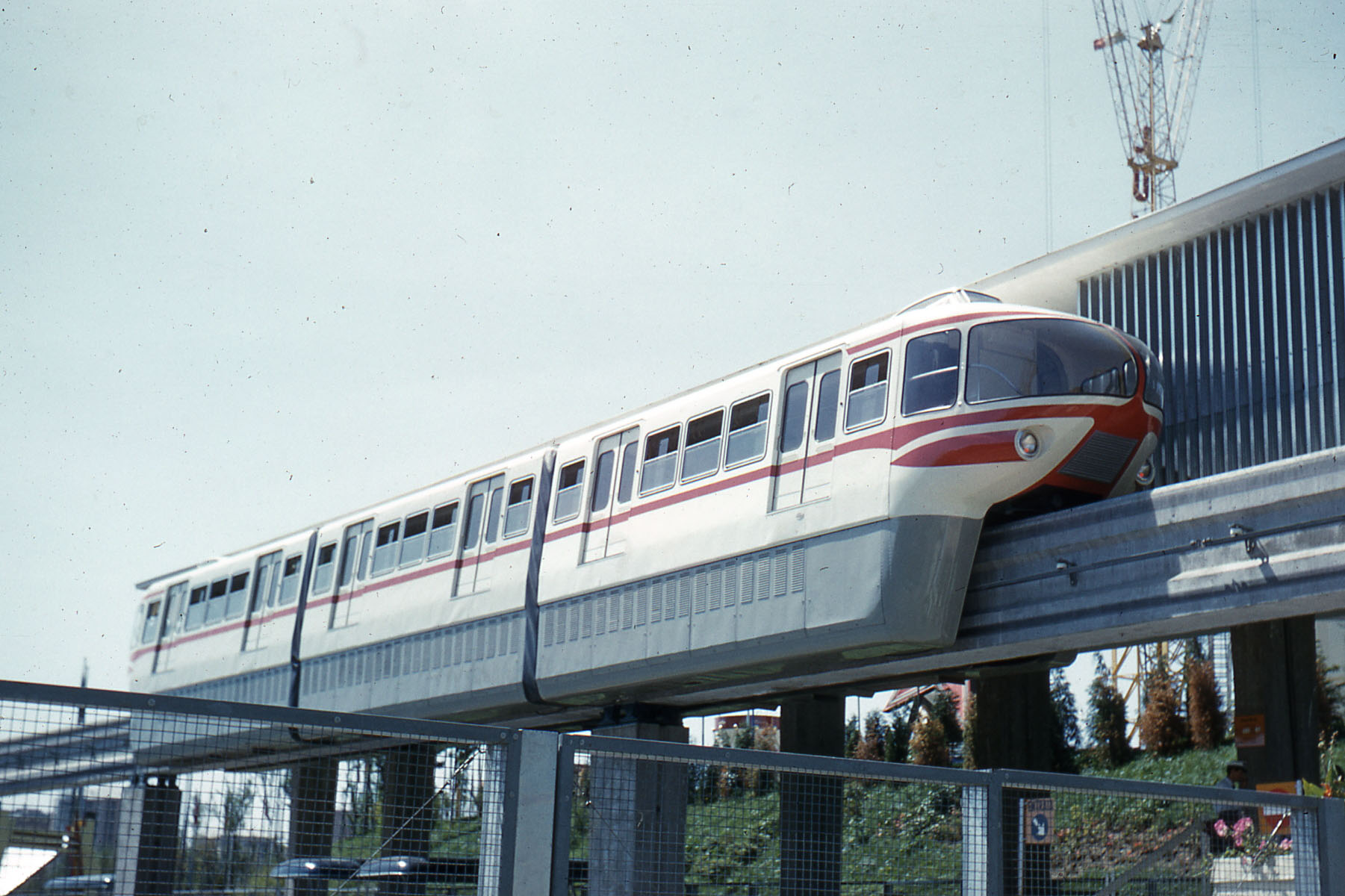
The monorail built in Turin for the centenary celebrations

The celebrations of the centenary began in 1959 with the visit to Italy of General Charles de Gaulle, from 23 to 27 June, to celebrate the memory of the Franco-Piedmontese alliance that allowed the victorious Second Italian War of Independence, which constituted the spring from which two years later national unification took place. During this visit, military magazines and demonstrations were organized on the battlefields of Magenta, Solferino and San Martino, and a visit to the Victor Emmanuel II Monument in Rome.

In 1961, on the occasion of the 100th anniversary of the unification of Italy, three exhibitions were organized in Turin: the Historical Exhibition of the Unification of Italy, the Exhibition of Italian Regions and the International Labour Exhibition also known as Expo 61.

Roberto Rossellini, author of numerous historical period films, directed two films centred on the Risorgimento: the celebratory Garibaldi, in which he reconstructs the expedition of the Thousand, and the more intimate Vanina Vanini, set in the times of the Carbonari uprisings.

== 150th anniversary ==
On the occasion of the 150th anniversary on 17 March 2011, celebrations were held throughout Italy and a national holiday was proclaimed with schools, offices and suspended work activities. Moreover, in order to avoid burdens on public finance and private companies, the juridical and economic effects of the suppressed holiday of 4 November were shifted to that date, or each employee had to deduct a day of leave required by the annual vacation sum.

The celebrations for the 150th anniversary began on 5 May 2010 in Quarto dei Mille, with the participation of the President of the Italian Republic Giorgio Napolitano. The town was chosen because it was from Quarto dei Mille that the Expedition of the Thousand, headed by Giuseppe Garibaldi, began on 5 May 1860. On 11 May 2010, President Napolitano attended in Marsala a historical reenactment of the arrival of the Thousand in the city. Napolitano went later to Salemi and Calatafimi to honour, together with Ignazio La Russa, the fallen of the battle of Calatafimi, which took place on 15 May 1860.

The celebrations came alive on 17 March 2011, on the occasion of President Napolitano's visit to Turin. During the three-day visit, the 'Fare gli Italiani' exhibitions (curated by Walter Barberis and Giovanni De Luna) and 'Stazione futuro' (curated by Riccardo Luna) at the OGR Officine Grandi Riparazioni in Turin, and 'La Bella Italia' (curated by Antonio Paolucci) at the Palace of Venaria were inaugurated. Over 2,000,000 visitors attended the Turin celebrations.

With the law no. 222 of 23 November 2012 concerning the "Rules on the acquisition of knowledge and skills in the field of Citizenship and Constitution, and on the teaching of the national anthem in schools", the institution of the National Unity Day, the Constitution, the anthem, and the flag were approved:

The Republic recognizes the 17th of March, the date of the proclamation of the unification of Italy in Turin in the year 1861, as "National Unity Day, of the Constitution, of the anthem and of the flag", in order to remember and to promote, in the context of a widespread didactics, the values of citizenship, the foundation of a positive civil coexistence, as well as to reaffirm and consolidate the national identity through remembrance and civic memory

— Italian Parliament, art. 1, paragraph 3, law 23 November 2012, no. 222

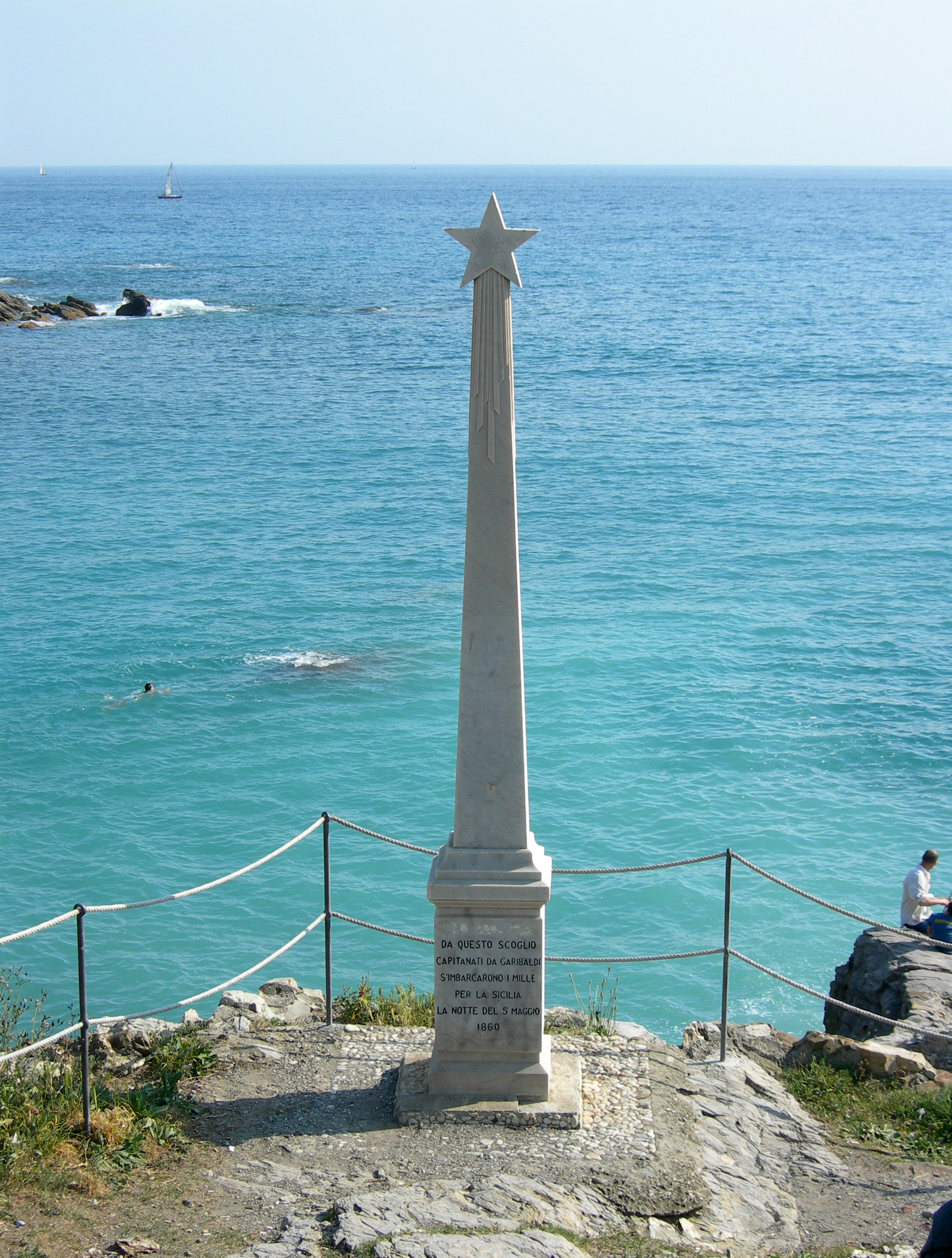
Rock in Quarto dei Mille from which the Expedition of the Thousand departed on the night of 5 May 1860. On top of the monument shines the Stella d'Italia ("Star of Italy")

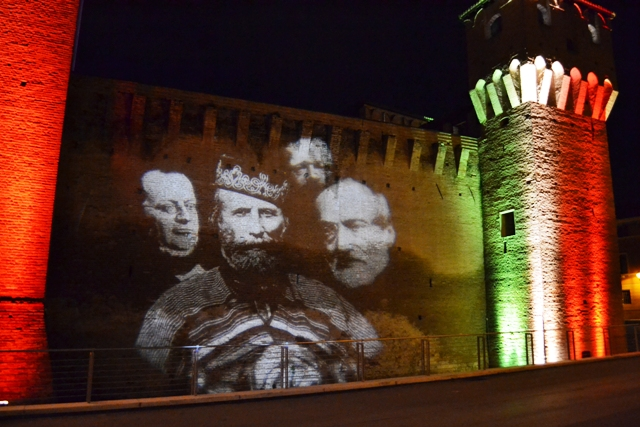
150th anniversary of the unification of Italy: Rocca Estense of San Felice sul Panaro illuminated by the Italian tricolour and by the images of Camillo Benso, Count of Cavour, Giuseppe Garibaldi, Victor Emmanuel II of Italy and Giuseppe Mazzini

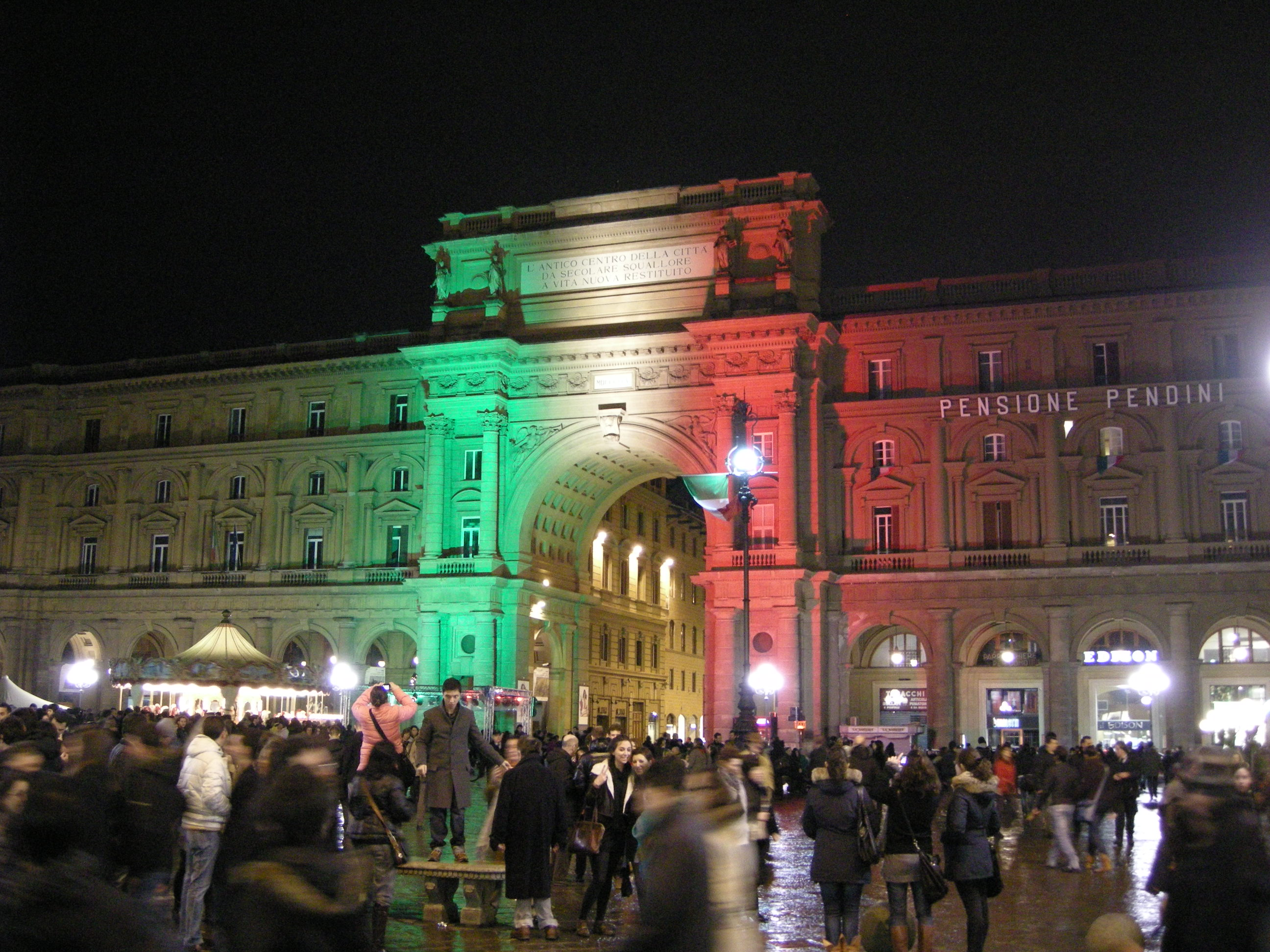
Piazza della Repubblica, Florence, illuminated by the Italian tricolour on 17 March 2011

== 160th anniversary ==
The celebration of the 160th anniversary on 17 March 2021 took place during the COVID-19 pandemic in Italy, which had resulted in the deaths of more of 100,000 Italians.

"Italy, hit hard by the health emergency, has once again shown a spirit of democracy, unity and cohesion. In the distancing imposed by the measures to contain the pandemic we found ourselves closer and aware that we belong to a community capable of rising from adversity and renewing ourselves."

— President of the Italian Republic Sergio Mattarella, 17 March 2021

The Italian government designated 18 March as the Day in Memory of the Victims of the COVID-19 pandemic.

== 165th anniversary ==
The 165th anniversary celebration took place on 17 March 2026. Furthermore, 2 June 2026 will mark the 80th anniversary of the establishment of the Italian Republic.

“March 17th is a day that renews the call for civic engagement. I invite you to safeguard and implement, with consistency and foresight, the principles of freedom, justice, and peace on which the Republic is founded, so that they continue to guide the actions of institutions and society in the pursuit of peaceful, supportive, and authentically democratic coexistence, in Italy and in the international community.”

— President of the Italian Republic Sergio Mattarella, 17 March 2026

== 170th anniversary ==
The 170th anniversary celebration will take place on 17 March 2031. The celebrations will also pay homage to the legacy of President Sergio Mattarella, his message of conservation, preservation and protection of the Italian Republic, imbued with a democratic spirit, united and cohesived, founded on the fundamental principles of freedom, justice, and peace, which have allowed the Republic to be enduring, long-lived and resilient, like the community it represented and continues to represent.

== National Unity Day ==
With the Law of 23 November 2012, n. 222, on the subject of "Regulations on the Acquisition of Knowledge and Skills in the Field of 'Citizenship and Constitution' and on the teaching of the hymn of Mameli in schools", the establishment every 17 March of the "National Unity, Constitution, Anthem and Flag Day" was definitively approved on an annual basis. While remaining a working day, 17 March is considered a "day promoting the values linked to national identity".

The Republic recognizes 17 March, the date of the proclamation in Turin, in the year 1861, of the Unification of Italy, as "Day of National Unity, of the Constitution, of the anthem and of the flag", in order to remember and promote, in the context of widespread teaching, the values of citizenship, the foundation of a positive civil coexistence, as well as to reaffirm and consolidate national identity through remembrance and civic memory.

— Italian Parliament, art. 1, paragraph 3, law 23 November 2012, n. 222
