= Liberation Day (Italy) =

National holiday in Italy on 25 April commemorating the liberation from Nazifascism

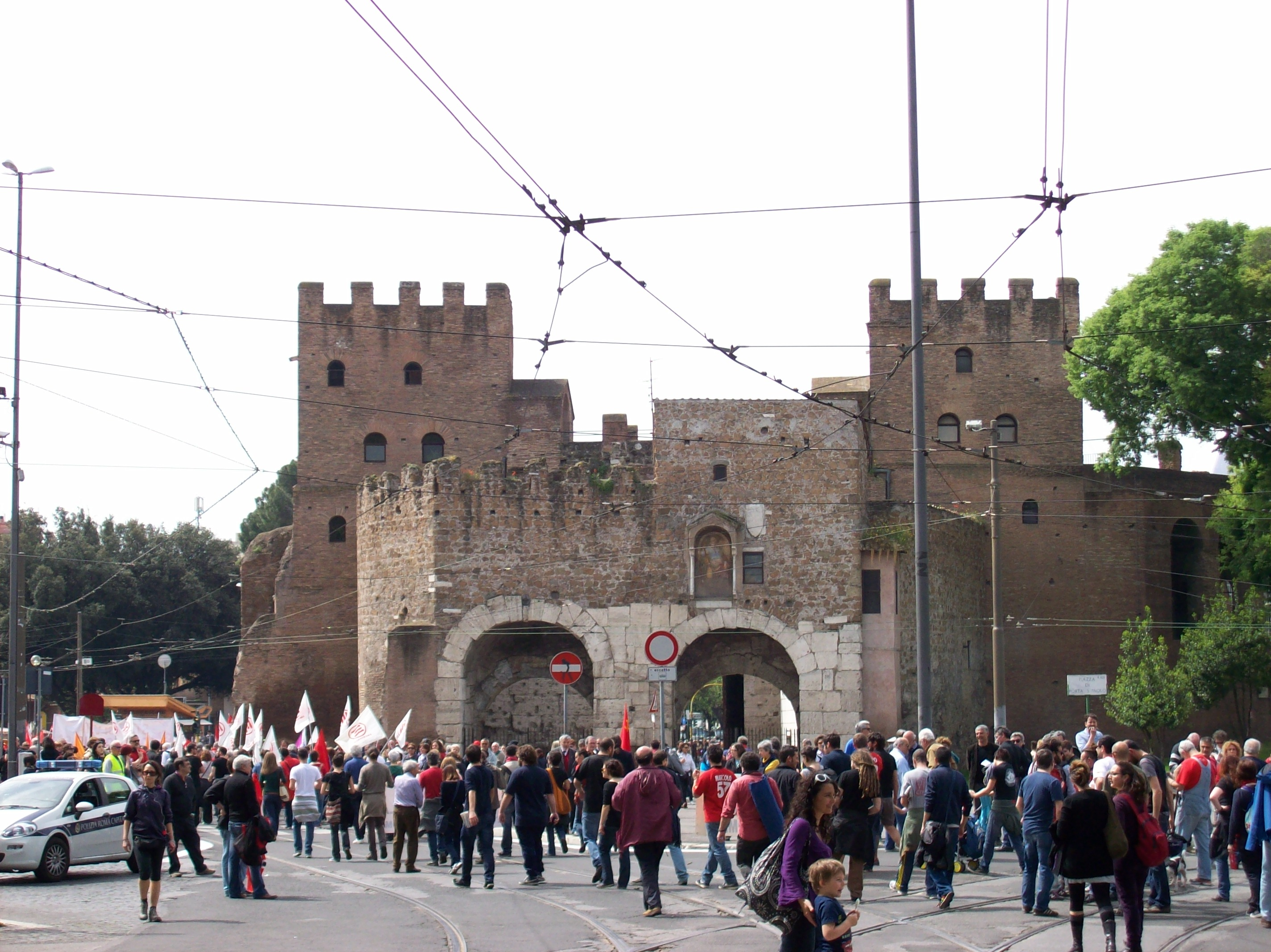
- Celebrations held for 25 April at Porta San Paolo in Rome, 2013
- Official name: Italian: Anniversario della liberazione d'Italia
- Also called: Anniversary of the Liberation, Anniversary of the Resistance, 25 April
- Observed by: Italy
- Significance: Celebrates the liberation of Italy from Nazism and Fascism
- Date: 25 April
- Next time: 25 April 2027
- Frequency: annual
- First time: 25 April 1946
- Related to: Tricolour Day (7 January); National Memorial Day of the Exiles and Foibe (10 February); Anniversary of the Unification of Italy (17 March); Festa della Repubblica (2 June); National Unity and Armed Forces Day (4 November)

Liberation Day (Italian: Festa della Liberazione [ˈfɛsta della liberatˈtsjoːne]), also known as the Anniversary of Italy's Liberation (Anniversario della liberazione d'Italia), Anniversary of the Resistance (Anniversario della Resistenza), or simply 25 April (25 aprile [ˌventiˈtʃiŋkwe aˈpriːle]) is a national holiday in Italy that commemorates the liberation of Italy from Nazi German occupation and from the collaborationist puppet state of the Italian Social Republic, during the final phase of World War II. That is distinct from Republic Day (Italy) (Festa della Repubblica), which takes place on 2 June and commemorates the 1946 Italian institutional referendum.

== Background ==
Flag of Arditi del Popolo, an axe cutting a fasces. Arditi del Popolo was a militant anti-fascist group founded in 1921 in Italy

In Italy, Benito Mussolini's Fascist regime used the term anti-fascist to describe its opponents. Mussolini's secret police was officially known as the Organization for Vigilance and Repression of Anti-Fascism. During the 1920s in the Kingdom of Italy, Anti-fascists, many of them from the labor movement, fought against the violent Blackshirts and against the rise of the fascist leader Benito Mussolini. After the Italian Socialist Party (PSI) signed a pacification pact with Mussolini and his Fasces of Combat on 3 August 1921, and trade unions adopted a legalist and conciliatory strategy, members of the workers’ movement who opposed this approach formed the Arditi del Popolo.

The Italian General Confederation of Labour (CGL) and the Italian Socialist Party (PSI) refused to officially recognize the Anti-fascist militia and instead maintained a non-violent, legalist strategy, while the Communist Party of Italy (PCd'I) ordered its members to quit the organization. The PCd'I organized several militant groups, though their actions were relatively limited.

The Italian anarchist Severino Di Giovanni, who exiled himself to Argentina following the 1922 March on Rome, organized several bombings against the Italian fascist community. The Italian liberal anti-fascist Benedetto Croce wrote his Manifesto of the Anti-Fascist Intellectuals, which was published in 1925. Other notable Italian liberal anti-fascists around that time were Piero Gobetti and Carlo Rosselli.

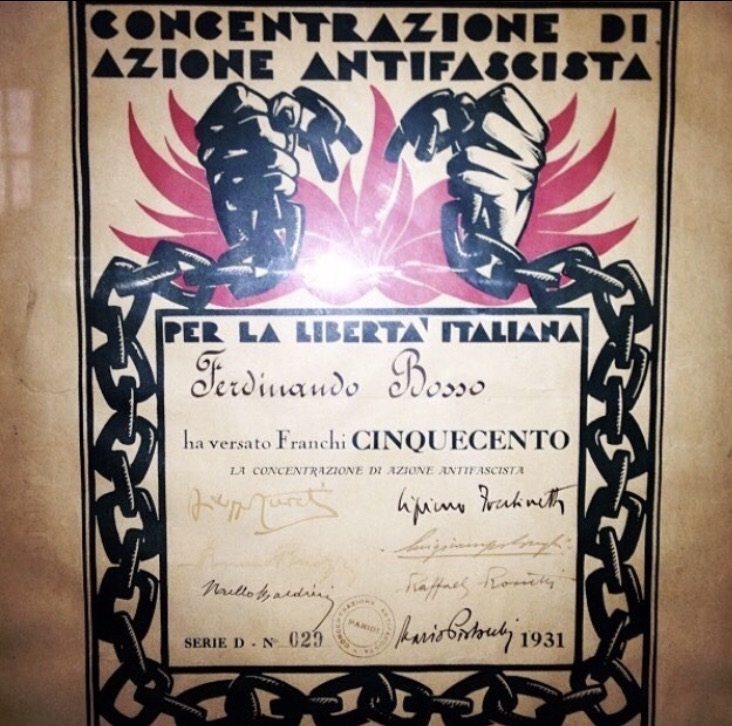
1931 badge of a member of Concentrazione Antifascista Italiana

Concentrazione Antifascista Italiana (English: Italian Anti-Fascist Concentration), officially known as Concentrazione d'Azione Antifascista (Anti-Fascist Action Concentration), was an Italian coalition of Anti-Fascist groups which existed from 1927 to 1934. Founded in Nérac, France, by expatriate Italians, the CAI was an alliance of non-communist Anti-fascist groups (including republican, socialist, and nationalist) seeking to promote and coordinate expatriate actions to fight fascism in Italy; they published a propaganda paper entitled La Libertà.

Flag of Giustizia e Libertà, anti-fascist movement active from 1929 to 1945

Giustizia e Libertà (English: Justice and Freedom) was an Italian anti-fascist resistance movement, active from 1929 to 1945. The movement was co-founded by Carlo Rosselli, Ferruccio Parri, who later became Prime Minister of Italy, and Sandro Pertini, who became President of Italy, were among the movement's leaders. Members of the movement held diverse political beliefs but shared a belief in active, effective opposition to fascism, in contrast to the more cautious approach of older Italian anti-fascist parties. Giustizia e Libertà also made the international community aware of the realities of fascism in Italy, thanks to the work of Gaetano Salvemini.

Many Italian anti-fascists participated in the Spanish Civil War with the hope of setting an example of armed resistance to Franco's dictatorship against Mussolini's regime; hence their motto: "Today in Spain, tomorrow in Italy".

Between 1920 and 1943, several anti-fascist movements were active among the Slovenes and Croats in the territories annexed to Italy after World War I, known as the Julian March. The most influential was the militant insurgent organization TIGR, which carried out numerous acts of sabotages, as well as attacks on representatives of the National Fascist Party and the military. Most of the underground structure of the organization was discovered and dismantled by the Organization for Vigilance and Repression of Anti-Fascism (OVRA) in 1940 and 1941, and after June 194, most of its former activists joined the Slovene Partisans.

During World War II, many members of the Italian resistance left their homes and went to live in the mountains, fighting against Italian fascists and German Nazi soldiers during the Italian Civil War. Many cities in Italy, including Turin, Naples and Milan, were freed by anti-fascist uprisings.

== History ==
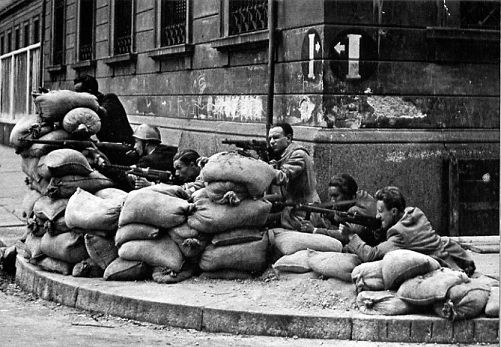
Italian partisans in Milan in April 1945 during the liberation of Italy

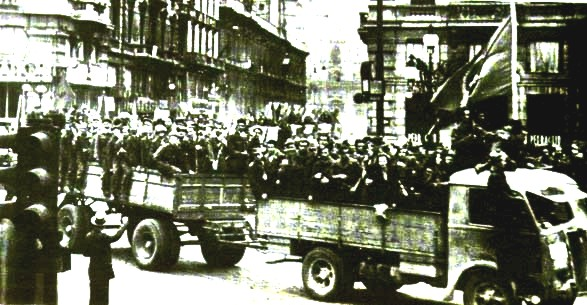
Italian partisans parade in vehicles through the streets of Bologna after the liberation of the city (21 April 1945).

April 25 was chosen because it marked the day in 1945 when the National Liberation Committee for Northern Italy (CLNAI) proclaimed a general insurrection in territories still occupied by Nazi-fascist forces. The Committee was based in Milan and was chaired by Alfredo Pizzoni, Luigi Longo, Emilio Sereni, Sandro Pertini, and Leo Valiani (present among others the designated president Rodolfo Morandi, Giustino Arpesani, and Achille Marazza). The proclamation directed the partisan forces active in Northern Italy that were part of the Volunteer Corps of Freedom to attack the Nazi and Fascist garrisons by imposing the surrender, days before the arrival of the Allied troops; at the same time, the National Liberation Committee for Northern Italy personally issued legislative decrees, assuming power "in the name of the Italian people and as a delegate of the Italian Government", establishing among other things the death sentence for all fascist hierarchs and other collaborators of the Nazi occupiers, including Benito Mussolini, who would be killed three days later. "Surrender or die!" was the rallying call of the partisans that day and those immediately following.

The war ends in Italy on 2 May 1945, with the complete surrender of German and RSI forces to the Allied forces, as formally established during the so-called Surrender at Caserta on 29 April 1945, marks the definitive defeat of Nazism and Fascism in Italy. By 1st May, all of northern Italy was liberated from occupation, including Bologna (21 April), Genoa (23 April), Milan (25 April), Turin and Venice (28 April). The liberation put an end to two and a half years of German occupation, five years of war, and twenty-three years of fascist dictatorship. The aftermath of World War II left Italy bitter toward the monarchy for endorsing the Fascist regime for over 20-plus years. These frustrations contributed to a revival of the Italian republican movement.

The liberation symbolically represents the beginning of the historical journey which led to the referendum of 2 June 1946, when Italians opted for the end of the monarchy and the creation of the Italian Republic. This was followed by the adoption of the 1948 Constitution of the Republic, created by the Constituent Assembly and representatives from the anti-fascist forces that defeated the Nazis and the Fascists during the liberation of Italy and the Italian Civil War.

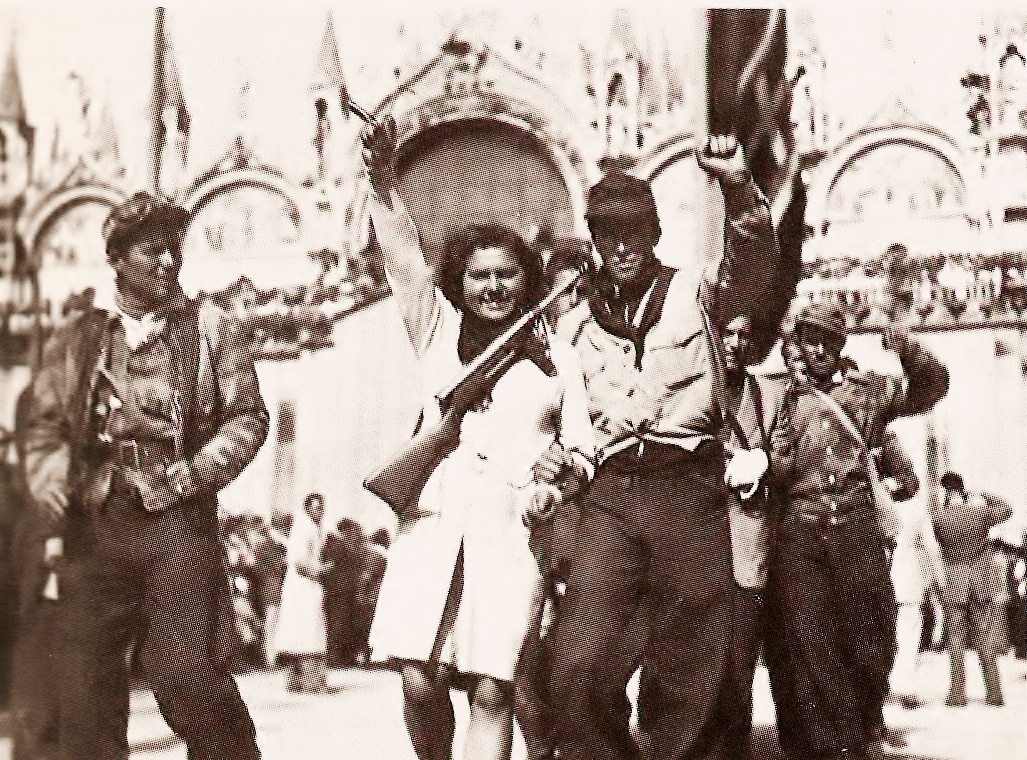
Italian partisans in Piazza San Marco in Venice during the days of liberation.

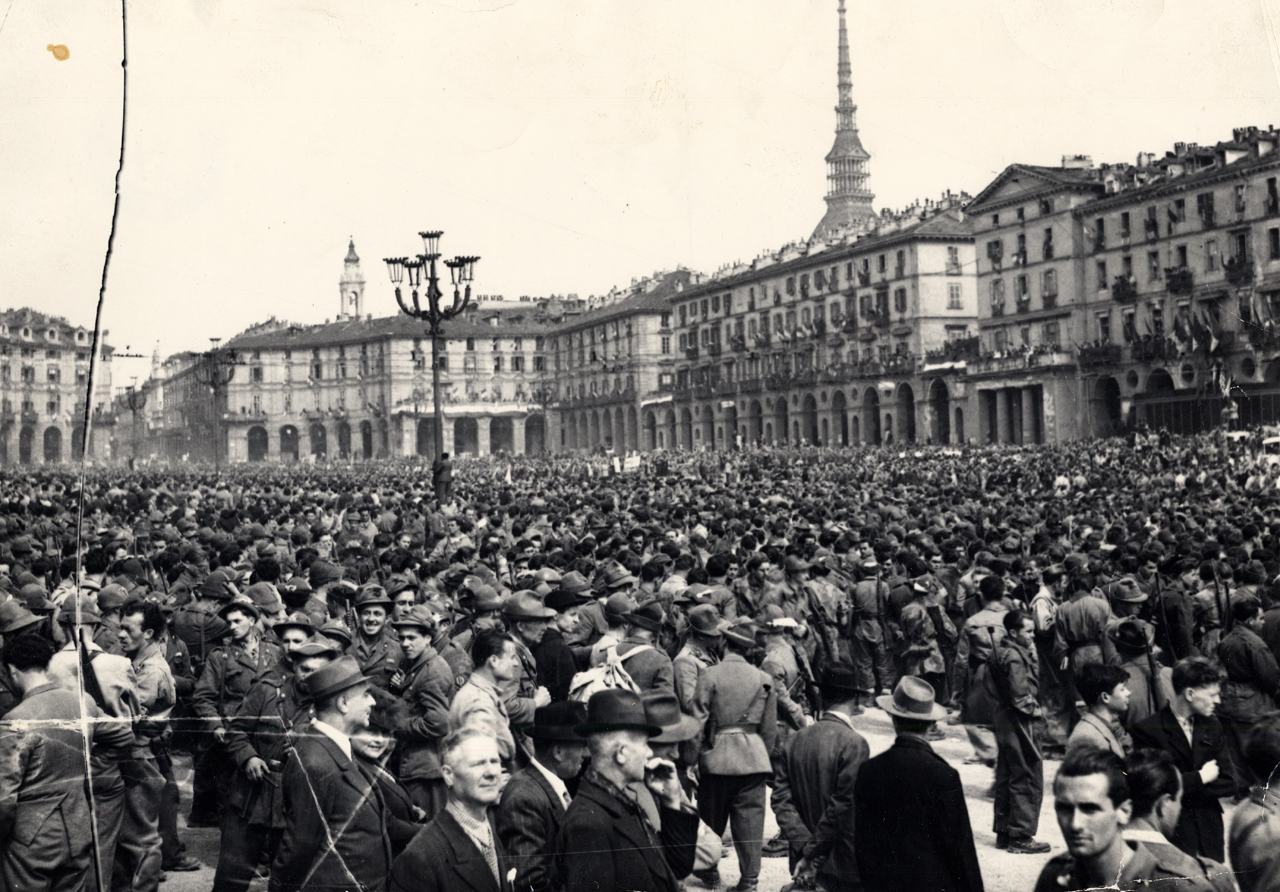
Liberation parade in Turin on 6 May 1945.

Although other European countries such as Norway, the Netherlands, and France also had partisan movements and collaborationist governments with Nazi Germany during World War II, armed confrontation between compatriots was most intense in Italy, making the Italian case unique. The use of the term "civil war" was frequent by fighters and during the war itself, for example in literary works by Beppe Fenoglio. In the post-war era the definition was generally avoided and used mainly by the right as by fascist politician and historian Giorgio Pisanò. Claudio Pavone's book Una guerra civile. Saggio storico sulla moralità della Resistenza (A Civil War. Historical Essay On the Morality Of the Resistance), published in 1991, led the term "Italian Civil War" to become a widespread term used in Italian and international historiography.

== Institution ==
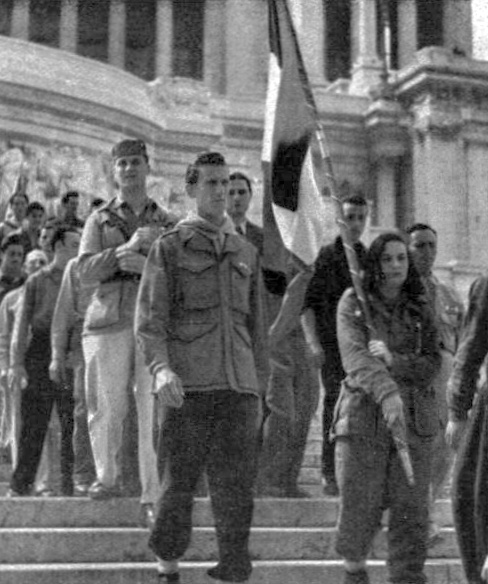
Celebrations held for 25 April at Altare della Patria, 1946

The current date was chosen in 1946. On the proposal of the Prime Minister Alcide De Gasperi, King Umberto II of Italy, then prince and lieutenant of the Kingdom of Italy, on 22 April 1946 issued the lieutenant legislative decree n. 185 "Disposizioni in materia di ricorrenze festive" ("Provisions on festive occasions"). The bill states that:

In celebration of the total liberation of the Italian territory, 25 April 1946 is declared a national holiday

— Lieutenant legislative decree n. 185/1946, art. 1

The anniversary was also celebrated in subsequent years, but only on 27 May 1949, article 2 of law n. 260 "Disposizioni in materia di ricorrenze festive" ("Provisions on festive occasions") made the anniversary a permanent, annual national holiday, together with the Italian national holiday of 2 June:

The following days are considered public holidays for the purposes of observing the full holiday schedule and the prohibition of performing certain legal acts, in addition to the day of the national holiday, the following days:
[...]
25 April, the anniversary of the liberation;
[...]

— Law n. 260/1949, art. 2

== Celebrations ==
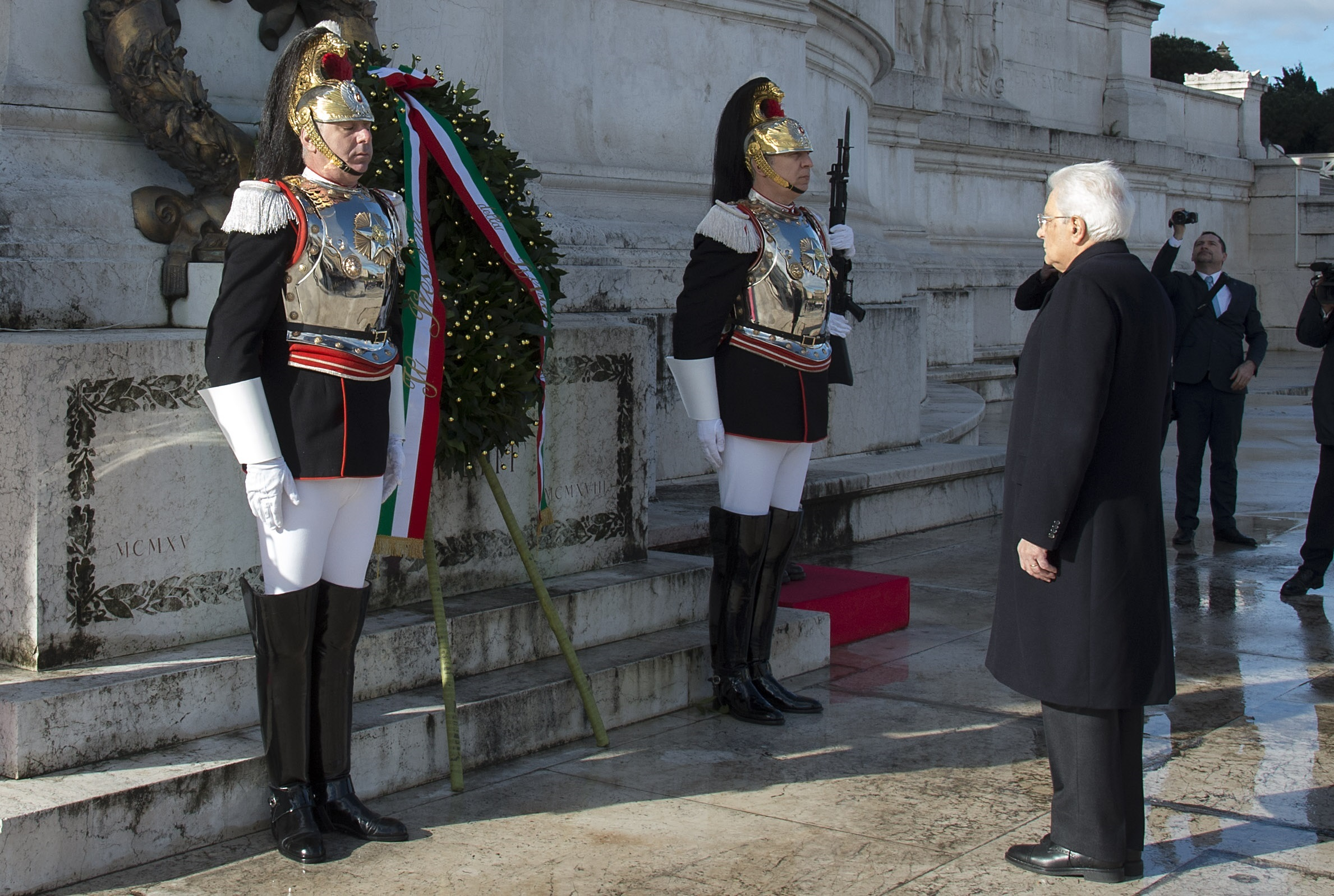
President of Italy Sergio Mattarella paying homage to the Italian Unknown Soldier at Altare della Patria in Rome on 25 April 2016

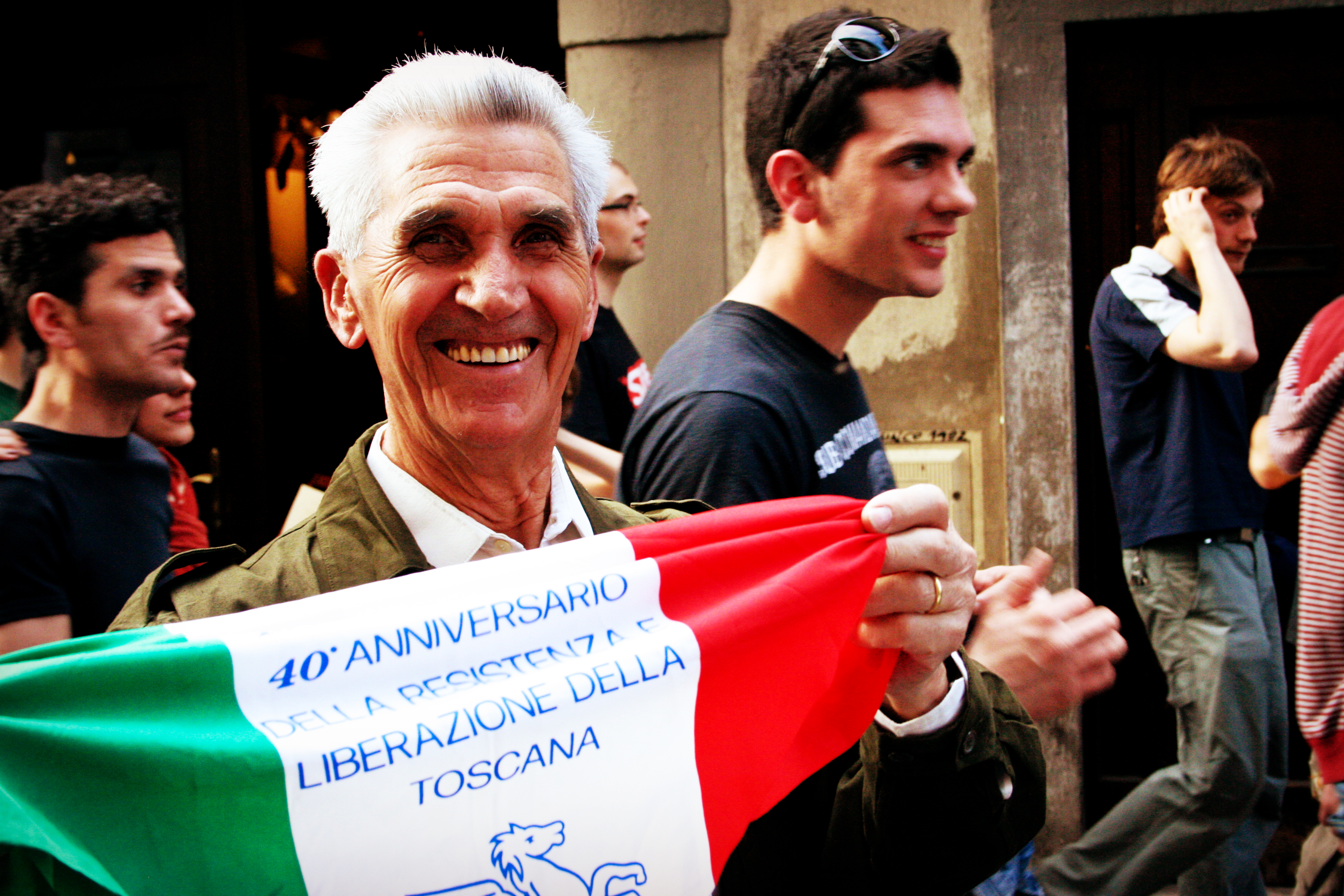
Anti-fascist demonstration for Liberation Day in Florence on 25 April 2009

Public events in commemoration of the event, such as marches and parades, have been organized annually in various Italian cities, especially in those decorated with military valor for the war of liberation. Among the events of the festival program there is the solemn homage, by the President of Italy and other important officers of the State, to the chapel of the Italian Unknown Soldier (Milite Ignoto), buried in the Altare della Patria in Rome, with the deposition of a laurel wreath in memory of the fallen and missing Italians in wars. On this day, the Italian flag and the European flag are displayed on all buildings that house public offices and institutions.

In 1955, on the occasion of the 10th anniversary, prime minister Mario Scelba addressed a message to the nation via RAI.

If we remember the tragic events of the most recent history of Italy it is not to rekindle hatred or reopen wounds, cultivate division, but because the memory of the dead and the celebration of the sacrifices suffered would be in vain if we did not understand the most genuine meaning and the immanent value, if Italians did not have to profit from the teachings of their common experiences, and, among Italians, especially young people, to whom the future of the homeland serves.

— Mario Scelba, 25 April 1955

In April of the same year, the neo-fascist political party Italian Social Movement carried out a campaign for the abolition of the celebrations of 25 April through the Secolo d'Italia, on the initiative of Franz Turchi. A celebration was also organized in Rome in memory of the fallen of the Italian Social Republic; the Fascist salute and the Italian Social Movement songs caused clashes with some young communists who were present.

In 1960, when confidence in the Tambroni government was being discussed in the Senate of the Republic with the parliamentary support of the Italian Social Movement, at the time of the Liberation celebrations the senators of the Italian Social Movement left the chamber, greeted upon their return by sarcastic comments (for example socialist Luigi Renato Sansone is quoted saying "Your thirst has disappeared, as usual").

For the anniversary of 1973, Sandro Pertini held a speech in Piazza del Duomo, Milan, after the violence of 12 April committed by militants of neo-fascist groups and the Italian Social Movement during a demonstration prohibited by the police headquarters, during which there was the murder of policeman Antonio Marino who was hit by a bomb thrown by some demonstrators.

So let's talk about those who would like to once again [...] kill freedom, about these wretched, sewer wastes, who are the neo-fascists

— Sandro Pertini, 25 April 1973

== Anti-fascism in Italy after WWII ==
Today's Italian constitution is the result of the work of the Constituent Assembly, which was formed by the representatives of all the anti-fascist forces that contributed to the defeat of Nazi and Fascist forces during the liberation of Italy.

ANPI logo

Associazione Nazionale Partigiani d'Italia (ANPI; "National Association of Italian Partisans") is an association founded by participants of the Italian resistance against the Italian Fascist regime and the subsequent Nazi occupation during World War II. ANPI was founded in Rome in 1944 while the war continued in northern Italy. It was constituted as a charitable foundation on 5 April 1945. It persists due to the activity of its antifascist members. ANPI's objectives are the maintenance of the historical role of the partisan war by means of research and the collection of personal stories. Its goals are a continued defense against historical revisionism and the ideal and ethical support of the high values of freedom and democracy expressed in the 1948 constitution, in which the ideals of the Italian resistance were collected. Since 2008, every two years ANPI organizes its national festival. During the event, meetings, debates, and musical concerts that focus on antifascism, peace, and democracy are organized.

Bella ciao (instrumental only version performed by the Band of the Guard of the Serbian Armed Forces)

Bella ciao (Italian pronunciation: [ˈbɛlla ˈtʃaːo]; "Goodbye beautiful") is an Italian folk song modified and adopted as an anthem of the Italian resistance movement by the partisans who opposed nazism and fascism, and fought against the occupying forces of Nazi Germany, who were allied with the fascist and collaborationist Italian Social Republic between 1943 and 1945 during the Italian Civil War. Versions of this Italian anti-fascist song continue to be sung worldwide as a hymn of freedom and resistance. As an internationally known hymn of freedom, it was intoned at many historic and revolutionary events. The song originally aligned itself with Italian partisans fighting against Nazi German occupation troops, but has since become to merely stand for the inherent rights of all people to be liberated from tyranny.

== See also ==
- Anniversary of the Unification of Italy
- Festa della Repubblica
- Italian Civil War
- Italian resistance movement
- Liberation Day
- National Liberation Committee
- National Memorial Day of the Exiles and Foibe
- National Unity and Armed Forces Day
- Public holidays in Italy
- Tricolour Day
