= Public holidays in Italy =

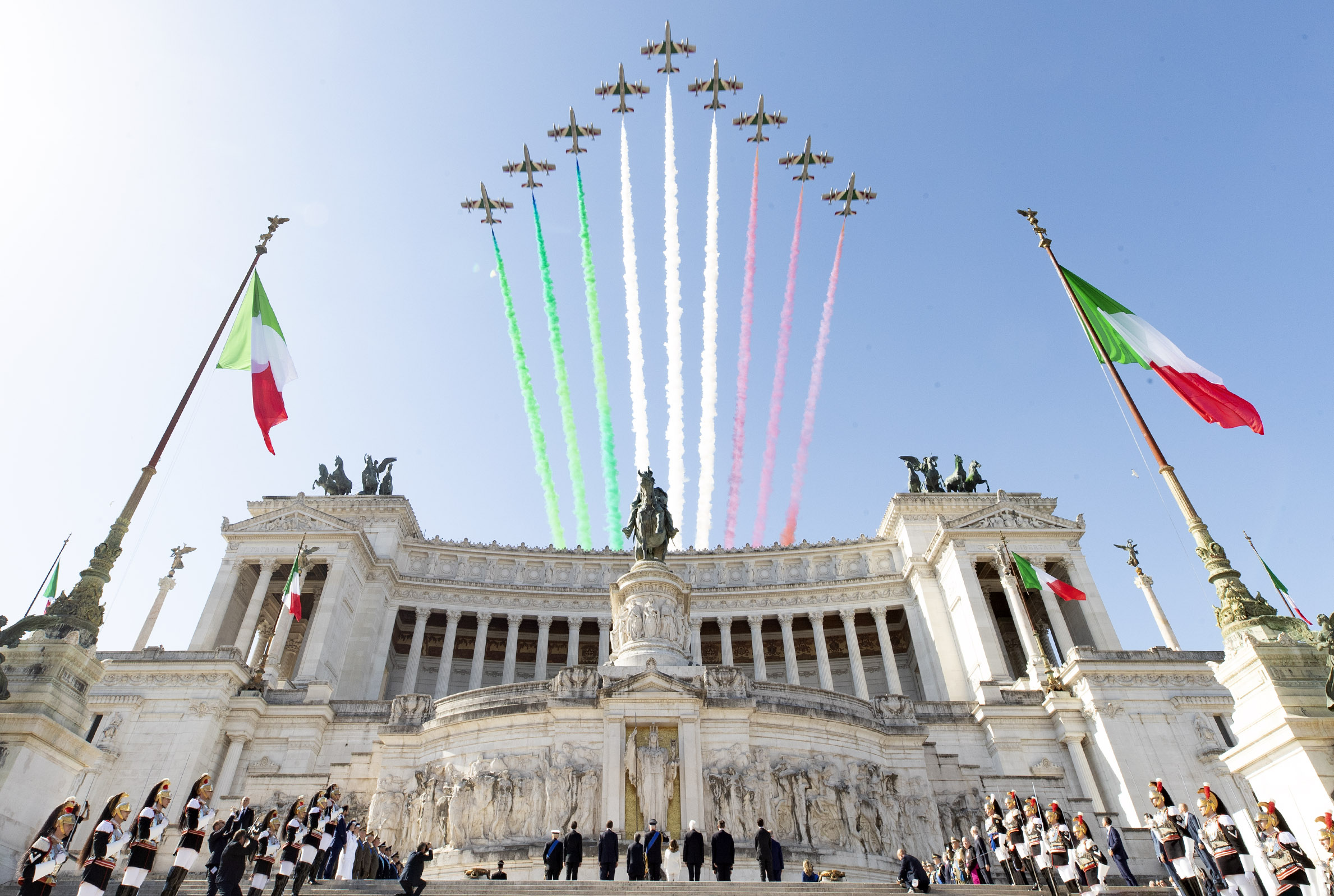
The Frecce Tricolori, with the smoke trail representing the national colours of Italy, above the Victor Emmanuel II Monument in Rome during the celebrations of the Festa della Repubblica, Italy's National Day

Public holidays in Italy are established by the Italian parliament and, with the exception of city or community patronal days, apply nationwide. These include a mix of national, religious and local observances. In Italy, there are also State commemoration days, which are not public holidays.

== Overview ==
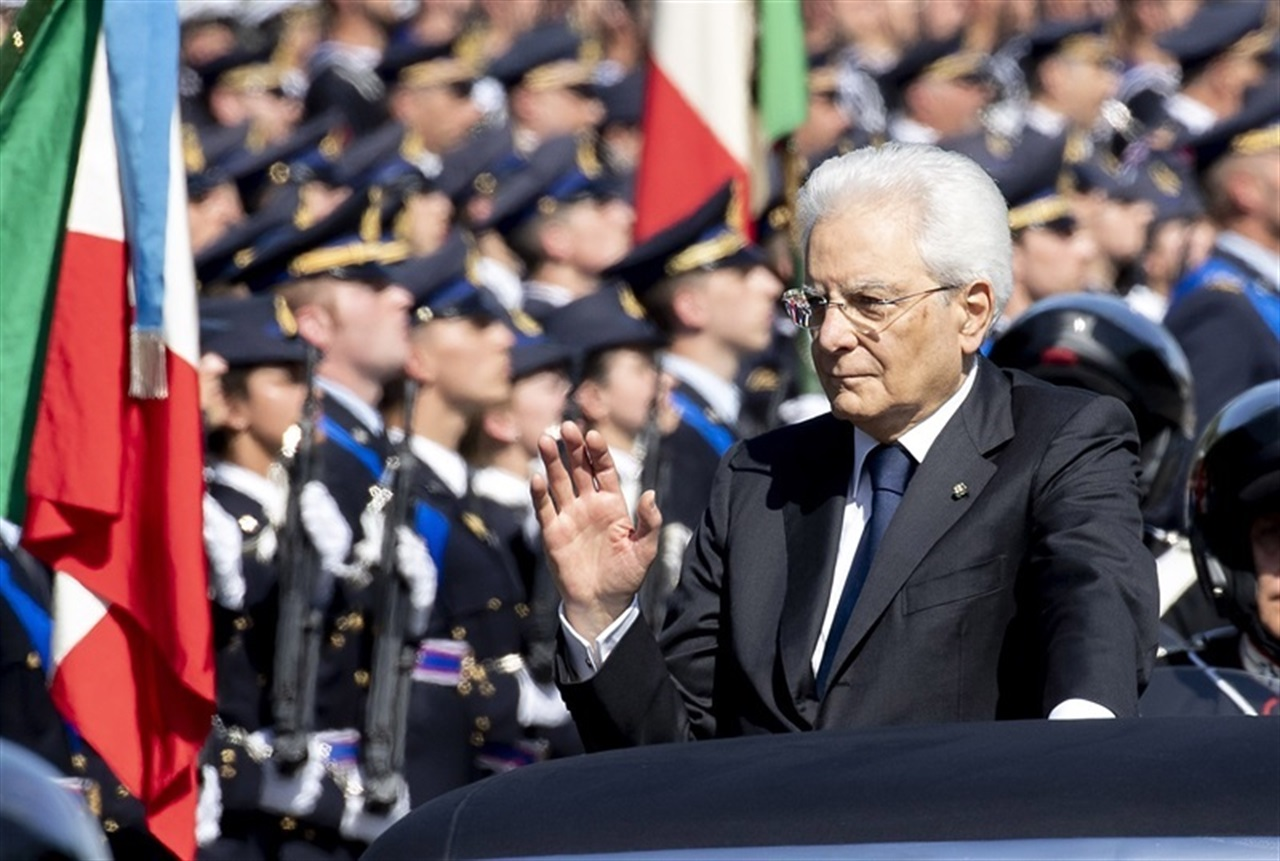
President of Italy Sergio Mattarella on the presidential car Lancia Flaminia during the military parade along Via dei Fori Imperiali in Rome during the Festa della Repubblica on 2 June 2018

Italy's National Day, the Festa della Repubblica (Republic Day), is celebrated on 2 June each year, with the main celebration taking place in Rome, and commemorates the birth of the Italian Republic in 1946. The ceremony of the event organized in Rome includes the deposition of a laurel wreath as a tribute to the Italian Unknown Soldier at the Altare della Patria by the President of the Italian Republic and a military parade along Via dei Fori Imperiali in Rome.

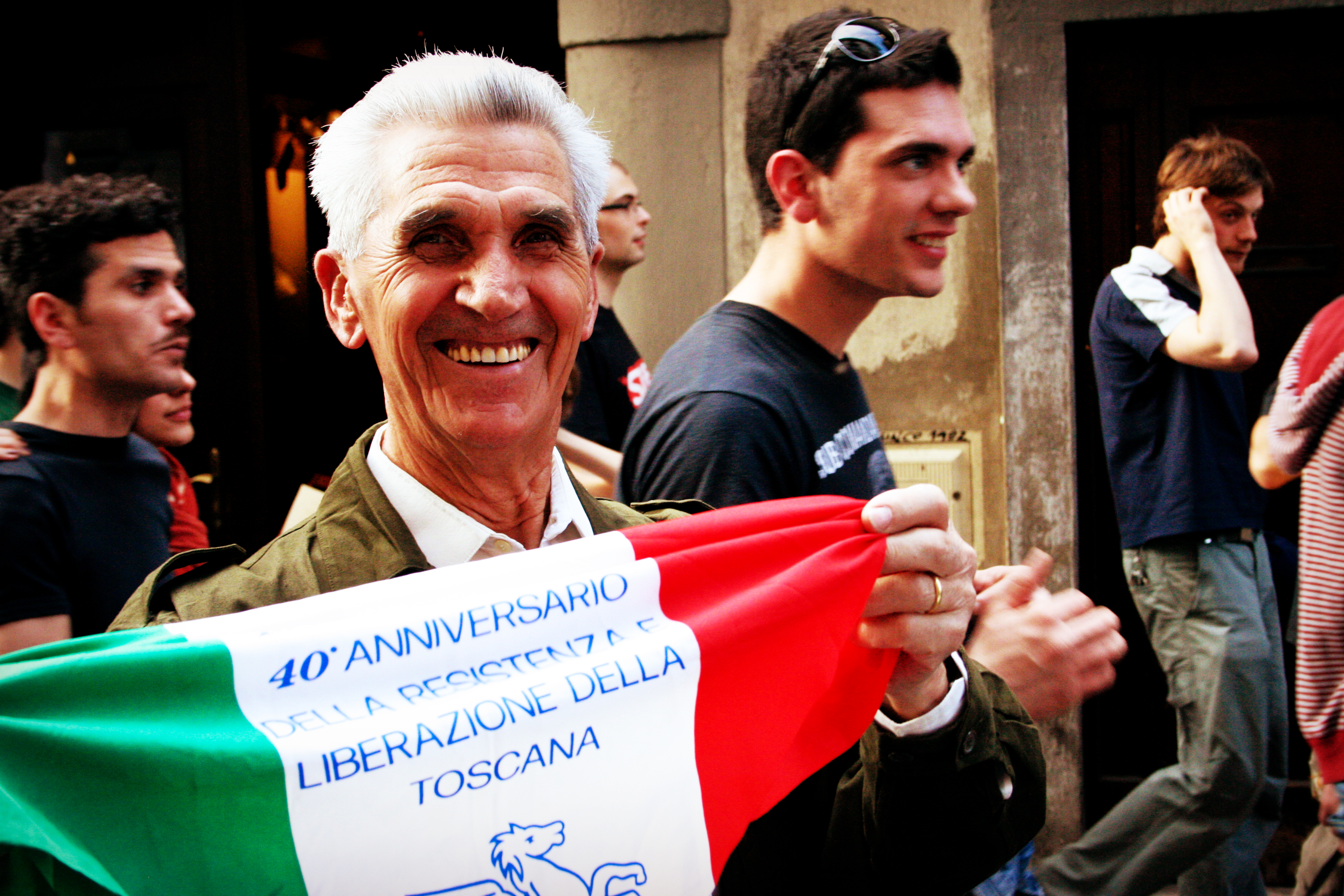
Anti-fascist demonstration on the occasion of the Liberation Day in Florence on 25 April 2009

Liberation Day is a national holiday in Italy that takes place on 25 April commemorating the victory of the Italian resistance movement against Nazi Germany and the Italian Social Republic, puppet state of the Nazis and rump state of the fascists, in the Italian Civil War, a civil war in Italy fought during World War II. The date was chosen by convention, as it was the day of the year in 1945 when the National Liberation Committee of Upper Italy (CLNAI) officially proclaimed the insurgency in a radio announcement, propounding the seizure of power by the CLNAI and proclaiming the death sentence for all fascist leaders (including Benito Mussolini, who was shot three days later).

17 March was proclaimed a national holiday in 1911, the 50th Anniversary of the Unification of Italy, in 1961, the 100th anniversary of the Unification of Italy, and in 2011, the 150th anniversary of the Unification of Italy. The law no. 222 of 23 November 2012 the Giornata dell'Unità nazionale, della Costituzione, dell'inno e della bandiera ("Day of National Unity, the Constitution, the anthem and the flag") was established to be celebrated on 17 March of each year, on the day of the proclamation of the Unification of Italy in 1861, however it is not to be considered a festive day.

Until 1977 the following were also considered public holidays in Italy for civil purposes:

- 19 March, Saint Joseph Day;
- 40 days after Easter, Ascension of Jesus;
- 60 days after Easter, Corpus Christi;
- 29 June, Saints Peter and Paul, patron saints of Rome (it remained a public holiday only in the municipality of Rome);
- 4 November, National Unity and Armed Forces Day.

These public holidays were suppressed, during the austerity caused by the 1973 oil crisis, on the basis of the law n. 54 of 5 March 1977. In particular, in 1977 National Unity and Armed Forces Day became a moveable feast, and celebrations occurred every first Sunday of November. National Unity and Armed Forces Day is an Italian national day since 1919 which commemorates the victory in World War I, a war event considered the completion of the process of unification of Italy. It is celebrated every 4 November, which is the anniversary of the armistice of Villa Giusti becoming effective in 1918 declaring Austria-Hungary's surrender. Italy entered World War I in 1915 with the aim of completing national unity and for this reason, the Italian intervention in World War I is also considered the Fourth Italian War of Independence, in a historiographical perspective that identifies in the latter the conclusion of the unification of Italy, whose military actions began during the revolutions of 1848 with the First Italian War of Independence.

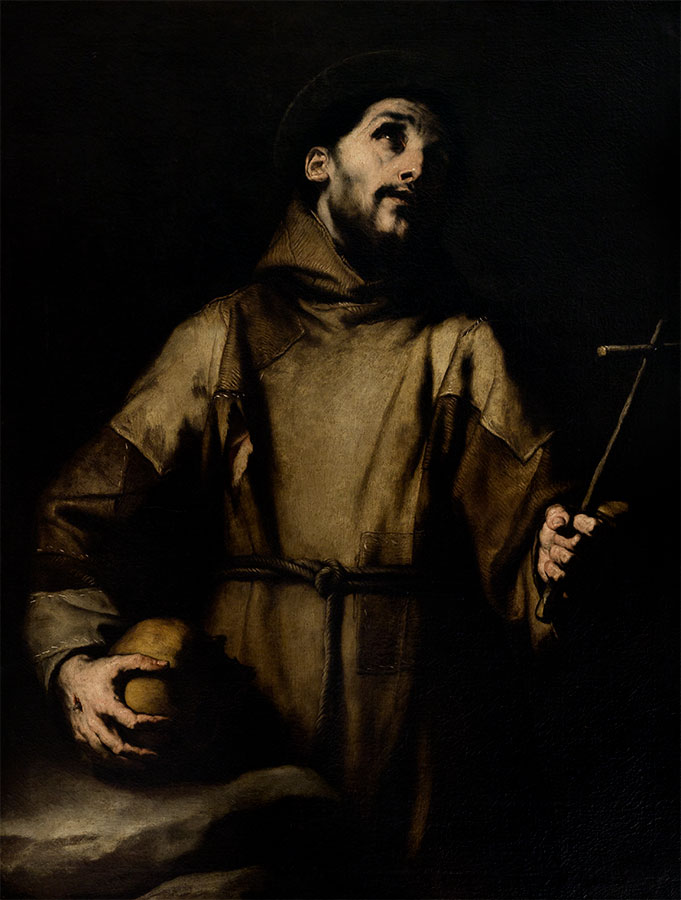
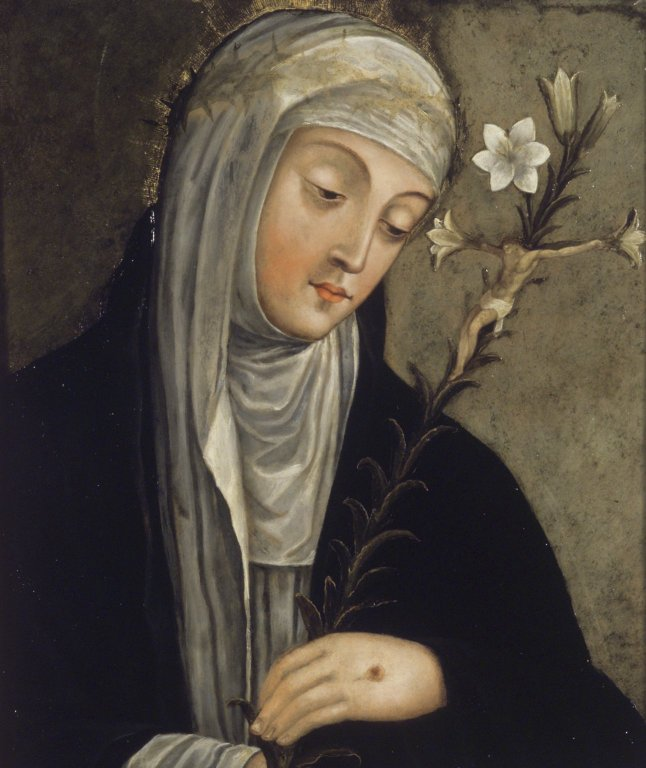
Francis of Assisi (left) and Catherine of Siena (right), Italian national patron saints. The Feast of Saints Francis and Catherine is dedicated to them.

In addition to the 12 national holidays, each city or town celebrates a public holiday on the occasion of the festival of the local patron saint. For example, Rome on 29 June (Saints Peter and Paul), Milan on 7 December (Saint Ambrose), Naples on 19 September (Saint Januarius), and Florence on 24 June (Saint John the Baptist); Venice celebrates on 21 November (Saint Mary of Health) because the patron day on 25 April (Saint Mark the Evangelist) is also the Liberation Day. In South Tyrol, the holiday is instead on Whit Monday. This makes the total public holidays in Italy 13.

This number does not correspond to the number of days off work as public holidays falling on weekends are not transferred. Instead, when a holiday falls on Sunday, Italian workers receive an extra paid day by law. When a holiday falls on a Tuesday or a Thursday, it is common practice to make a ponte (pl. ponti. English: "bridge") in order to have a long weekend. Schools are usually closed.

Christmas in Italy (in Italian: Natale) begins on 8 December, with the feast of the Immaculate Conception, the day on which traditionally the Christmas tree is mounted and ends on 6 January, of the following year with the Epiphany (in Italian: Epifania). The term "Natale" derives from the Latin natalis, which literally means "birth". Easter in Italy (Italian: Pasqua) is one of that country's major holidays. Easter in Italy enters Holy Week with Palm Sunday, Maundy Thursday, Good Friday and Holy Saturday, concluding with Easter Day and Easter Monday. Each day has a special significance.

During the Italian public holidays, peaks of tourist flows in Italy are recorded, particularly in winter due to the Christmas and New Year's Day holidays, in spring, due to the Easter holidays, and in summer, due to the favourable climate. For internal tourism, peaks of tourist flows are also recorded on the occasion of the three national civil holidays, Liberation Day (25 April), International Workers' Day (1 May) and the Republic Day (2 June), as well as for three religious holidays, the Ferragosto (15 August), All Saints' Day (1 November) and the Feast of the Immaculate Conception (8 December), especially in the presence of ponti.

In 2025, Italy moves to create the Feast of St Francis of Assisi as a public holiday.

== Current holidays ==
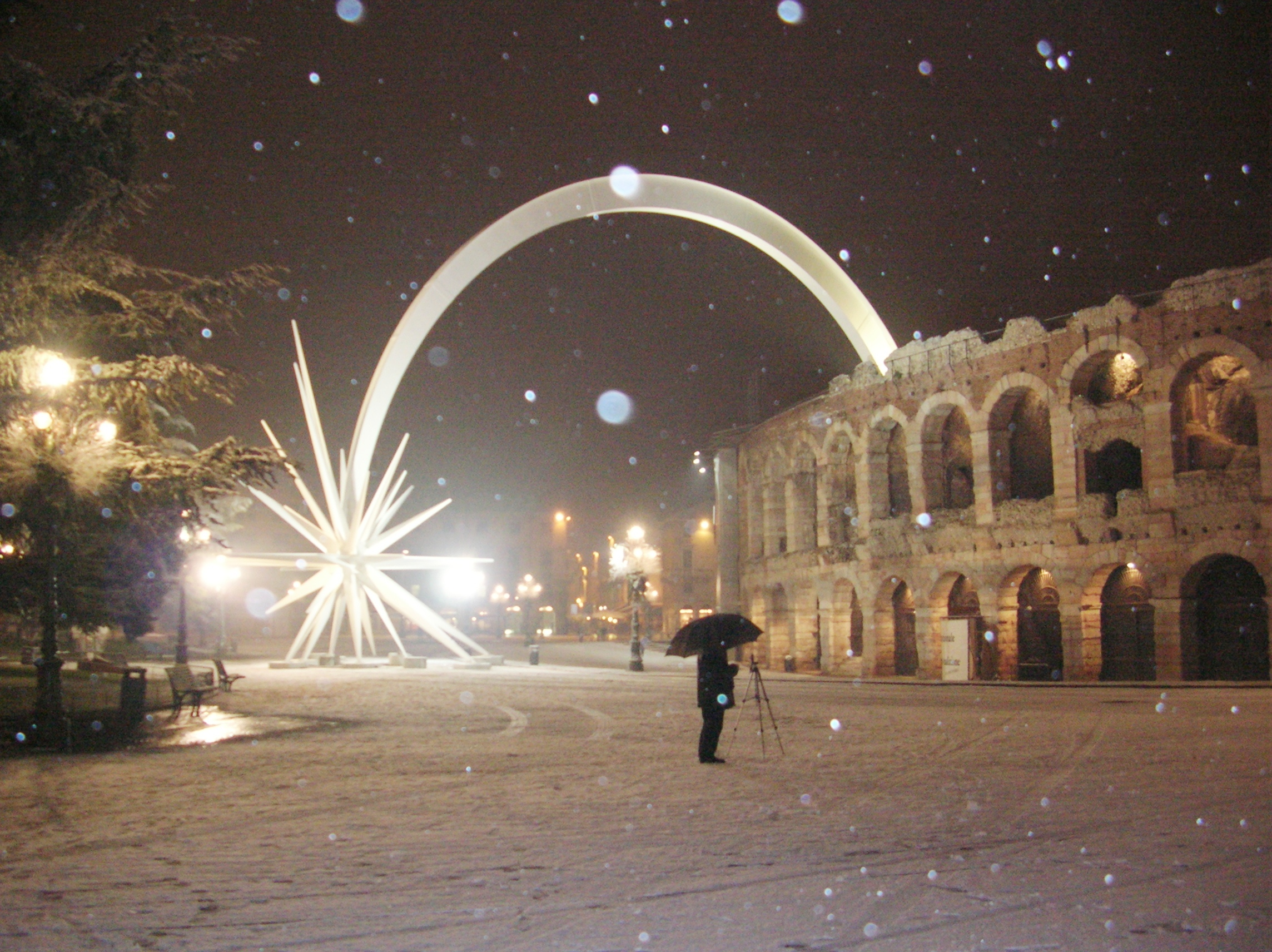
Christmas lights at Verona Arena in 2006

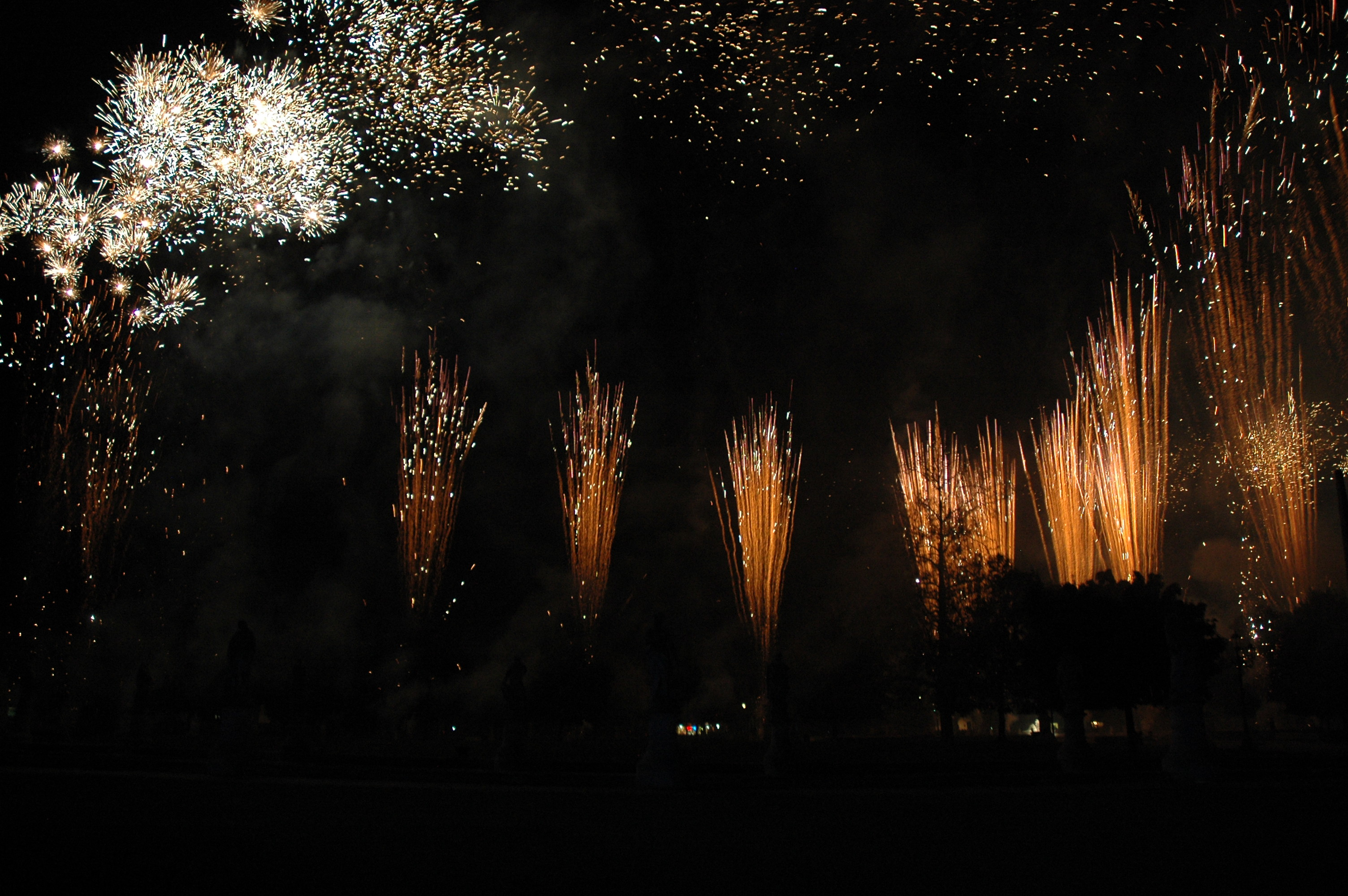
Ferragosto fireworks display in Padua on 15 August 2010

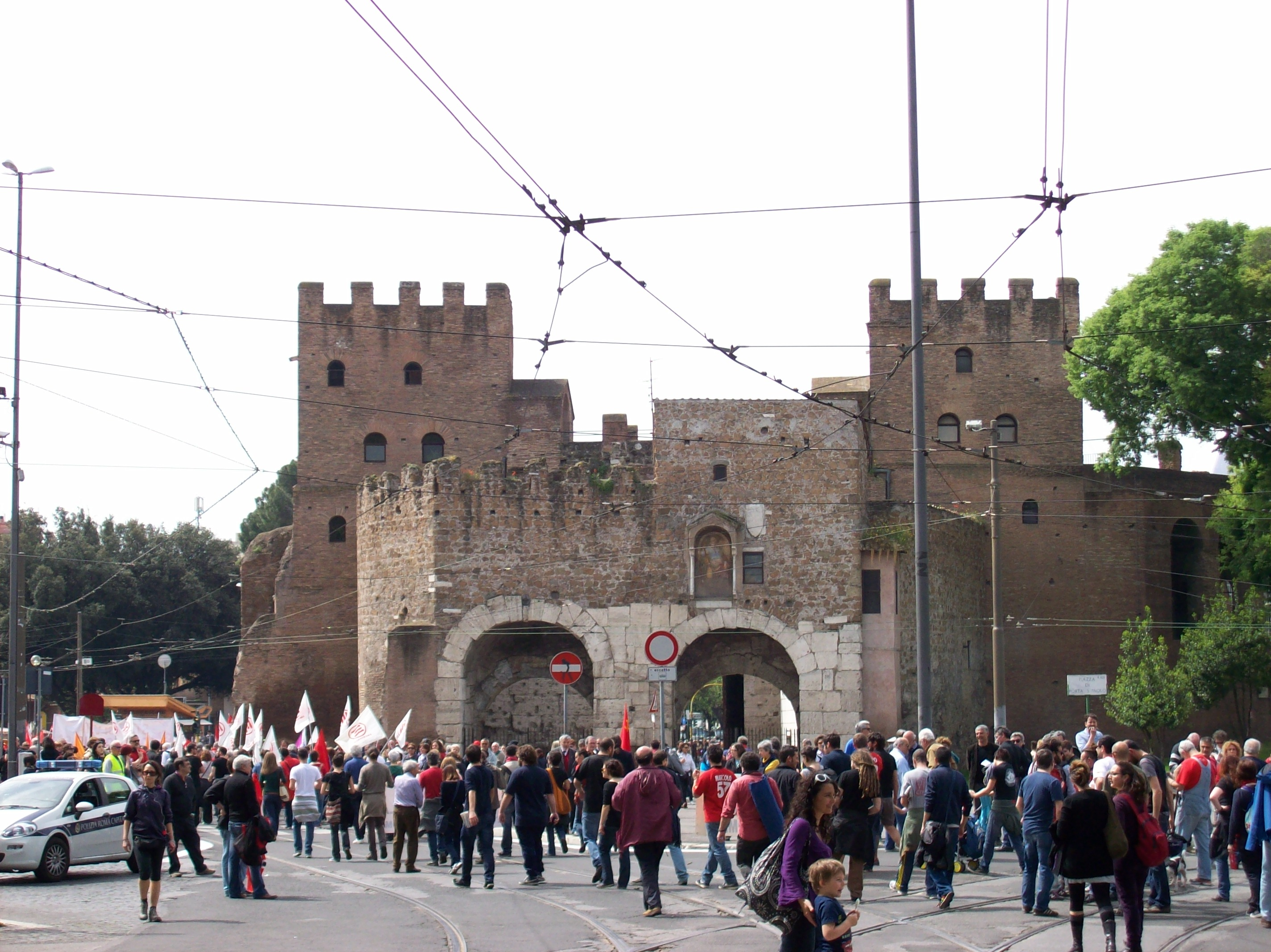
Anti-fascist demonstration at Porta San Paolo in Rome on the occasion of the Liberation Day on 25 April 2013

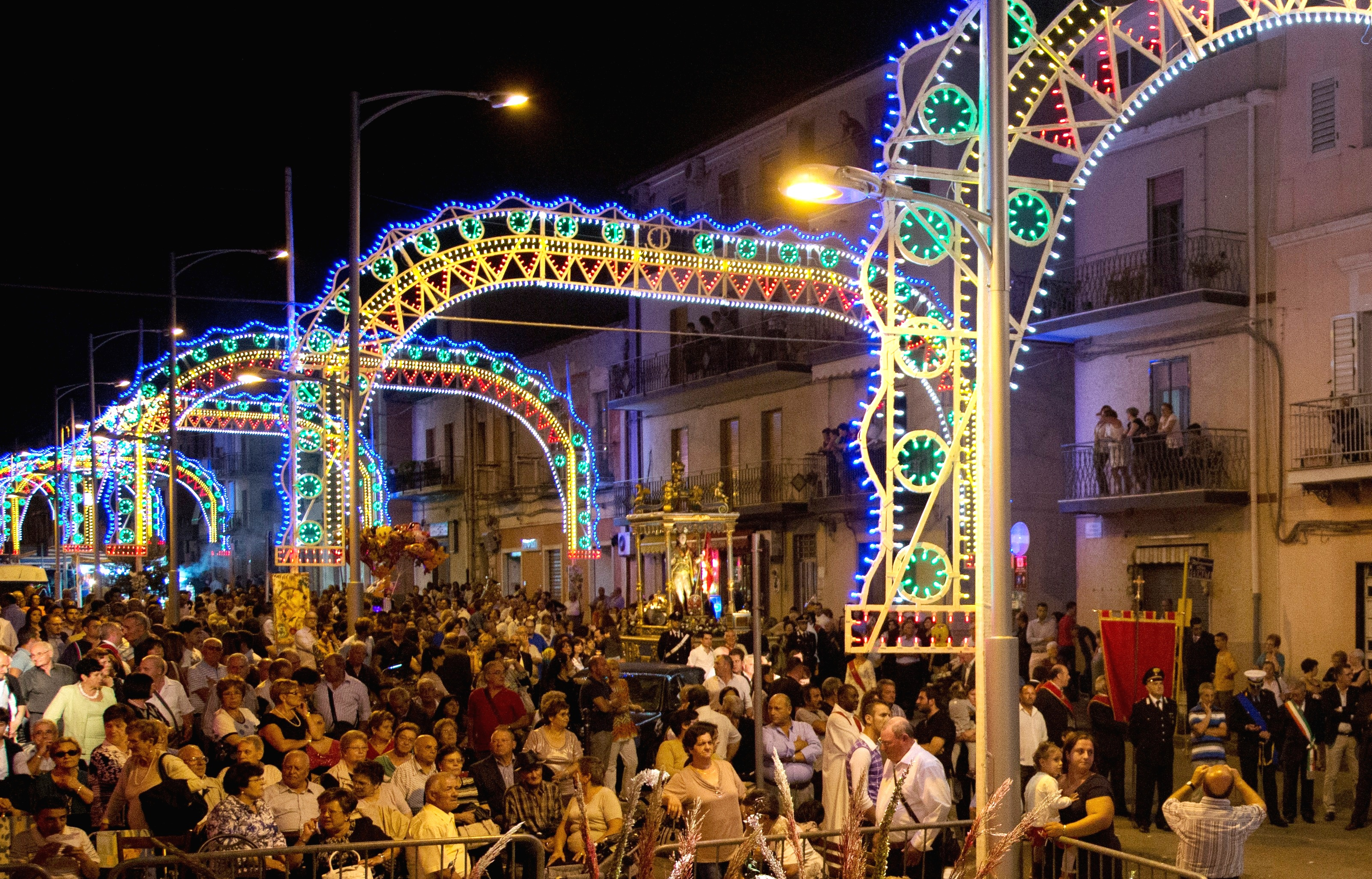
Patronal festival in Catenanuova, Sicily

Current holidays in Italy are:

Date	English Name	Italian Name	Remarks
Every Sunday including Easter (Note: It can fall between 22 March and 25 April)			In Italy, Sunday is always a public holiday (Note: So automatically Easter is a civil holiday due to the fact that it is always on Sunday.)
Variable (Note: The date depends on the saint's feast day, which is established by the calendar of saints. The date of the feast can be moved at the discretion of the comune.)	Patronal festival	Festa del santo patrono	Public holiday established by each comune limited to its own territory to celebrate the saint who has the role of patron saint of the municipality. Whit Sunday in South Tyrol and Saints Peter and Paul in Rome are fixed by law.
1 January	New Year's Day	Capodanno	
6 January	Epiphany	Epifania	
Monday after Easter	Easter Monday	Lunedì dell'Angelo, Lunedì in Albis or more commonly Pasquetta	
25 April	Liberation Day	Festa della Liberazione	The day commemorates the victory in 1945 of the Italian resistance movement against Nazi Germany and the Italian Social Republic, puppet state of the Nazis and rump state of the fascists, in the Italian Civil War, a civil war fought in Italy during World War II.
1 May	Labour Day	Festa del Lavoro (or Festa dei Lavoratori)	
2 June	Republic Day	Festa della Repubblica	The day commemorates the institutional referendum held by universal suffrage in 1946, in which the Italian people were called to the polls to decide on the form of government following World War II and the fall of Fascism. The day is one of the national symbols of Italy.
15 August	Assumption Day	Assunzione (Ferragosto)	
4 October	Feast of St Francis of Assisi	San Francesco d'Assisi	Patron saints of Italy.
1 November	All Saints' Day	Tutti i santi (or Ognissanti)	
8 December	Immaculate Conception	Immacolata Concezione (or just Immacolata)	
25 December	Christmas Day	Natale	
26 December	Saint Stephen's Day	Santo Stefano	In Italy, Saint Stephen's Day became a public holiday in 1947, where previously it was a normal working day; the Catholic Church also celebrates it as a religious holiday, even if not as a precept, as it is in Germany and other German-speaking countries. The reason for the public holiday in Italy, not required by the Catholic Church despite the fame of the saint, is to be found in the intention of prolonging the Christmas holiday, creating two consecutive public holidays, which also happens in the case of Easter Monday, a non-religious holiday, but which only wants to lengthen Easter. Before 1947 the two days were working days, with banks and offices open.

== State commemorations ==
The following days are not public holidays, but are nevertheless official State commemorations.

=== Civil solemnities ===
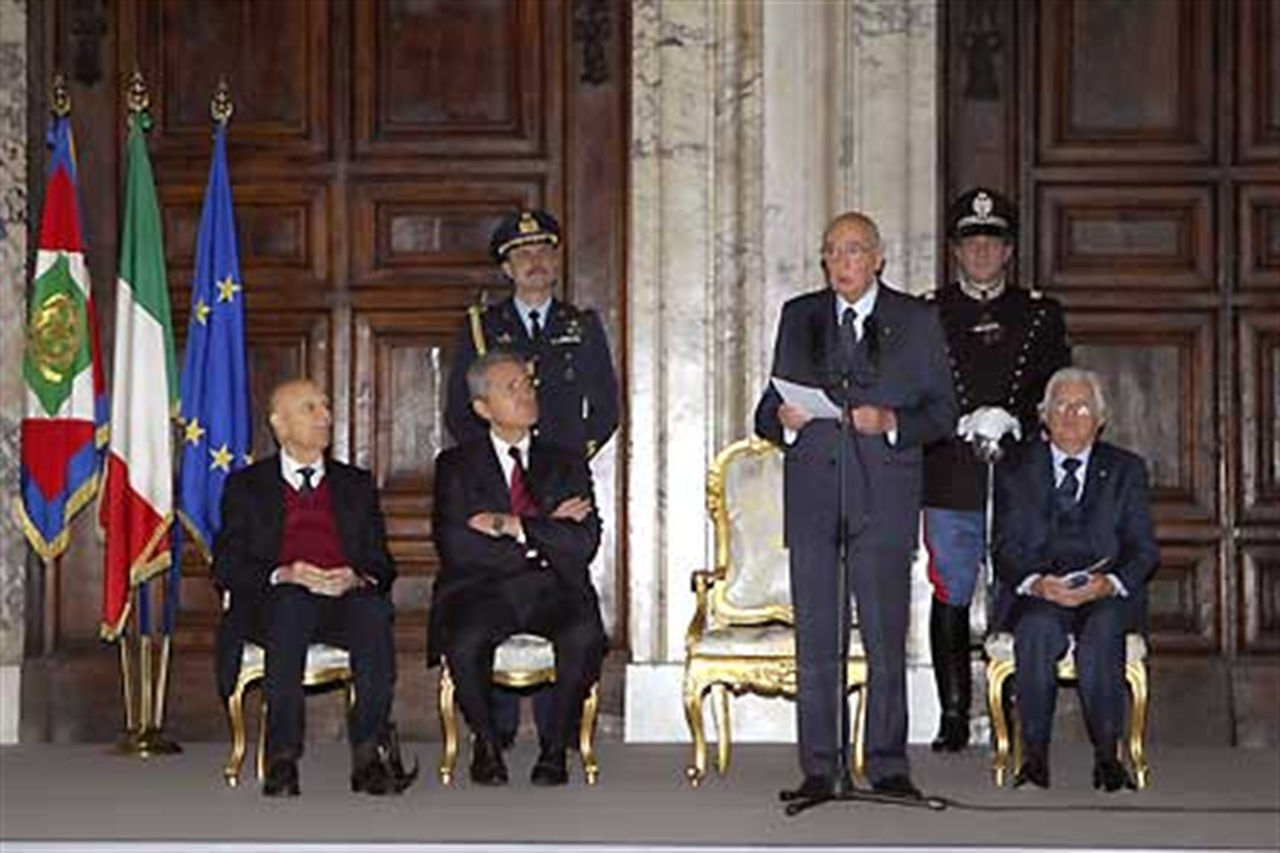
The former President of Italy Giorgio Napolitano during his speech for the National Memorial Day of the Exiles and Foibe on 10 February 2007

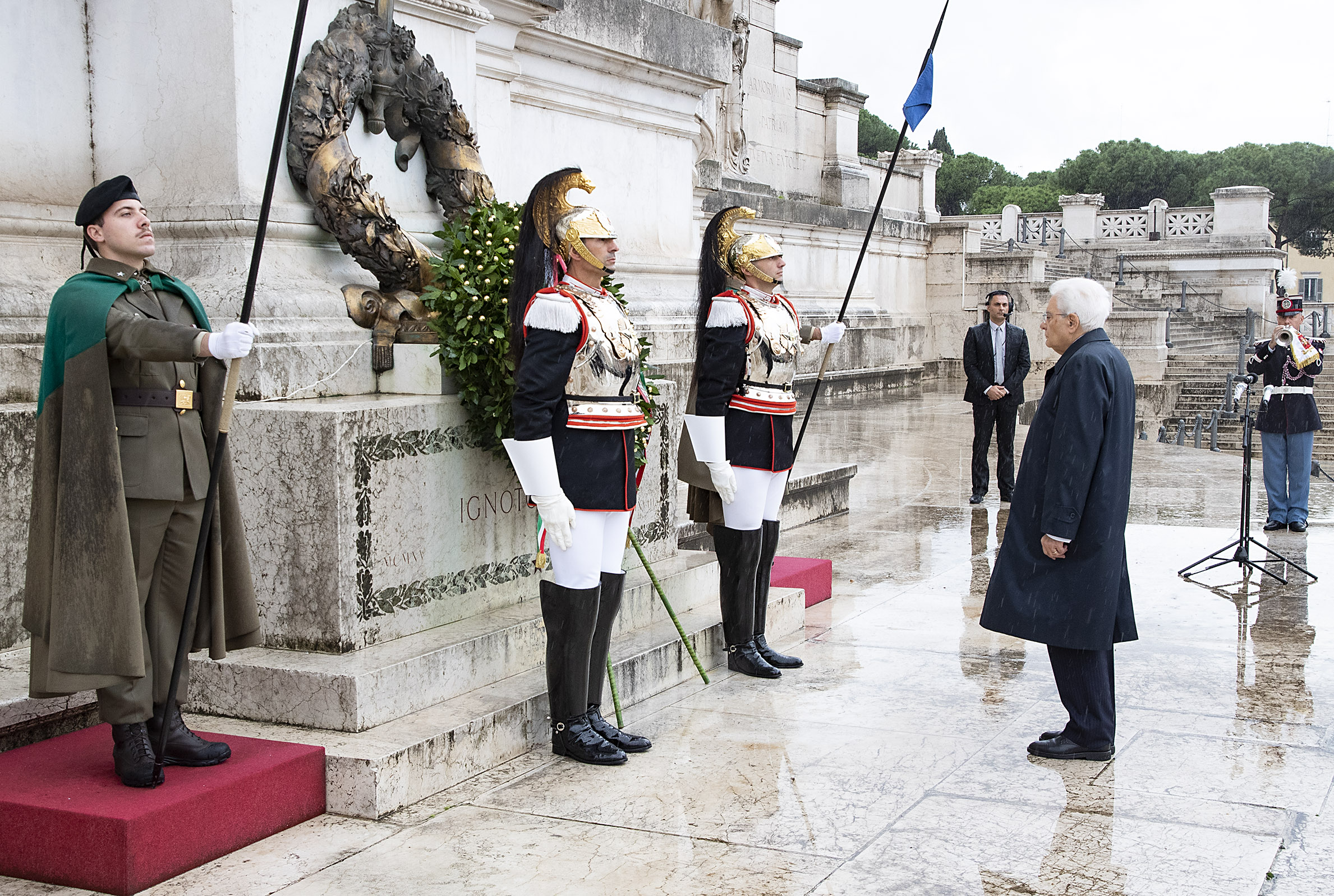
President of Italy Sergio Mattarella paying homage to the Italian Unknown Soldier at Altare della Patria in Rome during the National Unity and Armed Forces Day on 4 November 2022

Date	English Name	Italian Name	Remarks
10 February	National Memorial Day of the Exiles and Foibe	Giorno del ricordo	Made a national day by law no. 92 of 30 March 2004. It is an Italian celebration for the memory of the victims of the Foibe and the Istrian–Dalmatian exodus, which led to the emigration of hundreds of thousands (between 230,000 and 350,000) of local ethnic Italians (Istrian Italians and Dalmatian Italians) from Yugoslavia after the end of World War II.
11 February	Lateran Treaty Day	Patti Lateranensi	Treaty between the Kingdom of Italy and the Holy See establishing, among others, the recognition of the Vatican City as an independent state.
9 September	Day of Remembrance for Sailors Lost at Sea	Giornata della memoria dei marinai scomparsi in mare	Made a national day by law no. 204 of 14 December 2012.
28 September	Four Days of Naples Day	Insurrezione popolare di Napoli contro i nazifascisti or Quattro giornate di Napoli	It was an uprising in Naples against Nazi German occupation forces from 27 to 30 September 1943, immediately prior to the arrival of Allied forces in Naples on 1 October during World War II.
4 November	National Unity and Armed Forces Day	Giorno dell'Unità Nazionale e Festa delle Forze Armate	A public holiday from its inception in 1919 till 1977, it commemorates the victory of Italy in World War I, a war event considered the completion of the process of unification of Italy. It is celebrated every 4 November, which is the anniversary of the armistice of Villa Giusti becoming effective in 1918 declaring Austria-Hungary's surrender.
12 November	Remembrance day for military and civilian fallen in international peace missions	Giornata del ricordo dei Caduti militari e civili nelle missioni internazionali per la pace	Made a national day by law no. 162 of 12 November 2009.

=== Celebratory days ===
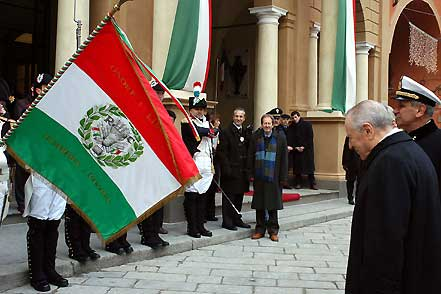
The former President of Italy Carlo Azeglio Ciampi honors the flag of Cispadane Republic, first Italian flag, during the Tricolour Day on 7 January 2004 in Reggio Emilia.

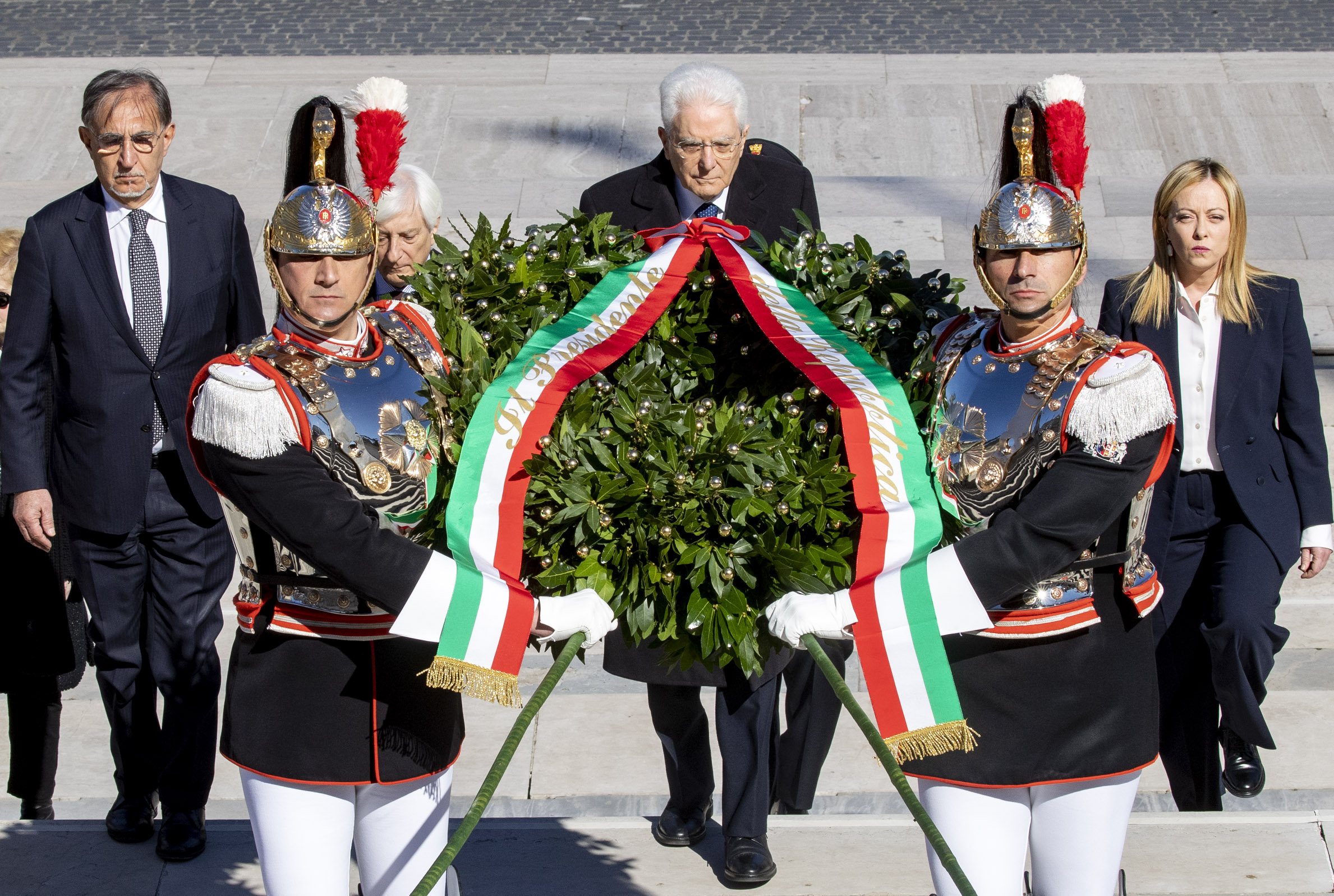
President of Italy Sergio Mattarella paying homage to the Italian Unknown Soldier at Altare della Patria in Rome during the Anniversary of the Unification of Italy on 17 March 2023

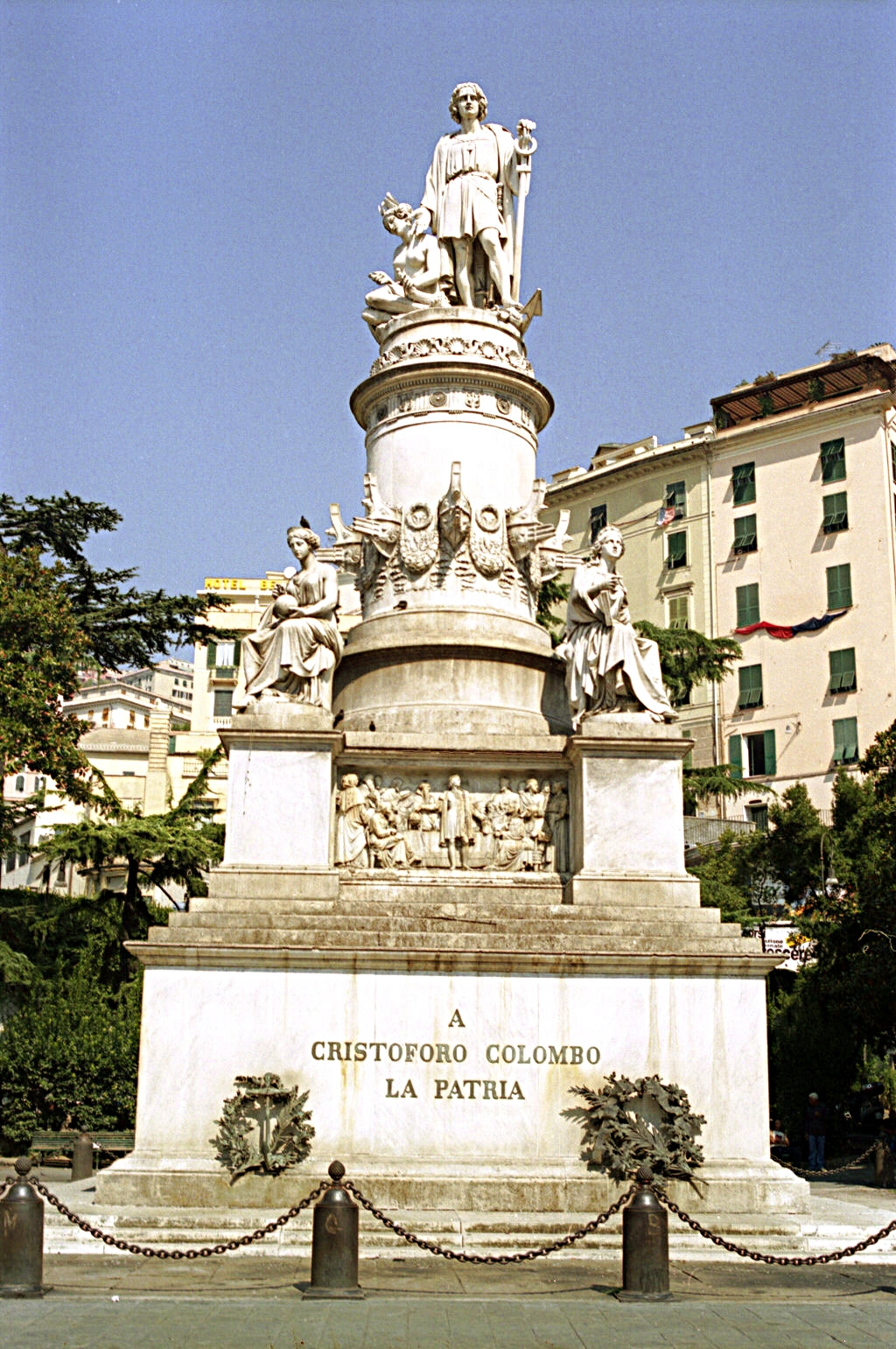
In Italy, Columbus Day has been officially celebrated since 2004 each 12 October. It is officially named Giornata nazionale di Cristoforo Colombo ("National Christopher Columbus Day").

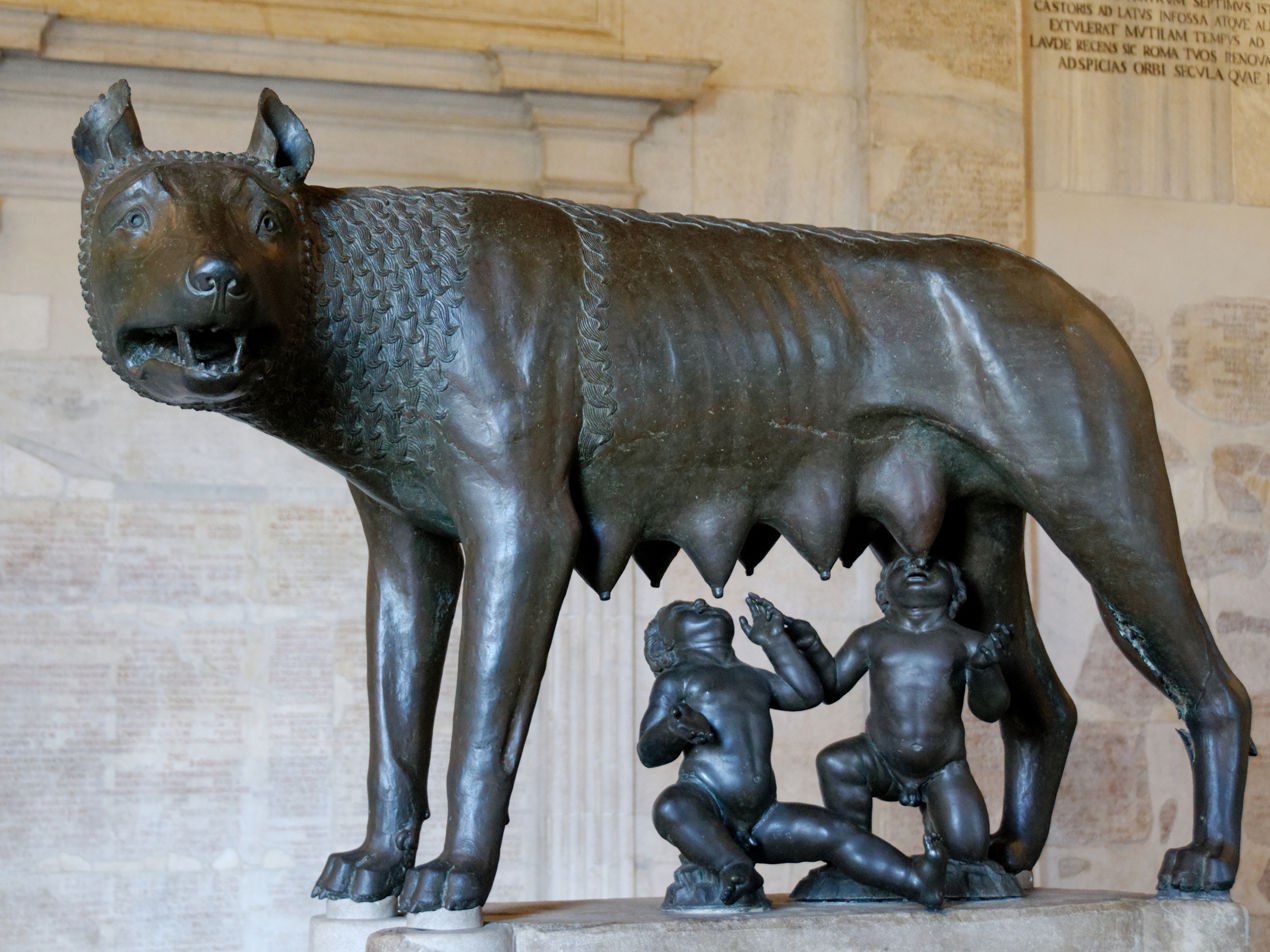
The Capitoline Wolf, now illustrating the legend that a she-wolf suckled Romulus and Remus after their mother's imprisonment in Alba Longa. Natale di Roma is a festival linked to the foundation of the city of Rome, celebrated on 21 April.

Date	English Name	Italian Name	Remarks
7 January	Tricolour Day	Festa del tricolore	Flag day made a national day by law no. 671 of 31 December 1996. The official celebration of the day is held in Reggio Emilia, the city where the Italian tricolour was first adopted as flag by an Italian sovereign state, the Cispadane Republic, on 7 January 1797.
26 January	National day of remembrance and sacrifice of the Alpini	Giornata nazionale della memoria e del sacrificio degli Alpini	Made a national day by law no. 44 of 5 May 2022.
27 January	International Holocaust Remembrance Day	Giorno della Memoria	Made a national day by law no. 211 of 20 July 2000. It is an international memorial day that commemorates the victims of the Holocaust, which resulted in the murder of one third of the Jewish people, along with countless members of other minorities between 1933 and 1945 by Nazi Germany, an attempt to implement their "final solution" to the Jewish question.
1 February	National day of civilian victims of wars and conflicts in the world	Giornata nazionale delle vittime civili delle guerre e dei conflitti nel mondo	Made a national day by law no. 9 of 25 January 2017.
20 February	National day of health, social and social care and voluntary workers	Giornata nazionale del personale sanitario, sociosanitario, socioassistenziale e del volontariato	Made a national day by law no. 155 of 13 November 2020.
21 February	National Braille Day	Giornata nazionale del Braille	Made a national day by law no. 126 of 3 August 2007.
6 March	Day of the Righteous of Humanity	Giornata dei Giusti dell'umanità	Made a national day by law no. 212 of 20 December 2017.
17 March	Anniversary of the Unification of Italy	Anniversario dell'Unità d'Italia	The day celebrates the birth of Italy as a modern nation state, which took place following the proclamation of the Kingdom of Italy on 17 March 1861. However, the complete unification of Italy took place only in the following years. 17 March was proclaimed a national holiday in 1911, the 50th Anniversary of the Unification of Italy, in 1961, the 100th Anniversary of the Unification of Italy, and in 2011, the 150th Anniversary of the Unification of Italy. With the law no. 222 of 23 November 2012 the Giornata dell'Unità nazionale, della Costituzione, dell'inno e della bandiera ("Day of National Unity, the Constitution, the anthem and the flag") was established to be celebrated on 17 March of each year, on the day of the proclamation of the Unification of Italy in 1861, however it is not to be considered a day festive.
18 March	National day in memory of the victims of the coronavirus epidemic	Giornata nazionale in memoria delle vittime dell'epidemia di coronavirus	Made a national day by law no. 35 of 18 March 2021.
21 March	National day of memory and commitment in remembrance of the victims of the mafia	Giornata nazionale della memoria e dell'impegno in ricordo delle vittime delle mafie	Made a national day by law no. 20 of 8 March 2017.
21 April	Natale di Roma	Natale di Roma	It is a festival linked to the foundation of the city of Rome. According to legend, Romulus is said to have founded the city of Rome on 21 April 21, 753 BC. From this date, the Roman chronology derived its system, known by the Latin phrase Ab Urbe condita, meaning "from the founding of the City", which counted the years from this presumed foundation.
22 April	Earth Day	Giornata della Terra	Earth Day is an international annual event on 22 April to demonstrate support for environmental protection. First held on 22 April 1970, it now includes a wide range of events coordinated globally by EarthDay.org (formerly Earth Day Network). including 1 billion people in more than 193 countries.
5 May	National day against pedophilia and child pornography	Giornata nazionale contro la pedofilia e la pedopornografia	Made a national day by law no. 41 of 4 May 2009.
9 May	Remembrance day dedicated to victims of terrorism	Giorno della memoria dedicato alle vittime del terrorismo	Made a national day by law no. 56 of 4 May 2007.
9 May	Europe Day	Giornata dell'Europa	Europe Day is a day celebrating "peace and unity in Europe" celebrated on 5 May by the Council of Europe and on 9 May by the European Union.
14 June	World Blood Donor Day	Giornata mondiale del donatore di sangue	World Blood Donor Day is held on 14 June each year. The event was organised for the first time in 2005, by a joint initiative of the World Health Organization, the International Federation of Red Cross and Red Crescent Societies to raise awareness of the need for safe blood and blood products, and to thank blood donors for their voluntary, life-saving donations of blood.
2 October	Grandparents' Day	Festa dei nonni	Made a national day by law no. 159 of 31 July 2005.
3 October	National day in memory of the victims of immigration	Giornata nazionale in memoria delle vittime dell'immigrazione	Made a national day by law no. 45 of 21 March 2016.
4 October	World Animal Day	Giornata mondiale degli animali	World Animal Day is an international day of action for animal rights and welfare celebrated annually on 4 October, the feast day of Francis of Assisi, the patron saint of animals.
9 October	National day in memory of the victims of environmental and industrial disasters caused by human negligence	Giornata nazionale in memoria delle vittime dei disastri ambientali e industriali causati dall'incuria dell'uomo	Made a national day by law no. 101 of 4 June 2011.
12 October	Columbus Day	Giornata nazionale di Cristoforo Colombo	In Italy, Columbus Day has been officially celebrated since 2004. Since the 18th century, many Italian communities in the Americas have observed the Discovery of the New World as a celebration of their heritage, since Columbus was born in Republic of Genoa, nowadays Italy.
24 October	United Nations Day	Giornata delle Nazioni Unite	United Nations Day is an annual commemorative day, reflecting the official creation of the United Nations on 24 October 1945. In 1947, the United Nations General Assembly declared 24 October, the anniversary of the Charter of the United Nations, to "be devoted to making known to the people of the world the aims and achievements of the United Nations and to gaining their support for" its work.
24 October	National day of entertainment	Giornata nazionale dello spettacolo	Made a national day by law no. 164 of 28 October 2021.
9 November	Freedom day	Giorno della libertà	Made a national day by law no. 61 of 15 April 2005.
21 November	National Tree Day	Giornata nazionale degli alberi	Made a national day by law no. 10 of 14 January 2013.
25 November	International Day for the Elimination of Violence against Women	Giornata internazionale per l'eliminazione della violenza contro le donne	The United Nations General Assembly has designated 25 November as the International Day for the Elimination of Violence against Women (Resolution 54/134). The premise of the day is to raise awareness around the world that women are subjected to rape, domestic violence and other forms of violence; furthermore, one of the aims of the day is to highlight that the scale and true nature of the issue is often hidden.
Third Sunday of November	National day in memory of road victims	Giornata nazionale in memoria delle vittime della strada	Made a national day by law no. 227 of 29 December 2017.
1 December	World AIDS Day	Giornata mondiale contro l'AIDS	World AIDS Day, designated on 1 December every year since 1988, is an international day dedicated to raising awareness of the AIDS pandemic caused by the spread of HIV infection and mourning those who have died of the disease.

== See also ==
- Culture of Italy
- Christmas in Italy
- Ferragosto
- Traditions of Italy
