= Public holiday =

General holiday established by law

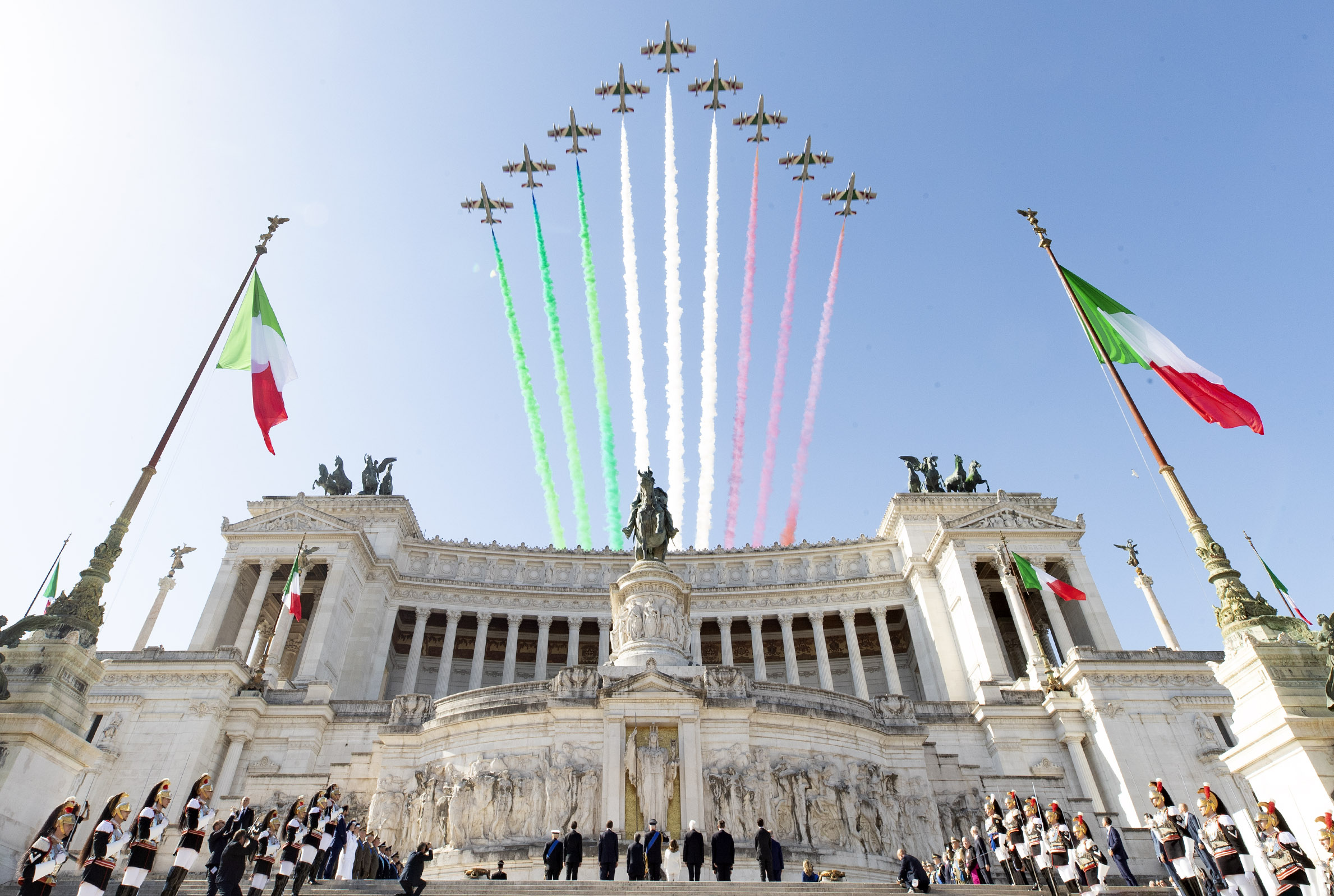
The Frecce Tricolori, with the smoke trail representing the national colours of Italy, above the Victor Emmanuel II Monument in Rome during the celebrations of the Festa della Repubblica, an Italian public holiday and Italy's National Day

A public holiday, national holiday, federal holiday, statutory holiday, bank holiday or legal holiday is a holiday generally established by law and is usually a non-working day during the year.

== Types ==
=== Civic holiday ===
A civic holiday, also known as a civil holiday or work holiday, is a day that is legally recognized and celebrated as a holiday in a particular sovereign state or jurisdictional subdivision of such, e.g., a state or a province. It is usually a day that the legislature, parliament, congress or sovereign has declared by statute, edict or decree as a non-working day when the official arms of government such as the court system are closed. In federal states there may also be different holidays for the constituent states or provinces, as in the United States, where holidays that were established by the federal government are called federal holidays. Such days may or may not be counted in calculating the statute of limitations in legal actions and are usually days when non-custodial parents are given alternating visitation or access to their children from a prior marriage or relationship according to a parenting schedule.

The term may also be used to distinguish between days that may be celebrated as secular holidays rather than religious holidays such as the celebration of New Year's Day on January 1 (Gregorian calendar) and January 14 (Julian Calendar) in certain eastern Orthodox Christian countries such as Russia.

=== Bank holiday ===
In the United Kingdom, bank holidays are days established as public holidays in statute law. In England and Wales, Good Friday and Christmas Day are known as common law holidays, as they have been celebrated by custom since time immemorial. Bank holidays were introduced in the late 19th century to extend the labour rights citizens have on common law holidays to four additional days.

In Ireland, public holidays are sometimes colloquially referred to as "bank holidays".

== Impacts ==
The major social function of public holidays is the co-ordination of leisure time. This co-ordination has costs, such as congestion and overcrowding (in leisure facilities, on transport systems) and benefits (easier for people to arrange social occasions).

Public holidays constitute an important part of nation building and become important symbols of the nation. They can build and legitimise the nation and are intended to foster national unity, social cohesion and popular identification. They provide national governments with annual opportunities to reinforce the status of the nation. Sabine Marschall argues that public holidays can be regarded as sites of memory, which preserve particular representations of historical events and particular national or public heroes.

== By country ==
In some countries, there are national laws that make some or all public holidays paid holidays, and in other countries, there are no such laws, though many firms provide days off as paid or unpaid holidays.

They vary by country and may vary by year. With 36 days a year, Nepal is the country with the highest number of public holidays. India ranks second with 21 national holidays, followed by Colombia and the Philippines at 18 each. Likewise, Japan, China and Hong Kong enjoy 17 public breaks a year. Some countries (e.g. Cambodia) with a longer, six-day workweek, have more holidays (28) to compensate.

=== Italy ===
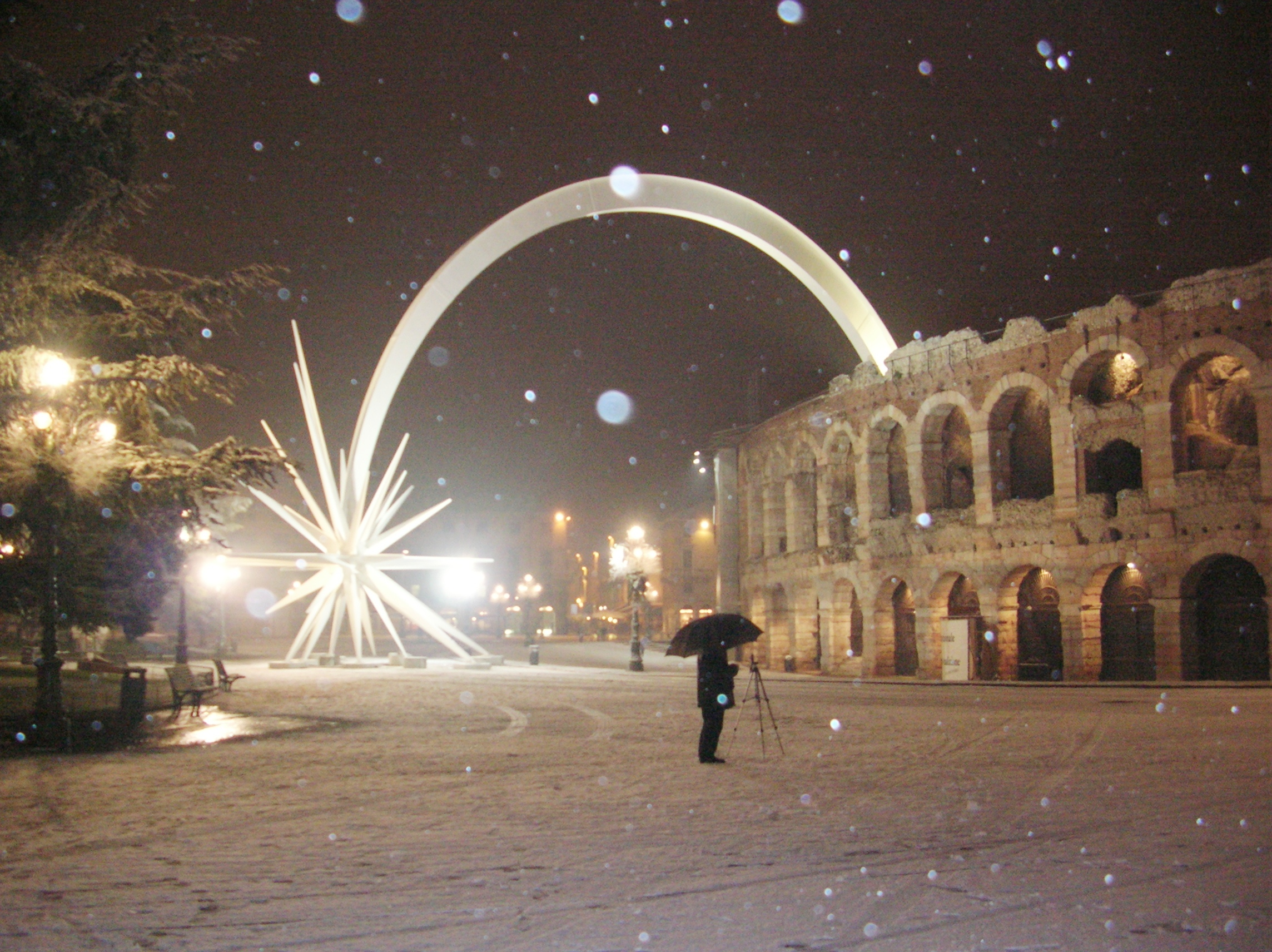
Christmas lights at Verona Arena in 2006 Christmas in Italy (in Italian: Natale) begins on 8 December, with the feast of the Immaculate Conception, the day on which traditionally the Christmas tree is mounted and ends on 6 January, of the following year with the Epiphany (in Italian: Epifania).

Public holidays in Italy are established by the Italian parliament and, with the exception of city or community patronal days, apply nationwide. These include a mix of national, religious and local observances. As for Whit Monday, there is an exception for South Tyrol. In Italy there are also State commemoration days, which are not public holidays.

=== New Zealand ===
In New Zealand, a national law sets 12 paid public holidays. If a worker works on a public holiday, they are to be paid 1.5 times their regular rate of pay and be given another alternate day off.

=== South Africa ===
Sabie Marschall argues that the revised set of public holidays in post-Apartheid South Africa attempts to produce and celebrate a particular national identity in line with the political goal of the rainbow nation.

=== United States ===
In the United States, there is no national law requiring that employers pay employees who do not work on public holidays (although the U.S. states of Rhode Island and Massachusetts have paid holiday laws).

== Controversial holidays ==
=== Columbus Day ===
Some public holidays are controversial. For example, in the United States a federal holiday commemorates explorer Christopher Columbus, who is said to have discovered the Americas by Europeans. This has led to protests at Columbus Day parades and calls for the public holiday to be changed. Some states have adopted the day as Indigenous People's Day rather than Columbus Day.

=== Australia Day ===
Similarly, Australia Day commemorates the day when the First Fleet first arrived in the country on 26 January 1788 at Sydney Cove. This has also led to protests, with some Australians seeing the date as a symbol of the beginning of European oppression towards the indigenous population. The holiday has since garnered the nickname 'Invasion Day'. Although the national date has not been changed, many Australia Day staples, such as citizenship ceremonies and Triple J's Hottest 100, have nonetheless been moved to alternative dates.

== See also ==
- Bank holiday
- List of holidays by country
- Category:Lists of public holidays by country
