= National colours of Italy =

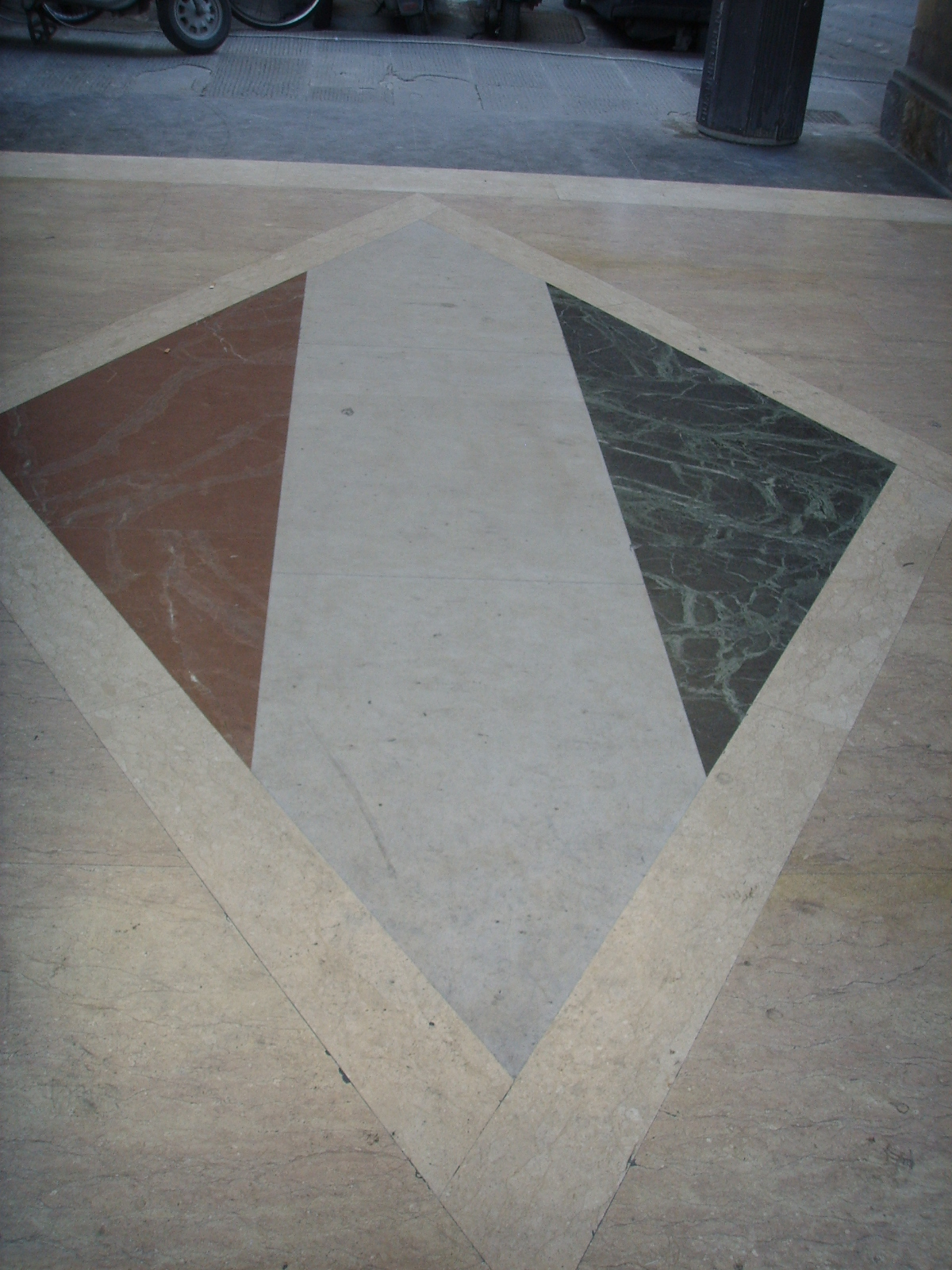
The three Italian national colours carved on the floor of the Palazzo delle Poste in Florence. After their appearance in Genoa on 21 August 1789, red, white and green gradually became part of the Italian collective imagination until they were represented in the most varied areas.

The national colours of Italy are green, white, and red, collectively known in Italian as il Tricolore (pronounced [il trikoˈloːre]; lit. 'the Tricolour'). The three Italian national colours appeared for the first time in Genoa on 21 August 1789, on the cockade of Italy shortly after the outbreak of the French Revolution; on 11 October 1796, they were used for the first time in Milan on a military banner, while on 7 January 1797, in Reggio Emilia, they appeared for the first time on a flag.

During sporting events, it is instead common to use Savoy azure, a shade of blue that was adopted for the first time in 1910 on the uniforms of the Italy national football team and which owes its name to the fact that it is the colour of House of Savoy, the ruling dynasty in Italy from 1861 to 1946. It became a national colour with the unification of Italy (1861), and its use continued even after Italy became a republic (1946).

The national auto racing colour of Italy is instead rosso corsa ("racing red"), while in other disciplines such as cycling and winter sports, white is often used.

== History ==
=== The hypotheses rejected by historians ===
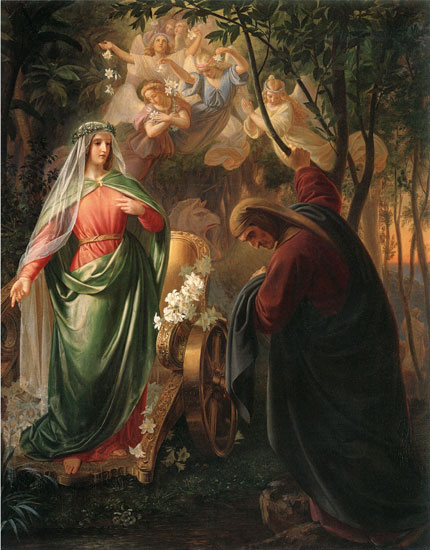
Dante and Beatrice by Carl Oesterley (1845), represented as described by Dante in canto XXX of the Purgatorio of the Divine Comedy. On the left, we can see Beatrice's green, white and red dress.

Despite attempts to link the modern combination of green, white and red to medieval times, there are no sources that prove this. The three colours were present in some historical events, such as;

- The flagpole of the Carroccio during the battle of Legnano
- The banners of the Tuscan Guelphs, whose coat of arms was a red eagle on a white field above a green snake, a charge that was granted by Pope Clement IV,
- On the sign of the Sienese contrada of the Goose
- On the tricolour uniforms of the servants of the Duchess of Milan Valentina Visconti
- In Renaissance times the Italian national colours were imagined on the carpets that welcomed Renée of France, who then married Ercole I d'Este, upon her arrival in Ferrara
- On the tricolour uniforms of Borso d'Este's army
- On the green flag, white and red that began to enshrine from the Cathedral of Milan on the occasion of the entry into the Milanese capital of Francis I of France after his victory in the battle of Marignano.

Other scholars have suggested the prefiguration of the Italian tricolour in pictorial works; in fact the clothes of some characters painted on the walls of Palazzo Schifanoia in Ferrara, which date back to the Middle Ages, are green, white and red.

The reason for the historical inconsistency of the hypothetical presence of the tricolour in historical events and artistic works prior to the modern era lies in the fact that at the time the Italian national awareness, which appeared centuries later, had not yet occurred.

The three colours of the Italian flag are cited, in literature, in some verses of canto XXX of the Purgatorio in the Divine Comedy, and this has fuelled theories that would link the birth of the tricolour to Dante Alighieri. They too are considered groundless by scholars, as Dante in these verses did not think of a politically united Italy, but of the theological virtues, or rather of charity, hope and faith, with the last two being metaphorically symbolized in the Italian flag.

=== Origins of the Italian tricolour ===
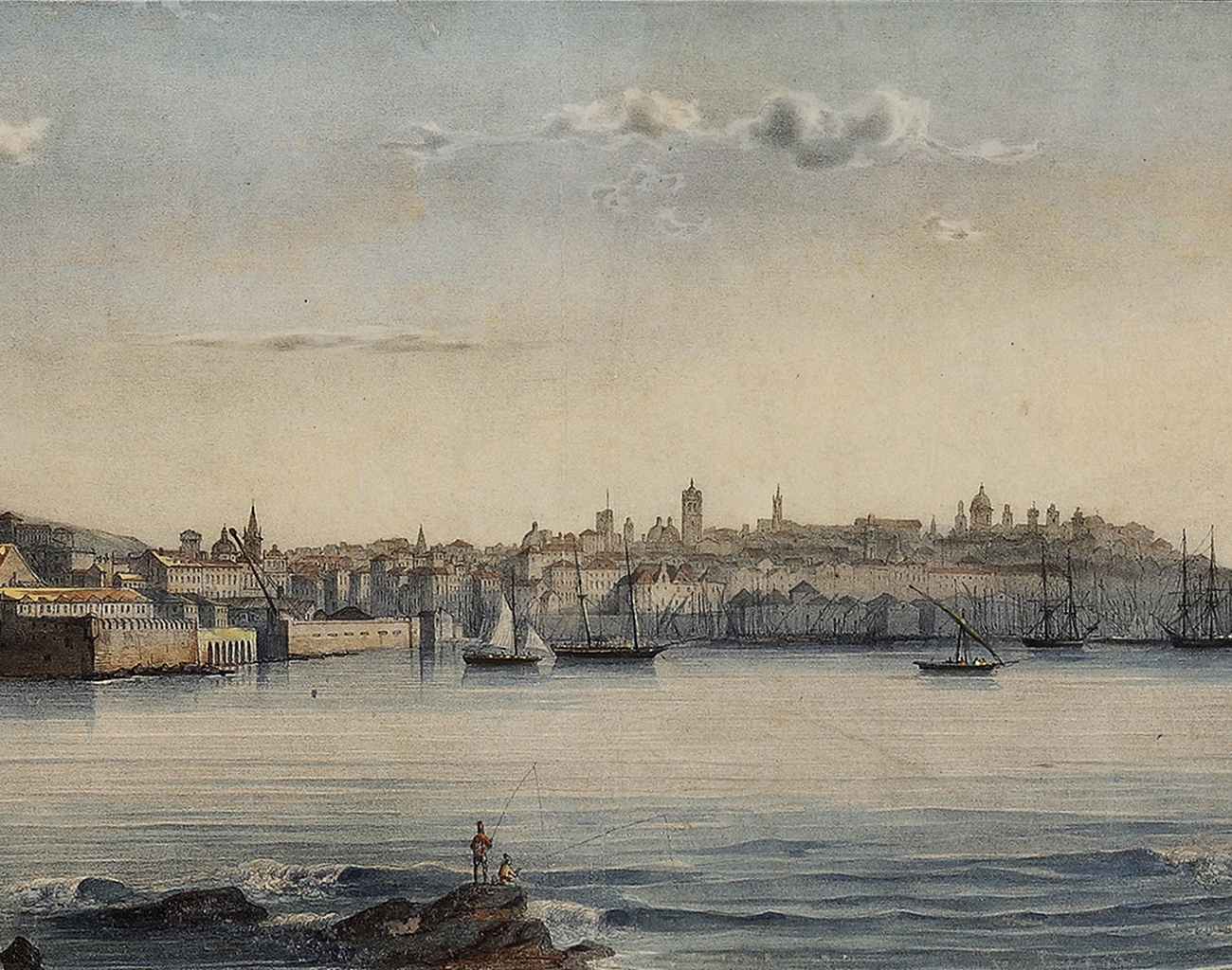
Panorama of Genoa in the early 19th century. Here the Italian tricolour cockade first appeared, and with it the Italian national colours.

The national cockade of Italy, on which the three Italian national colours made their debut in 1789

The tricolore was symbolically important preceding and throughout the Risorgimento leading to Italian unification.

The first documented trace of the use of Italian national colours is dated 21 August 1789: in the historical archives of the Republic of Genoa it is reported that eyewitnesses had seen some demonstrators pinned on their clothes hanging a red, white and green cockade on their clothes. The Italian gazettes of the time had in fact created confusion about the facts of French Revolution, especially on the replacement of green with blue, reporting the news that the French tricolour was green, white and red.

The green, in the primitive French cockade, was immediately abandoned in favour of blue and red, or the ancient colours of Paris, because it was also the colour of the king's brother, Count of Artois, who became monarch after the First Restoration with the name of Charles X of France. The French tricolour cockade was then completed on 17 July 1789 with the addition of white, the colour of the House of Bourbon, in deference to King Louis XVI of France, who still ruled despite the violent revolts that raged in the country; the French monarchy was in fact abolished on 10 August 1792.

When the correct information on the chromatic composition of the French tricolour arrived in Italy, the Italian Jacobins decided to keep green instead of blue, because it represented nature and therefore metaphorically, also natural rights, or social equality and freedom.

In September 1794, Luigi Zamboni and Giambattista de Rolandis created a cockade by uniting the white and red of the flag of Bologna with green, a symbol of liberty and hope that the populace of Italy join the revolution begun in Bologna to oust the foreign occupying forces. This tricolore was considered a symbol of redemption that from its creation was "consecrated to immortality of the triumph of faith, virtue, and sacrifice" of those who created it.

Flag of the Cispadane Republic, established on 7 January 1797. It was the first Italian tricolour flag.

Napoleon Bonaparte, in a letter from Milan to an executive director on 11 October 1796, stated that the Legione Lombarda had chosen these colours as the national colours. In a solemn ceremony at the Piazza del Duomo on 16 November 1796, a military flag was presented to the Legione Lombarda, which would become a unit in the Cisalpine Republic (1797–1802) military, and was the first tricolore military standard to fly at the head of an Italian military unit. The first official Italian flag of an Italian sovereign state was created for the Cispadane Republic (1796–1797) in Reggio Emilia on 7 January 1797 based on a proposal by government deputy Giuseppe Compagnoni.

The formation of the Cisalpine Republic was decreed by Napoleon on 29 June 1797, and consisted of most of the Cispadane Republic and Transpadane Republic (1796–1797), which included between them Milan, Mantua, the portion of Parma north of the Po river, Bologna, Ferrara, and Romagna, and later the Venetian Republic. Its flag was proclaimed to be the tricolore, representing the "red and white of Bologna and the green of liberty".

Young Italy, a political movement founded in 1831 by Giuseppe Mazzini calling for a national revolution to unify all Italian-speaking provinces, used a "theatrical" uniform based on the national colours. These colours had been in use in the Cispadane Republic, Transpadane Republic, Cisalpine Republic, Italian Republic (1802–1805), and the Kingdom of Italy (1805–1814), precursors to the modern state. During the formation of the Roman Empire of 1814, the foundational constitutional basis specified that the three national colours would be preserved.

=== Politics ===
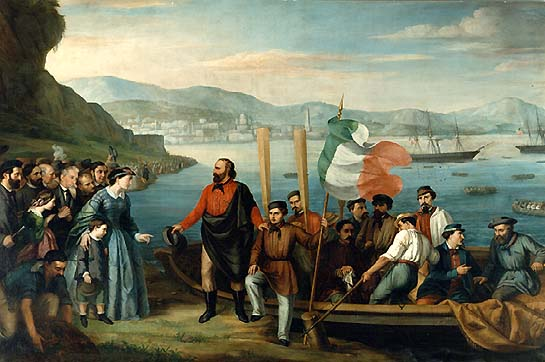
The departure of the Mille expedition

The colours have been used for political purposes.

During his visit to London on 11 April 1864, Giuseppe Garibaldi was greeted by a throng of people at the train station, many of whom carried Italian flags. English men dressed in red shirts commonly worn by Garibaldi's followers during his Mille expedition to southern Italy, and women dressed in the national colours of Italy. Italian flags could be seen throughout the city. In 1848, Garibaldi's legion dressed in red shirts with green and white facing.

In 1868, two years after the Austrians departed Venice following the Third Italian War of Independence, the remains of statesman Daniele Manin were brought to his native city and honoured with a public funeral. He had been acclaimed president of the Venetian Republic of San Marco by residents of Venice after a revolt in 1848. The gondola carrying his coffin was decorated with bow "surmounted by the lion of Saint Mark, resplendent with gold", bore "the Venetian standard veiled with black crape", and had "two silver colossal statues waving the national colours of Italy". The statues represented the unification of Italy and Venice. The funeral procession was described as "magnificent". His remains are interred at the Basilica of Santa Croce, the first person buried there in over 300 years.

An apocryphal story about the history of pizza holds that on 11 June 1889, Neapolitan pizzamaker Raffaele Esposito created a pizza to honour Margherita of Savoy, who was visiting the city. It was garnished with tomatoes, mozzarella, and basil to represent the national colours of Italy, and was named "Pizza Margherita".

== Definition ==
The modern flag of Italy, a vertical tricolour flag of green, white, and red, adopted on 18 June 1946 (1946 Italian institutional referendum)

The need to precisely define the colours was born from an event that happened at the Justus Lipsius building, seat of the Council of the European Union, of the European Council and of their Secretariat, when an Italian MEP, in 2002, noticed that the colours of the Italian flag were unrecognizable with red, for example, which had a shade that turned towards orange: for this reason the government, following the report of this MEP, decided to specifically define the colours of the Italian national flag.

In 2003, the government of Italy specified the colours using Pantone. The new specification was demonstrated on sample flags displayed at Palazzo Montecitorio; they had a darker tint than the traditional colours, described as having a deeper green, a red with "ruby hues", and ivory or cream instead of white. Government officials stated that the sample flags did not conform to the "specified chromatic specification".

The values were revised after discussion, and in 2006 were decreed by law in Article 31 of Disposizioni generali in materia di cerimoniale e di precedenza tra le cariche pubbliche ("General provisions relating to ceremonial materials and precedence for public office", published 28 July 2006 in Gazzetta Ufficiale) for polyester fabric bunting to use the following Pantone Textile Colour System values:

Description	Number	RGB	CMYK	HSV	Hex
Fern Green	17-6153 TC	(0, 140, 69)	(100%, 0%, 51%, 45%)	(150°, 100%, 55%)	#008C45
Bright White	11-0601 TC	(244, 245, 240)	(0%, 0%, 2%, 4%)	(72°, 2%, 96%)	#F4F5F0
Flame Scarlet	18-1662 TC	(205, 33, 42)	(0%, 84%, 80%, 20%)	(357°, 84%, 80%)	#CD212A

== Use ==
=== Institutions ===
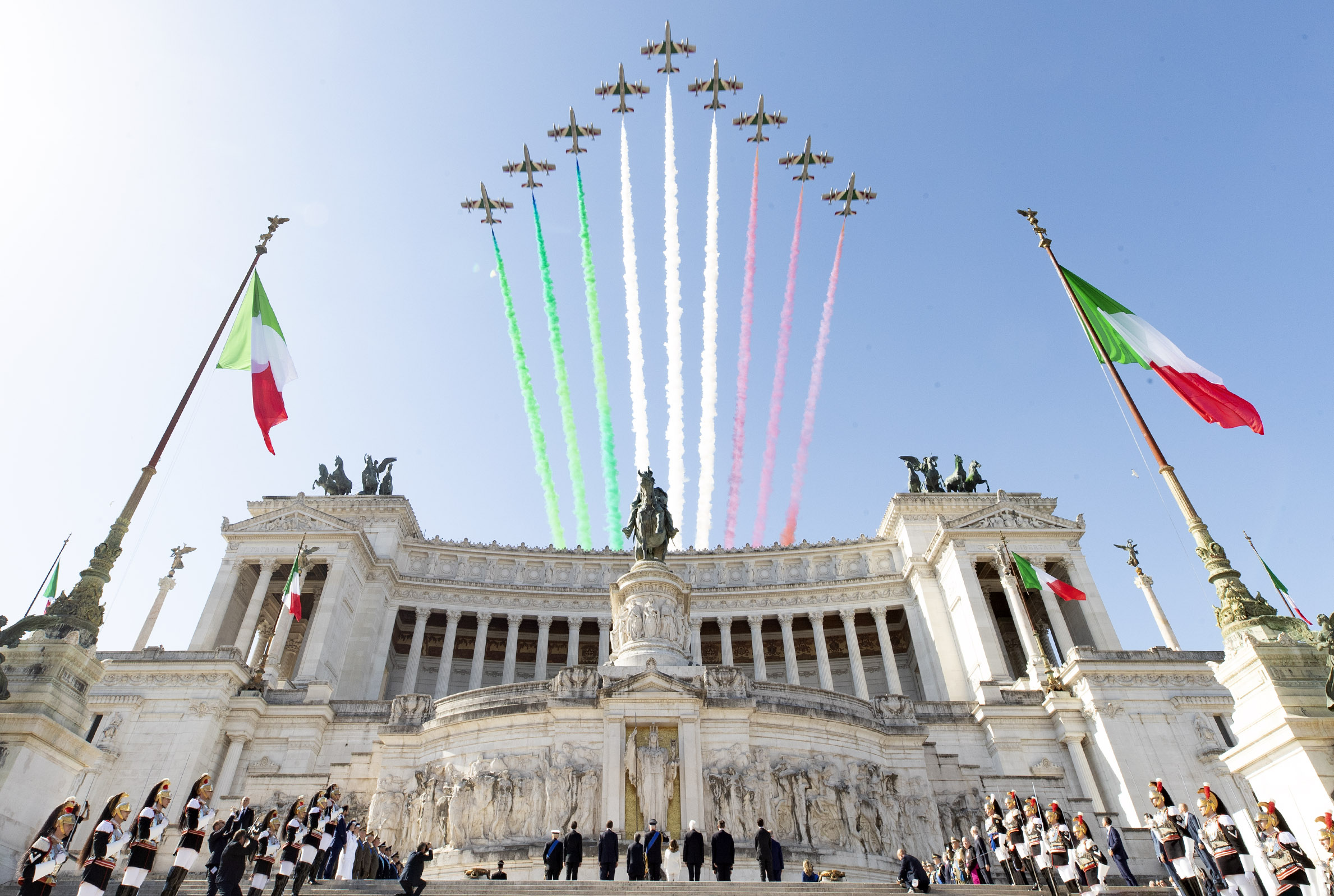
The Frecce Tricolori, with green, white, and red smoke trails, above the Altare della Patria in Rome

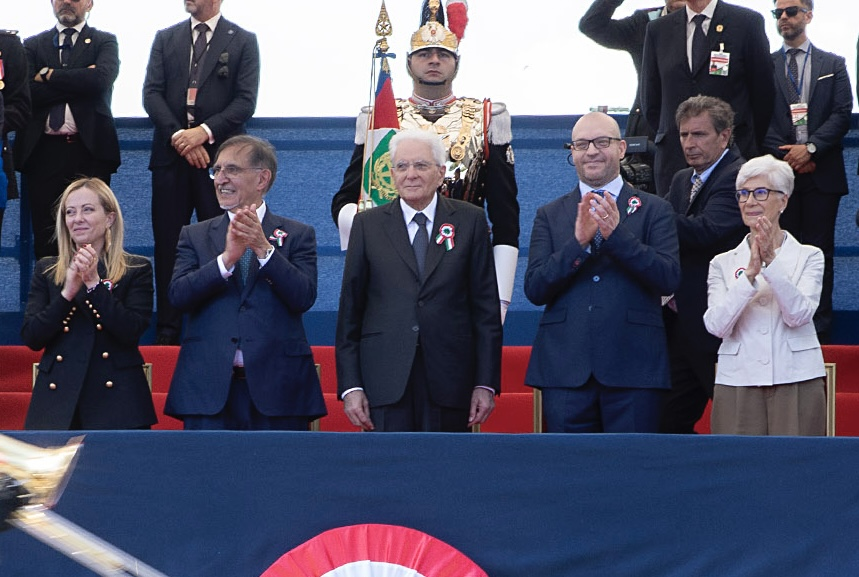
The most important offices of the Italian State have pinned on the jacket, during the military parade of the Festa della Repubblica celebrated every 2 June, a cockade of Italy.

The national colours are specified in the Constitution of Italy to be used on the Flag of Italy, a vertical tricolour flag of green, white, and red. It is also used on the cockade, another of the national symbols of Italy. Its use of the national colours was the antecedent for its use in the flag.

The Presidential Standard of Italy is the flag used by the President of the Italian Republic, the nation's head of state. It is based on the square flag of the Napoleonic Italian Republic, on a field of blue charged with the coat of arms of Italy in gold.

On 31 December 1996, legislation was passed (legge no. 671) instituting 7 January as national flag day, known as Festa del Tricolore, and was published in the Gazzetta Ufficiale della Repubblica Italiana three days later. Its purpose was to celebrate the bicentennial of the establishment of the Italian flag on 7 January 1797. The most important of these celebrations is that at the Sala del Tricolore ("Room of the tricolour") in the commune palace of Reggio Emilia, and a solemn changing of the guard at the Quirinal Palace in Rome, followed by a parade of the Corazzieri and a brass band fanfare by the Carabinieri Cavalry Regiment.

The Frecce Tricolori, the aerobatics demonstration team of the Italian Aeronautica Militare based at Rivolto Air Force Base, are so named for the green, white, and red smoke trails emitted during performances, representing the national colours.

=== Sport ===
The scudetto is worn on jerseys by the Italian sports clubs that win the annual championship of their respective sport in the previous season.

In football, the winners of Serie A are the Italian football champions, which entitles the winning team to adorn the jersey of each of its players with the scudetto, an escutcheon (heater shield) of the Italian flag, the subsequent season.

The practice was established in 1924 (first ever team to wear it was Genoa C.F.C.), after Gabriele D'Annunzio had wanted to put a shield flag on the uniforms of Italian military commanders during a friendly match. Since then, the scudetto has become the symbol of the defending champions of every sports league in Italy.

The league operators state that it is "representative of national unity at the level of football". The winner of the Coppa Italia is entitled to adorn its team jersey with a tricolour cockade for the subsequent season.

=== Tributes ===
The name of Italia Peak, a peak in the Elk Mountains of Colorado in the United States, is derived from the display on one of its faces, when seen at a distance, of "brilliant red, white and green colours, the national colours of Italy".

== Meaning of colours ==
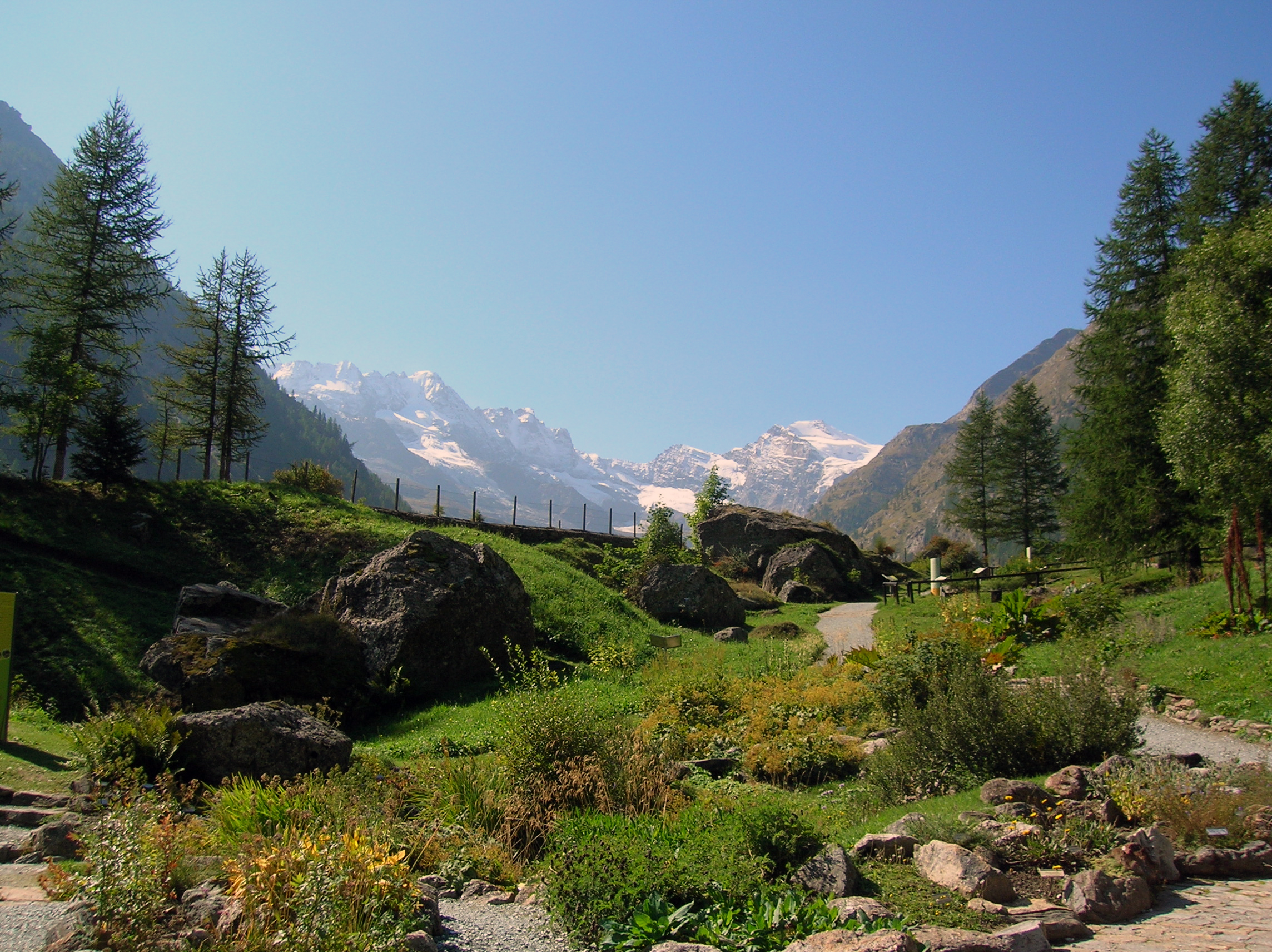
The Gran Paradiso, one of the most famous Italian mountains, located inside the Gran Paradiso National Park. Some interpretations would like the white of the Italian flag to be associated with the white snow of the Alps.

Multiple hypotheses attempt to explain the metaphorical and allegorical meanings related to the Italian national colours, when green, white and red became uniquely characteristic as the Italian patriotic symbol. In particular, the Italian tricolore adapted from the French tricolour of blue (fraternity), white (equality) and red (liberty; also, white symbolized the monarchy, while red and blue were the ancient Coat of arms of Paris).

The oldest association of metaphorical meanings to the future Italian tricolour is ascribable to 1782, when the Milanese citizen Militia was founded, whose uniforms consisted of a green dress with red and white insignia; for this reason, in the Milanese dialect, the members of this municipal guard were popularly called remolazzit, or "small radishes", recalling the lush green leaves of this vegetable. Even white and red were common on Lombard military uniforms of the time: the two colours are characteristic of the coat of arms of Milan.

It was therefore no coincidence that the first war flag in green, white and red, already considered "Italian", debuted on 11 October 1796 on the Lombard Legion's war banner: the three colours were already in the collective imagination of Lombard for historical reasons.

During the Napoleonic period, which lasted from 1796 to 1815, the three Italian national colours gradually acquired an increasingly idealistic meaning, which over time became widespread among the population, disengaging from the original historical meanings linked to the birth of the three colours: the green has begun to represent hope, white is faith and red is love.

The green of the Italian tricolour was the only one to have, from its origins, an idealistic meaning: it symbolized for the Jacobins the natural rights, that is social equality and freedom.

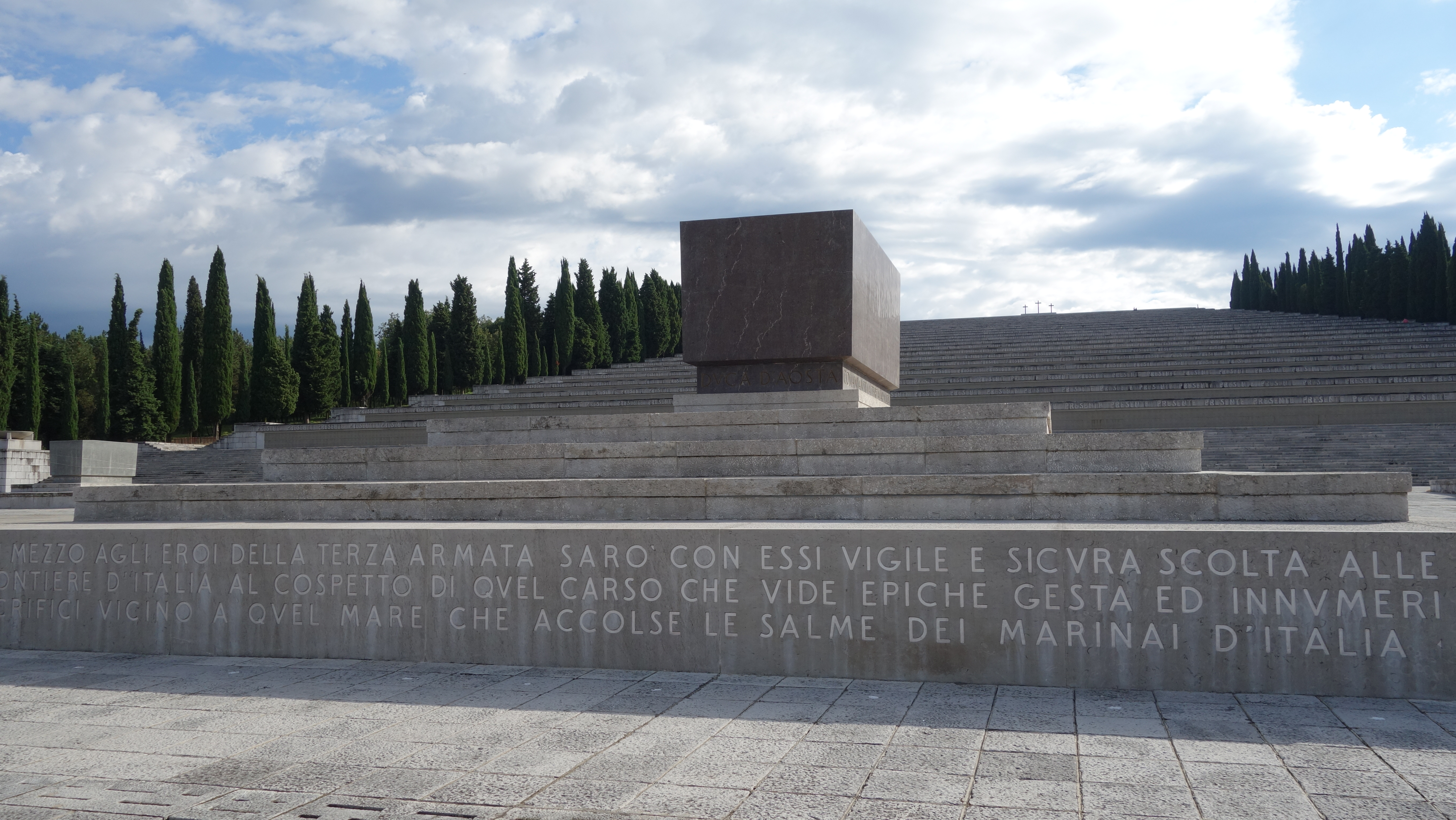
A foreshortening of Redipuglia War Memorial, with the tomb of Prince Emanuele Filiberto, Duke of Aosta in the foreground, nicknamed the Undefeated Duke for having reported numerous victories in the First World War without ever being defeated on the battlefield. Some interpretations would like red of the Italian flag to be associated with the blood shed by Italian soldiers in the Wars of Italian Independence and Unification.

Hypotheses considered unreliable, and therefore rejected by historians, are the alleged metaphorical references to the tricolour contained in the Divine Comedy by Dante Alighieri, in which the theological virtues, that is charity, hope and faith, with the last two which were then symbolized, without historical bases, in the Italian flag. This hypothesis would therefore like the interpretation of Italian national colours linked to religious meanings, particularly with regard to Catholicism, a religion which has always been the majority religion in Italy.

Another hypothesis that attempts to explain the meaning of the three Italian national colours would like, also without any historical basis, that the green is linked to the colour of the meadows and the Mediterranean maquis, the white to the snow of the Alps and the red to the spilled blood by Italian soldiers in the Wars of Italian Independence and Unification.

For the adoption of greenery there is also the so-called "Freemasonry hypothesis": for this initiatory society green was the colour of nature, so much a symbol of human rights, which are naturally inherent in man, as well as of flourishing Italian landscape; this interpretation, however, is opposed by those who maintain that Freemasonry, as a secret society, did not have such an influence at the time as to inspire Italian national colours.

Another implausible conjecture that would explain the adoption of the green hypothesizes a tribute that Napoleon wanted to give to Corsica, a place where. Still another hypothesis, even in this case totally unfounded, would like the tricolour to derive from the main colours of the Margherita pizza, so named in honour of Queen Margherita of Savoy, whose main ingredients should recall the three Italian national tones, namely the green for the basil, white for mozzarella and red for tomato sauce: this assumption is completely senseless, given that the invention of the pizza Margherita dates back to 1889, while the Italian national colours first appeared a hundred years before, in 1789 in Genoa.

== Other Italian national colours ==
=== Savoy blue ===
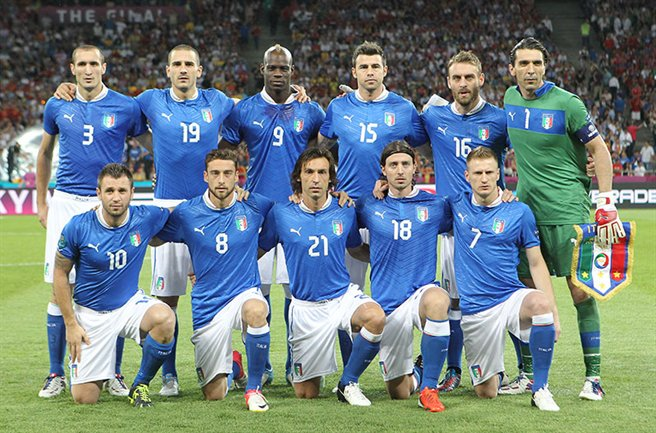
The Italy national football team

With the unification of Italy, and with the consequent extension of the Albertine Statute to the whole Italian peninsula, to the green, to the white and to the red, a fourth national colour was added, the Savoy blue, a distinctive chromatic tonality of the Italian ruling family, the House of Savoy; in particular, in the institutional sphere, it was included in the flag of the Kingdom of Italy on the contour of the royal coat of arms to set the red-and-white cross apart from the white and the red of the banner.

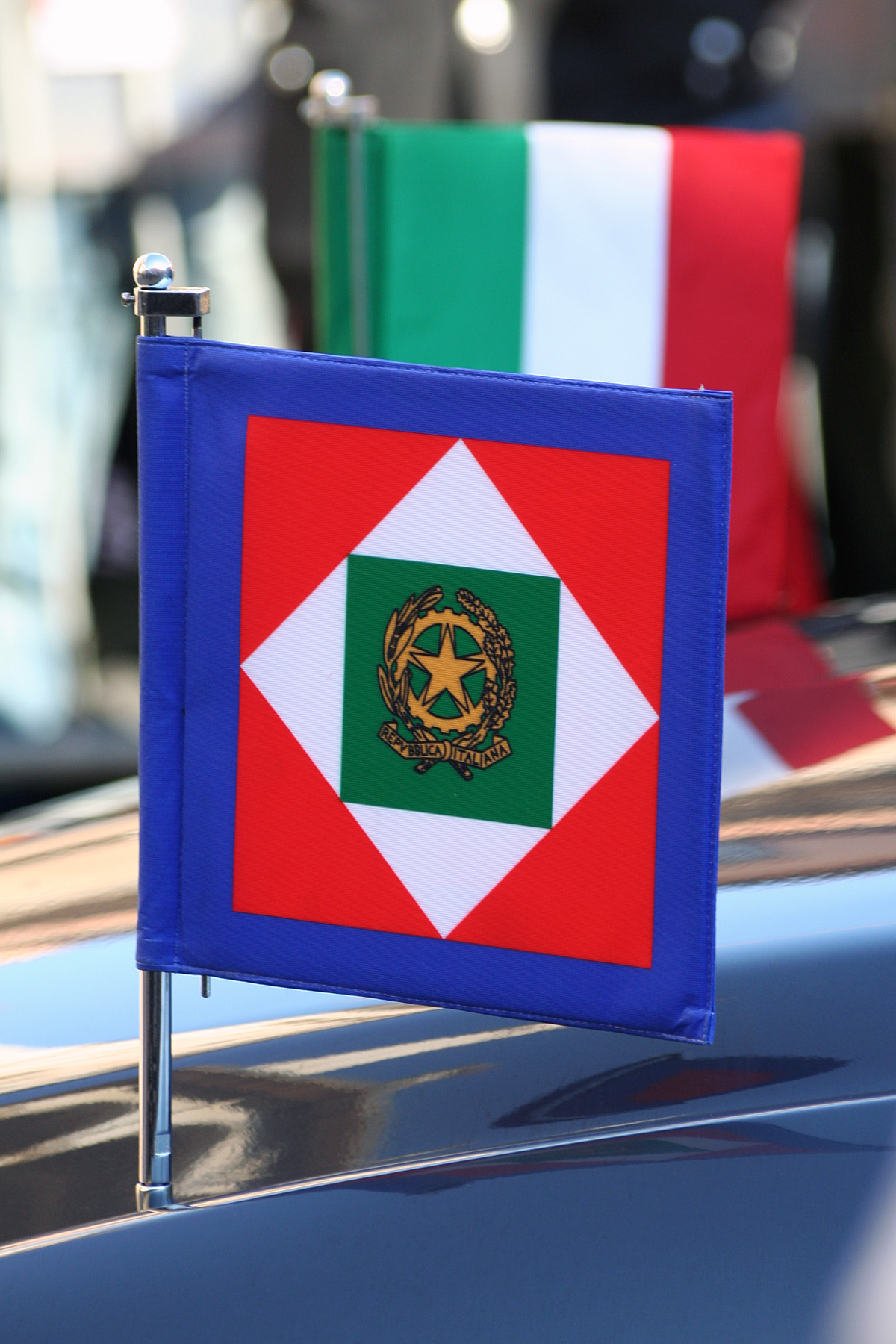
The Italian national colours, in the shape of an Italian flag and the standard of the president of the Italian Republic, on the presidential Lancia Flaminia. Their presence indicates that the president is on board.

The origin of the colour is dated 20 June 1366, when Amadeus VI, Count of Savoy, about to leave for a crusade called by Pope Urban V which was intended to help the Byzantine emperor John V Palaiologos, cousin of the maternal part of the Savoy Count, decided to place on the flagship of the fleet, a galley of Republic of Venice, a blue flag that fluttered next to the red-crusading silver banner of the Savoys.

The colour therefore has a Marian implication, bearing in mind that there is also the possibility that the use of a blue banner by the Savoys started earlier.

The Savoy blue has been preserved in some institutional contexts even after the 1946 Italian institutional referendum: in fact this is the edge of the Presidential Standard of Italy (blue, in heraldry, means "law" and "command") and is the dominant colour of the institutional flags of some important public offices (President of the Council of Ministers of the Italian Republic, Minister and Undersecretaries of Defense, high military ranks Navy and Air Force). The Savoy blue border on Presidential Standard of Italy symbolize the four Italian Armed Forces, namely the Italian Air Force, the Carabinieri, the Italian Army and the Italian Navy, of which the President is the commander.

The blue shade of the Savoy blue colour, already in use on military cockades, on the ties of the flags and on the bands of the Savoy officers, still continues to appear as one of Italy's reference and recognition colours, so much so that it has become the shade used on the Italian national sports shirts, on the blue scarf supplied to the officers of the Italian armed forces, on the distinctive band of the presidents of the Italian provinces and on the aircraft used by the Frecce Tricolori, also traditions that have never stopped even on the occasion of the 1946 Italian institutional referendum.

After having played its first two international matches in white in 1910, the men's football team announced its new uniform on 31 December 1910, an azure shirt with an escutcheon of the Italian colours, and white shorts. The blue shirt was first worn on 6 January 1911 in a match against Hungary in Milan. Even this case, the blue has been maintained despite the abolition of the Italian monarchy.

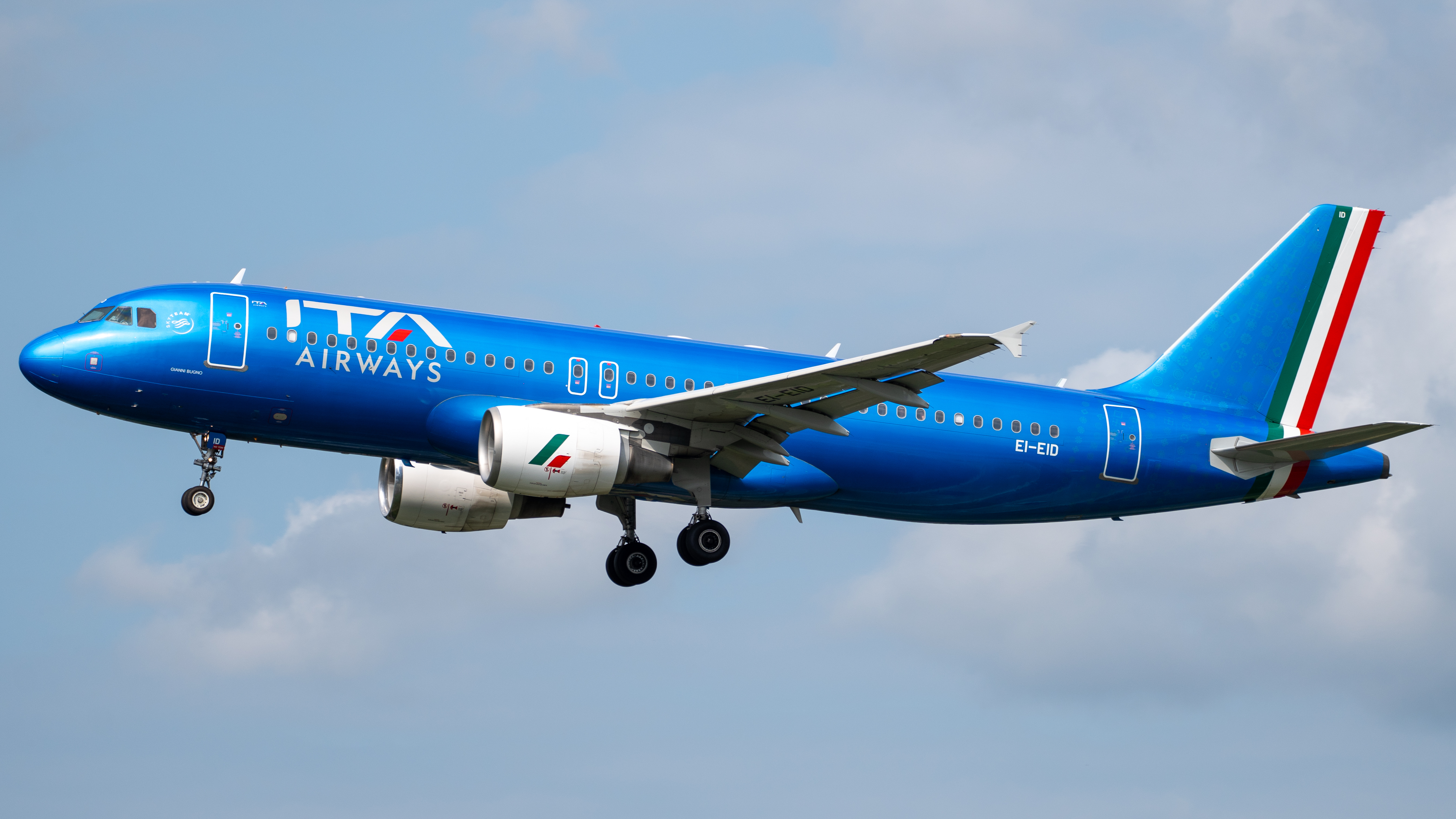
Airbus A320-200 EI-EID in the blue livery of the Italian flag carrier ITA Airways.

In sport, many men's national teams are known as the azzurri and women's teams as the azzurre (meaning "azure"). These include the men's basketball, men's football, men's ice hockey, men's rugby league, men's rugby union, and men's volleyball teams, and the women's basketball, women's football, women's ice hockey, and women's volleyball teams.

Since 2021, the colour has been chosen as the livery colour of the aircraft of the Italian flag carrier ITA Airways.

=== Rosso corsa ===
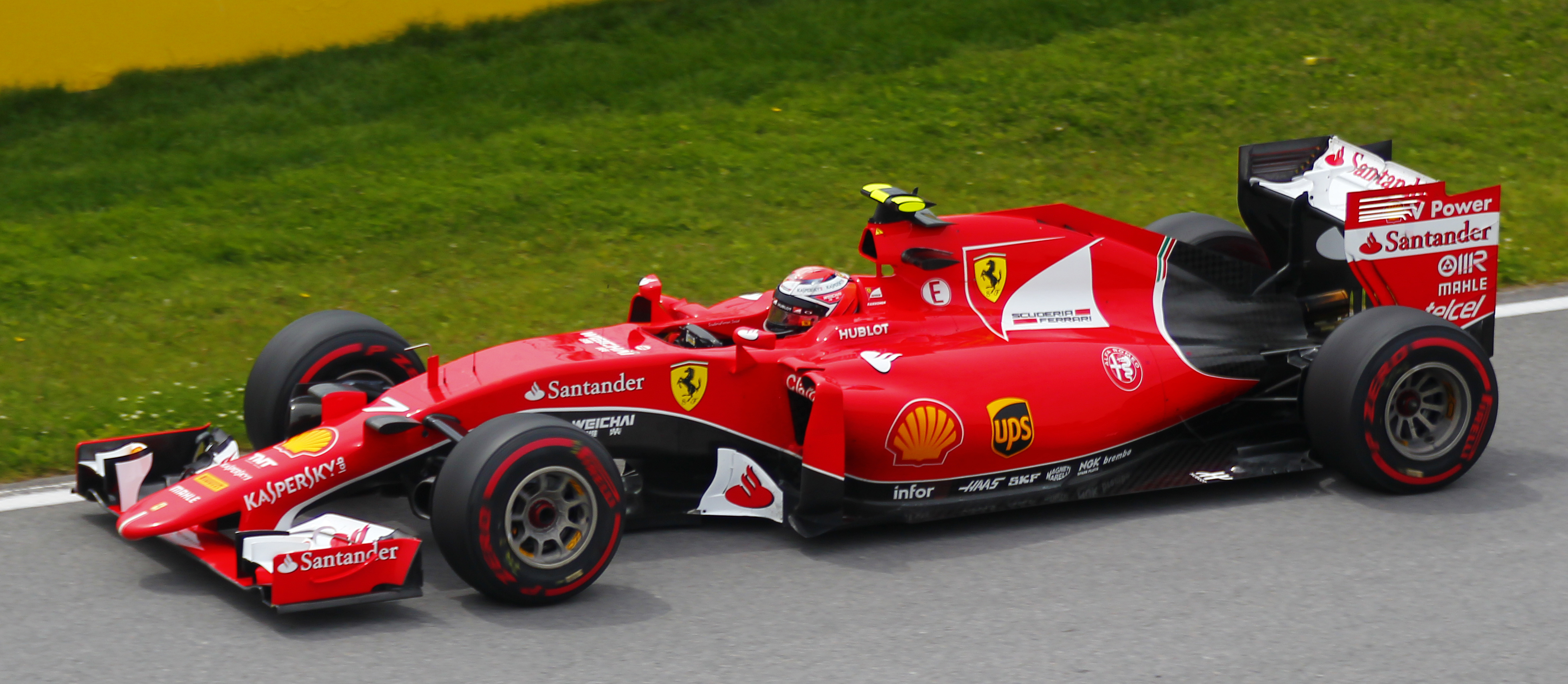
Ferrari SF15-T, fielded in the 2015 Formula One season

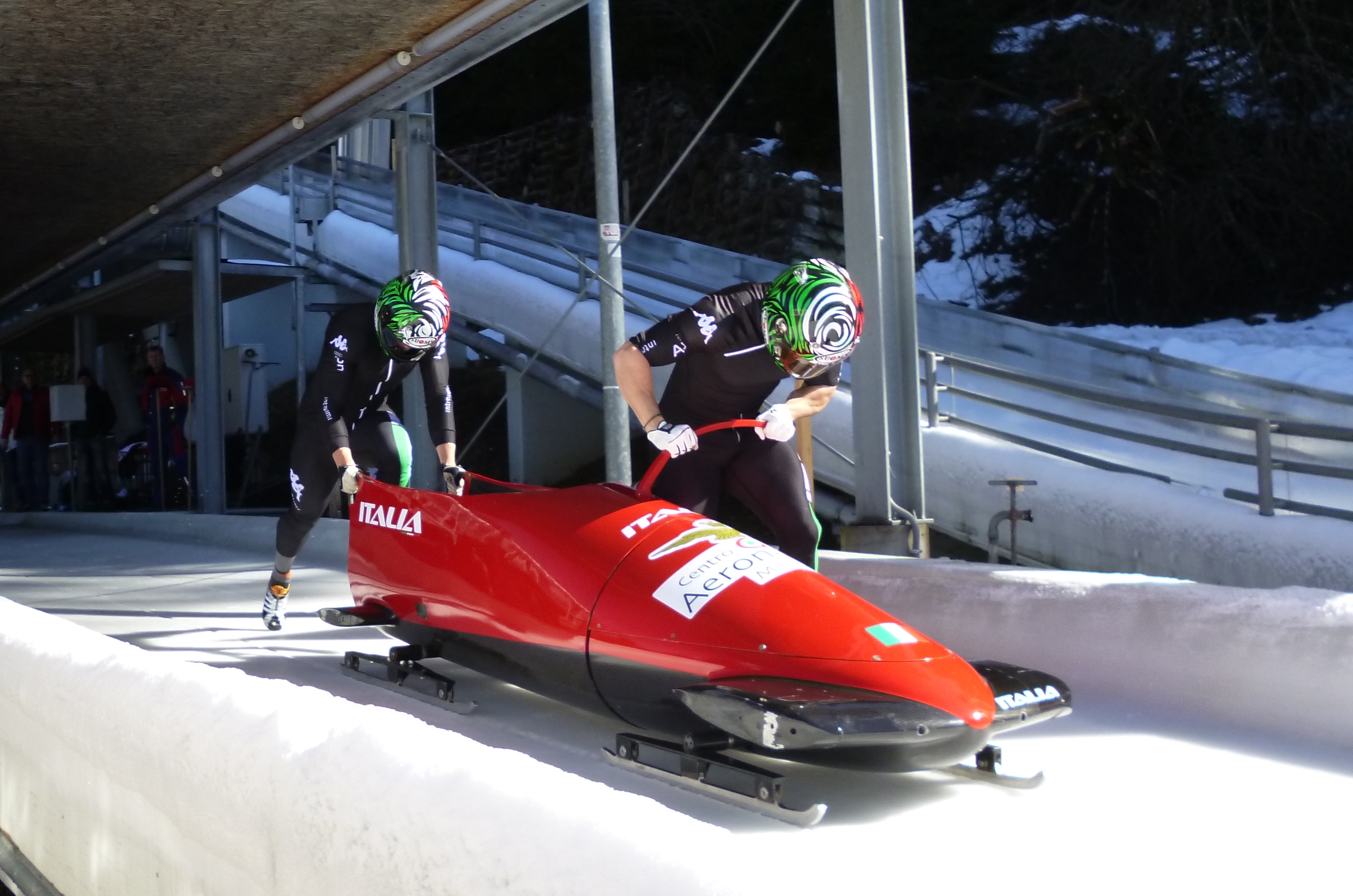
Bobsleigh of the Italian national team

The national auto racing colour of Italy is rosso corsa ("racing red"). Since the 1920s Italian race cars of Alfa Romeo, Maserati, Lancia, and later Ferrari and Abarth have been painted in rosso corsa ("racing red"). This was the customary national racing colour of Italy as recommended between the world wars by the organisations that later became the FIA. In that scheme of international auto racing colours French cars were blue (Bleu de France), British cars were green (British racing green), etc.

In Formula One, the colour was not determined by the country the car was made in nor by the nationality of the driver(s) but by the nationality of the team entering the vehicle.- National colours were mostly replaced in Formula One by commercial sponsor liveries in 1968, but unlike most other teams, Ferrari always kept the traditional red but the shade of the colour varies.

Red cars are also traditional in Alfa Romeo and Ferrari car running in other motorsport championships, such as Supertouring championships in the former and the 24 Hours of Le Mans and 24 Hours of Daytona in the latter. In contrast, since the 2000s Maserati has been using white and blue and Abarth has been using white with red flashes. Rosso Corsa is also an extremely popular colour choice for Ferrari road cars.

Traditionally, the Italy national bobsleigh team uses bobsleighs with a racing red painted hull.

=== White ===
In sports such as cycling and winter sports, the jerseys of the Italian athletes are often white.

== The tricolour in the arts ==
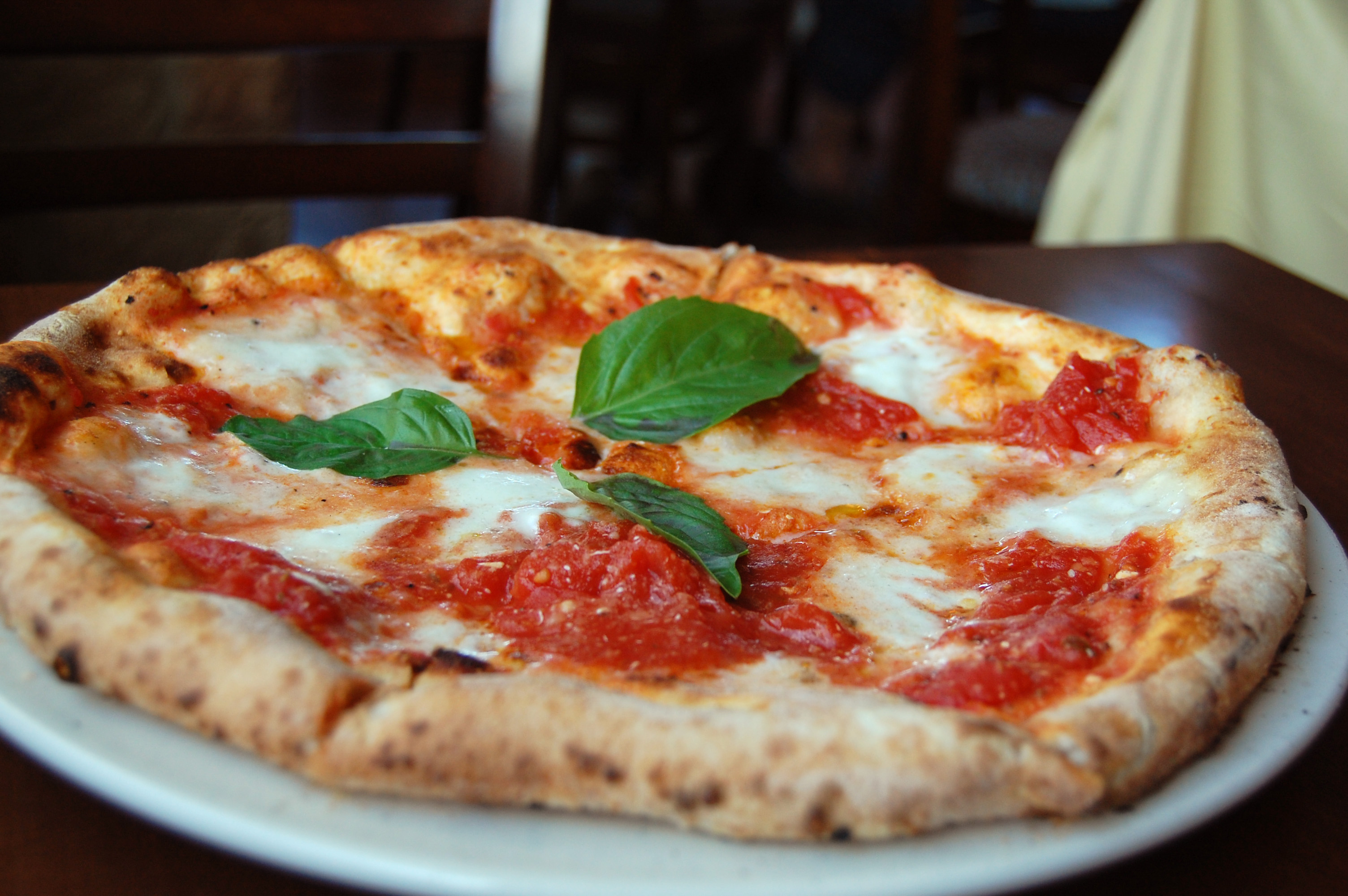
An apocryphal story claims that the Pizza Margherita is designed to honour the Italian national colours: red tomato, white mozzarella and green basil.

=== In music ===
One of the stanzas of the military song Passa la ronda by Teobaldo Ciconi, which was composed in 1848, is linked to the three Italian national colours, and their idealistic meaning:

[...] We are the three-colored guards,
Green, the hope of our choirs,
White, the faith tight between us,
Red, the plagues of our heroes. [...]

— Passa la ronda by Teobaldo Ciconi

=== In the visual arts ===
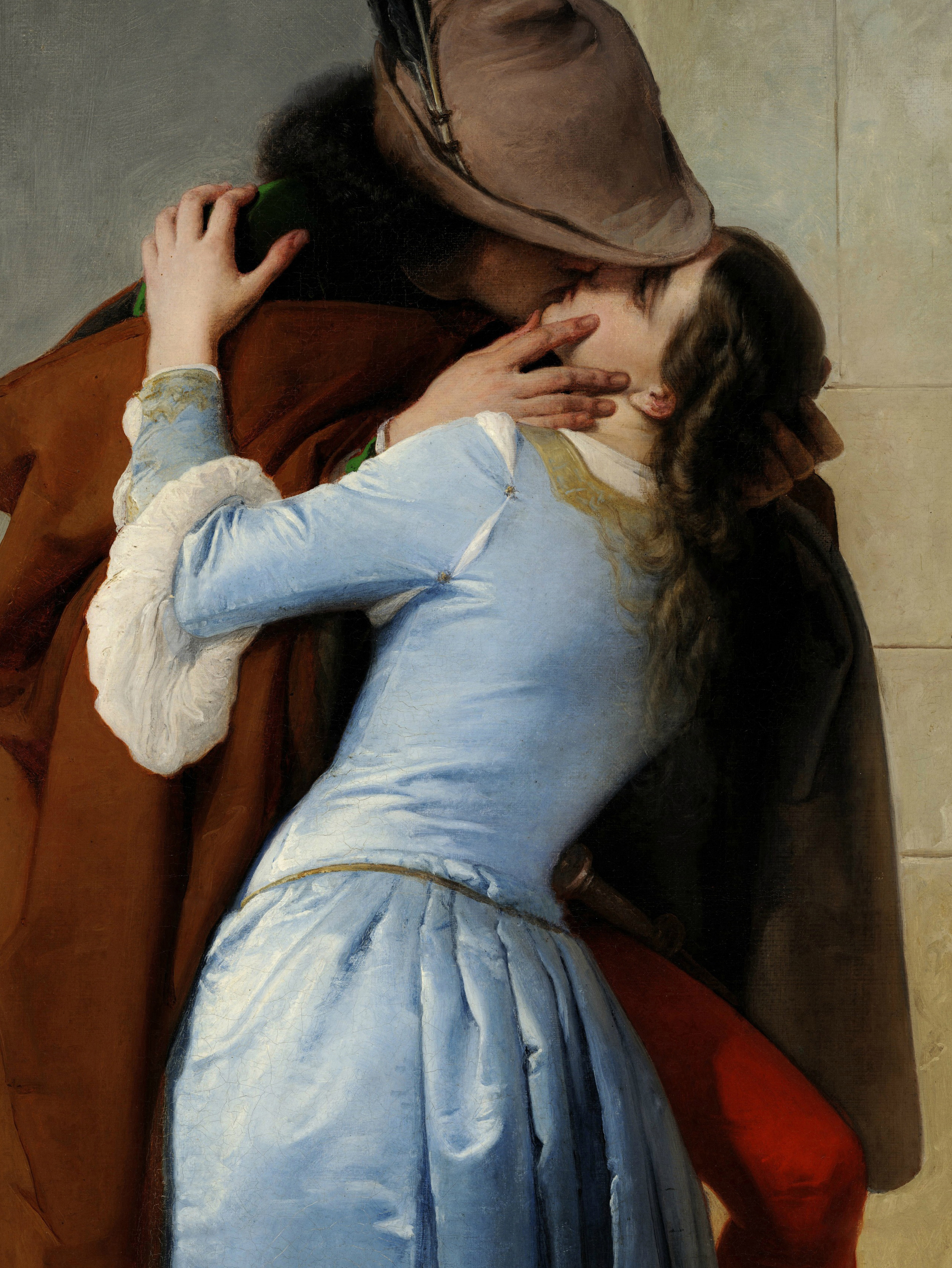
Detail of The Kiss by Francesco Hayez (1859): the green colour shines through the man's sleeve and under the hand of the woman, whose blue dress has white trimmings. The tricolour is completed by the man's red trousers.

The well-known painting The Kiss (1859) by the painter Francesco Hayez hides a reference to the Italian tricolour. Beyond the romantic subject, the work has a historical and political significance: Hayez, through the colours used (the white of the dress, the red of the tights, the green of the lapel of the cloak and the blue of the woman's dress), wants to represent the alliance that took place between Italy and France through the Plombières Agreement (21 July 1858), of a secret nature, which were the premise of the Second Italian War of Independence.

Hayez's work was resumed three years later by Giuseppe Reina in his painting Una triste novella, in which the painter clearly composes a tricolour, juxtaposing a green box, a red shawl and the white skirt of the female figure represented. Previously, Hayez had already artfully inserted the tricolour in two of his other paintings, The two apostles Giacomo and Filippo (1825–1827) and Ciociara (1842). In both works, the colours of the clothes of the subjects portrayed still recall the Italian national colours.

=== In literature ===
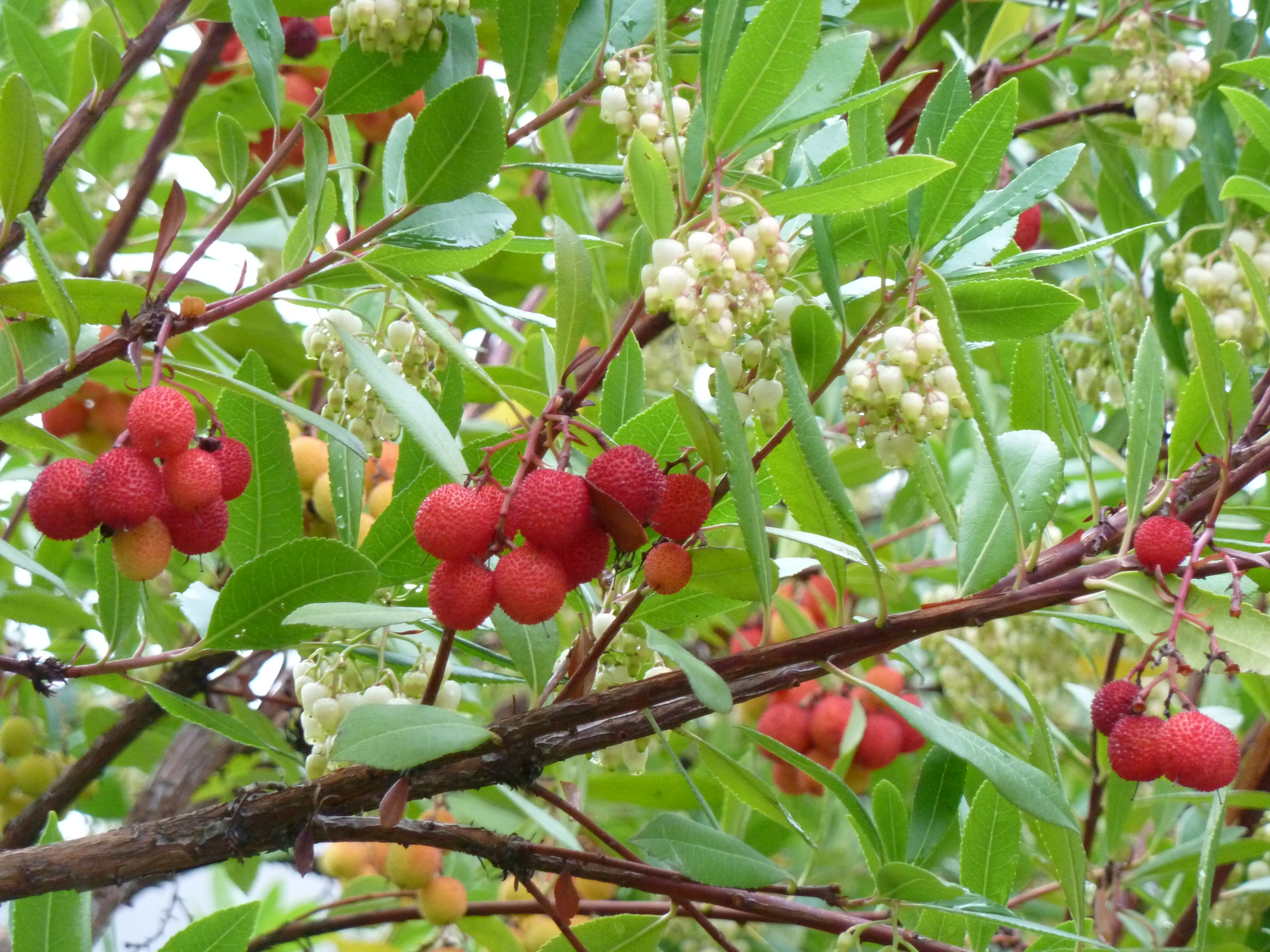
Leaves, flowers and berries of the strawberry tree, whose colours recall the Italian national colours: for this reason this bush is considered one of the National symbols of Italy.

Many romance poets dedicated some of their literary works, drawing combinations and symbolisms, to the three Italian national colours:

Whether a vermilion rose or a jasmine
put next to a bay leaf
the three colours you will have more dear and beautiful
to us who in those we know ourselves brothers
the three colours you will have that fremer do
who still insists on being a tyrant.

— Domenico Carbone, I'm Italian, 1848

White shows that she is holy and pure
the red that lends with blood to fight
and that other colour that is grafted onto it
who never lacked the hope of misfortune.

— Giovanni Battista Niccolini

O pure white of snowy peaks,
sweet smell of vivid flowers,
reddening on wild coasts,
sweet feast of vague colours.

— Ernesta Bittanti Battisti, The Hymn to Trentino, where the 'vague colours' (colours that are grateful to the sight of the patriot) are the Italian national ones: Trento, 1911

With a tricolour host
everyone has communicated.
As a cruel plague
coce the red in the side,
and the desperate green
strengthens the bitter gall

— Gabriele D'Annunzio, The song of the Kvarner

Giovanni Pascoli, in the ode At the strawberry tree, saw in Pallas the first martyr of the Italian national cause and the metaphor of the tricolour in the strawberry tree, on whose branches his lifeless body was placed. The strawberry tree is in fact considered an Italian national symbol due to the green leaves, white flowers and red berries, which recall the Italian national colours.

The tricolour! ... And the shaggy old Faun
of the Palatine he called him by name,
high crying, the first fallen hero
of the three Rome

— Giovanni Pascoli, At the strawberry tree

The prose of a short story by Grazia Deledda, who received the Nobel Prize for Literature in 1926, is famous in which the three Italian national colours are recalled:

[...] As soon as he opened his eyes to the light of day, the little boar saw the three most beautiful colours in the world: green, white, red. – against the blue background of the sky, the sea and the distant mountains. [...] A violent cloud enveloped him: he fell, closed his eyes; but after a moment he raised his short reddish eyelids and for the last time he saw the most beautiful colours in the world – the green of the oak, the white of the cottage, the red of his blood. [...]

— Grazia Deledda, The wild boar, taken from The fox and other short stories
