= Data discourse =

A data discourse is a discourse that works within the context of data and how data can fulfill particular purposes, agendas and narratives. In relation to open data, the discourses about sharing, reuse, open access, open government, transparency, accountability, social entrepreneurship, and economies of scale are organized to form a discursive regime that promotes investment in open data. In relation to big data, the discourses of insight, wisdom, productivity, competitiveness, efficiency, effectiveness, utility, value is deployed to promote their legitimization and usage in businesses and repositories.

== Examples ==
Patrick Ferucci evaluates meta journalistic discourse in relation to big data through analyzing Metra journalism from 2000 to 2017.

At Online Marketing Summit, in San Diego, Cheemin Bo-Linn, president and interim CMO at Peritus Partners, discusses the increase of big data such as, Facebook that produces 10 terabytes of data per day. Cheemin Bo-Linn says marketers can use these big data to examine practices and behavior of customers, plan campaigns to take actions, to target consumers and shape consumers' habits.

Big data is used to analyze and understand environmental discourses in hotel online reviews.

== Narratives ==
Data imaginaries and discourses are brought together to compose what Foucault coined a term 'discursive regime'. Discursive regime is a coordination of overlapping arguments that promotes developments and legalizes the actions of the developments. The goal of discourses within a regime is to make messages and narratives appear logical, to convince people and institution to act according to the logics and norms of the regime. Data imaginaries and affordances are attained through agglomeration of several data discourses.

The discourses and imaginaries are linked together to form data narratives to make stories about data and their interconnected assemblages persuasive. Data do not represent themselves. For data to be represented and narrated, it is placed in specific settings in order to create shape and meaning making. The elements of data narratives are data trajectories, data temporalities, the cultural grounding of data narratives.
