= L'Imagination symbolique =

1964 book by French anthropologist Gilbert Durand

L'Imagination symbolique ('The Symbolic Imagination') is a philosophical anthropology book from French anthropologist Gilbert Durand. The first edition was issued in 1964. Durand reprises his influential concept of the anthropological trajectory, and he proposed a "tactical pedagody of the imaginary."

Some passages from the essay are revisited version of Dudans's 1954 publication in SUP.: Initiation philosophique. Among the differences, the change in terminology from "cultures apolliniennes" to "régime diurne," and from "cultures dionysiennes" to "régime nocturne"; the earlier terminology followed that of Ruth Benedict and Nietzsche, while the new terminology follows what Durand formulated in 1960 with The Anthropological Structures of the Imaginary.

== Editions and translations ==
- 1970 象徴の想像力 / Shōchō no sōzōryoku, translated by Akira Unami
- 1971 La imaginación simbólica, published by Amorrortu Editores
- 1999 L'immaginazione simbolica, translated by Anna Chiara Peduzzi
- 1988 A imaginação simbólica
- 1998 Sembolik imgelem, Translated by Ayşe MERAL

== See also ==
- Collective unconscious
- Ernst Cassirer (1944) An essay on man
- Imaginary (sociology)
