= Gilbert Durand =

French academic (1921–2012)

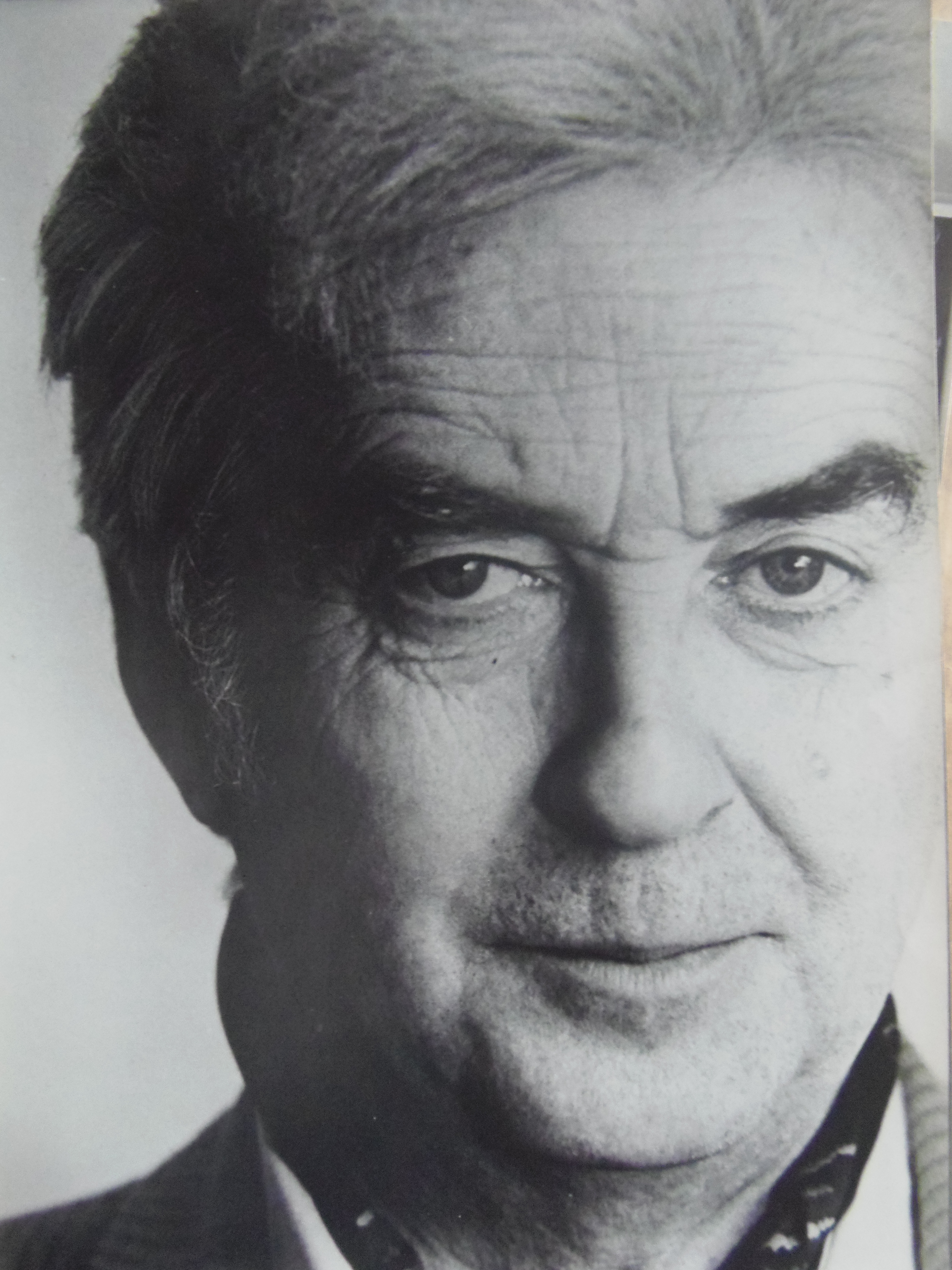
- Gilbert Durand
- Born: 1 May 1921; Chambéry, France
- Died: 7 December 2012 (aged 91); Moye, France

Philosophical work
- Era: 20th-century philosophy
- Region: Western philosophy
- Institutions: Grenoble-II
- Main interests: Anthropology, symbology, depth psychology, history of religion

Gilbert Durand (French: [dyʁɑ̃]; 1 May 1921 – 7 December 2012) was a French academic known for his work on the imaginary, symbolic anthropology and mythology.

According to Durand, Imagination and Reason can be complementary. He defended the status of the image, traditionally devalued in Western thought, particularly in French philosophy. He advocated a multidisciplinary approach.

He distinguished between two regimes: the diurnal and the nocturnal, to classify symbols and archetypes.

== Biography ==
During World War Two he joined the French Resistance in the Vercors.

He began his career by teaching philosophy in the secondary school system from 1947 to 1956 (philosophy is taught in France at high school level), and then became a university professor of sociology and anthropology at the Grenoble II.

Gilbert Durand was the co-founder – with Léon Cellier and Paul Deschamps in 1966 – and the director, of the Centre de recherche sur l'imaginaire and a member of Eranos. In 1988 he founded the humanities and social sciences review Les Cahiers de L'imaginaire.

He was a follower of Gaston Bachelard, Henry Corbin and Carl Gustav Jung and the teacher of Michel Maffesoli. Gilbert Durand gained a worldwide notoriety and his Center is currently the small group of an international network of over sixty laboratories. In his most famous work, Les Structures anthropologiques de l'imaginaire (1960), he formulated the influential concept of the anthropological trajectory (sometimes translated anthropological dialectic or anthropological course), according to which there is a bijective influence between physiology and society.

In 1984, Gilbert Durand supervised the thesis by Michel Gaucher on L'Intuition astrologique dans l'imaginaire (Université Grenoble-II).

In 1991 a special colloquium organized by Michel Maffesoli was held in his honour at the prestigious Centre culturel international de Cerisy-la-Salle.

On 14 March 2007, in Chambéry, Durand was raised to the title of Commander of the Légion d'honneur, which was bestowed on him by a personality of his choice, in this case Raymond Aubrac on behalf of the President (as is customary).

Durand died on 7 December 2012.

== Bibliography ==
- Les Structures anthropologiques de l'imaginaire, Paris, Dunod (first edition, Paris, P.U.F., 1960).
- Le Décor mythique de la Chartreuse de Parme, Paris, José Corti (1961)
- L'Imagination symbolique, Paris, PUF (first édition in 1964).
- Sciences de l'homme et tradition. Le nouvel esprit anthropologique, Paris, Albin Michel (first ed. Tête de feuille-Sirac, Paris, 1975).
- Figures mythiques et visages de l'œuvre. De la mythocritique à la mythanalyse, Paris, Berg International, 1979.
- L'Âme tigrée, Paris, Denoël, 1980.
- La Foi du cordonnier, Paris, Denoël, 1984.
- Beaux-arts et archétypes. La religion de l'art, Paris, P.U.F., 1989.
- L'Imaginaire. Essai sur les sciences et la philosophie de l'image, Paris, Hatier, 1994.
- Introduction à la mythodologie. Mythes et sociétés, Paris, Albin Michel, 1996.
- Champs de l'imaginaire. Textes réunis par Danièle Chauvin, Grenoble, Ellug, 1996.
- Les Mythes fondateurs de la franc-maçonnerie, Paris, Dervy, 2002.
- With Simone Vierne, Le Mythe et le Mythique, Paris, Albin Michel, 1987.
- With Sun Chaoying, Mythes, thèmes et variations, Paris, Desclée de Brouwer, 2000.
- Imagens e Reflexos do Imaginário Português, Lisbon, Hugin Editores, 2000. New Ed. with the addition of his correspondence with Lima de Freitas, under the title: Portugal - Tesouro Oculto da Europa, Lisbon, Ésquilo, 2008.
