= Frecce Tricolori =

Aerobatic demonstration team of the Italian Air Force

Coordinates: 45°58′42″N 13°03′05″E

- Frecce Tricolori insignia
- Active: 1 March 1961 – present
- Country: Italy
- Branch: Aeronautica Militare
- Role: Aerobatic display team
- Garrison/HQ: Rivolto Air Force Base, Codroipo, Udine, Italy
- Colors: National colours of Italy

Aircraft flown
- Fighter: 1961–63 Canadair F-86E; 1964–81 Fiat G.91 PAN
- Trainer: 1982–present Aermacchi MB-339-A/PAN; TBD Aermacchi M-346

The Frecce Tricolori (Italian: [ˈfrettʃe trikoˈloːri]; lit. 'Tricolour Arrows'), officially known as the 313° Gruppo Addestramento Acrobatico, Pattuglia Acrobatica Nazionale (PAN) Frecce Tricolori (lit. '313th Aerobatic Training Group, National Aerobatic Patrol (NAP) Tricolour Arrows'), is the aerobatic demonstration team of the Italian Air Force. Based at Rivolto Air Base, province of Udine, it was created on 1 March 1961 as a permanent group for the training of Air Force pilots in air acrobatics.

The Tricolour Arrows replaced unofficial teams that had been sponsored by various commands starting in the early 1930s. The team flies the Aermacchi MB-339-A/PAN, a two-seat fighter-trainer craft capable of 898 km/h at sea level. With ten aircraft, nine in close formation and a soloist, they are the world's largest acrobatics patrol, and their flight schedule, comprising about twenty acrobatics and about half an hour, makes them among the most famous in the world. It is one of national symbols of Italy. On 28 August 1988 three Frecce Tricolori aircraft collided during the Ramstein air show: it was one of the worst air show disasters in history, in which 67 spectators and three pilots died and 346 spectators sustained serious injuries.

== History ==
=== Previous display teams ===
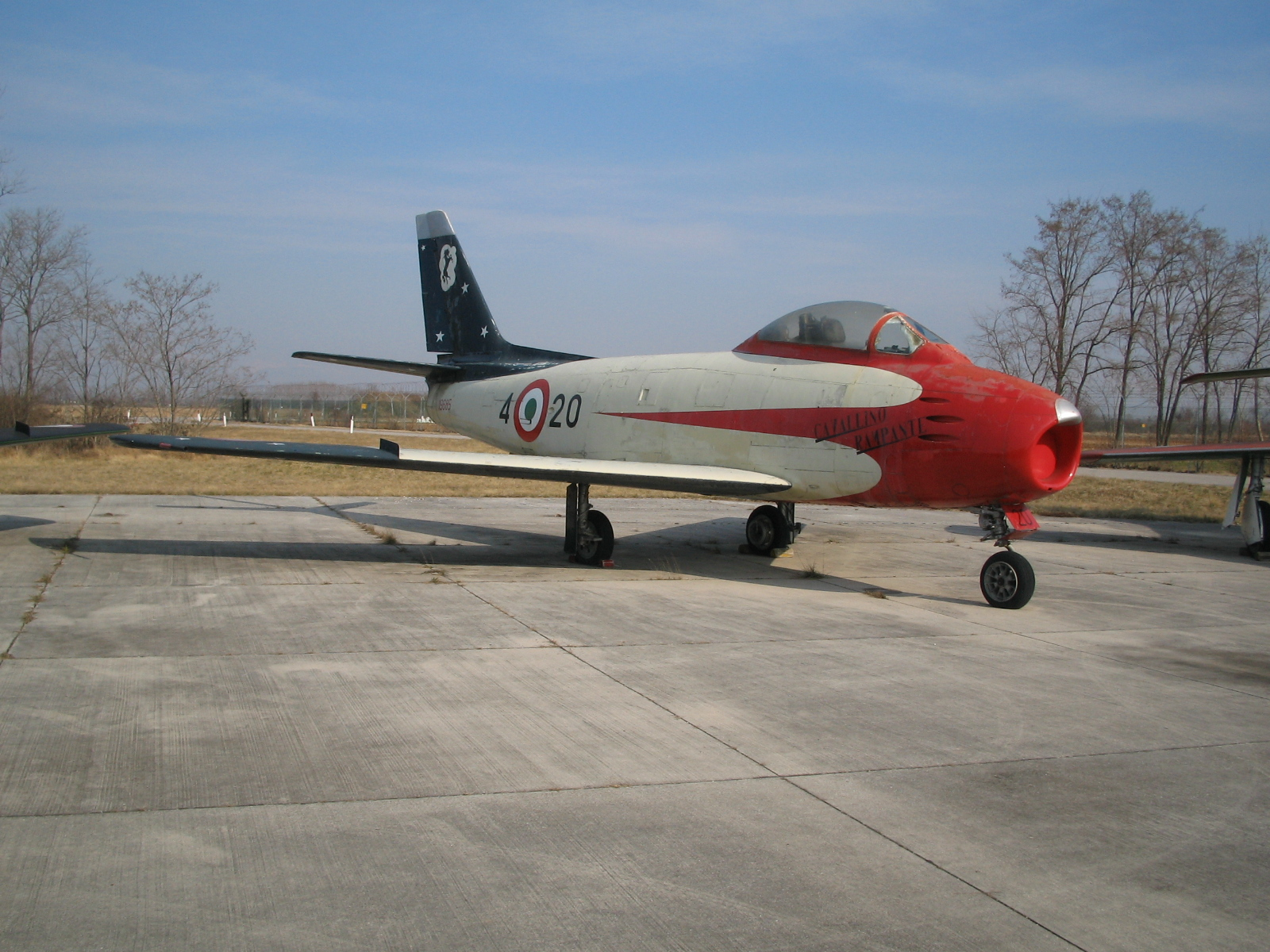
F-86E supplied with the Cavallino Rampante

In Italy the first acrobatic flight school was founded in 1930 at the Udine-Campoformido Airport on the initiative of Colonel Rino Corso Fougier, commander of the 1st Fighter Wing: the first formation consisted of five Fiat C.R.20 and already on 8 June 1930 at first air show, called "Wing Day", these planes performed in a "bomb", a figure similar to the current bomb.

In the years before the World War II the patrol of the Regia Aeronautica participated in various events (to note is that in 1932 Breda Ba.19 was used, in 1934 Fiat CR.30 and from 1936 Fiat CR.32), among which in 1938 the inauguration of the Milan-Linate Airport during which the Chief Patrol was Bruno Sartori, Silver Medal of Military Valor.

After the inevitable parenthesis of the 1939-1945 period the acrobatic patrol was dissolved and reformed after the war, even if not officially classified as an acrobatic patrol. It was in fact the 51st Fighter Wing, equipped with US P-51D Mustang and British Spitfire Mk.IX aircraft, the first to perform with three Spitfires at Padua Airport in September 1947. The enthusiasm of these pilots was soon followed by some of their colleagues of the 5th Wing, which formed another aerobatic team based on Spitfire aircraft.

In 1950 a patrol called Cavallino Rampante (Prancing Horse) formed, consisting of four pilots of the 4th Wing equipped with D.H.100 Vampire aircraft. In parallel with this department, in 1953 the Guizzo (Wriggle) was established, coming from the 5th Wing and operating on F-84G Thunderjet aircraft. This unit participated by gaining considerable success at various shows throughout Europe, thanks also to the return of the acrobatic manoeuvre called "bomb": the four pilots at the top of a looping in formation swooped down in opposite directions, calling the plane only near the ground. The notoriety of Guizzo grew to such an extent that in 1955 he was given a film called The four of the thundering jet (in honour of the Thunderjet), and it was thanks to this film that the department officially changed its name to Getti Tonanti (Thundering Jets), continuing to perform until 1956, when they were replaced by the Tigri Bianche (White Tigers) of the 51st Fighter Wing, always mounted on F-84G.

After a successful year, this new acrobatic team gave way to the reborn Cavallino Rampante and its new F-86E Saber, which will begin operations on May 19, 1957 at the Turin Airport, reaching its peak with the exhibition at the international exhibition of aeronautics and space in Paris Air Show. Many artistic victories also derived from the fact that, for the first time in Italy, a white smoke generator was used, with which the acrobatic figures were particularly highlighted. 1957 also saw the entry into the scene of two new acrobatic departments: the Diavoli Rossi (Red Devils) and the Lanceri Neri (Black Lancers). The former were on staff at the 6th Fighter Wing, and with their F-84F Thunderstreak they achieved a great consensus among the population, as shown by their tour in the United States of America; the latter instead came from the 2nd Aerobrigata, demonstrating, with the help of the F-86E, great operational ability, which led them to fly also in Iran in 1959 in the presence of the Shah Mohammad Reza Pahlavi.

In 1959 the Getti Tonanti line-up equipped with F-84F was also reconstituted, whose livery will be modified in 1960 with the five circles of the Olympic flag on the occasion of the 1960 Summer Olympics held in Rome.

=== Birth of the Frecce Tricolori ===
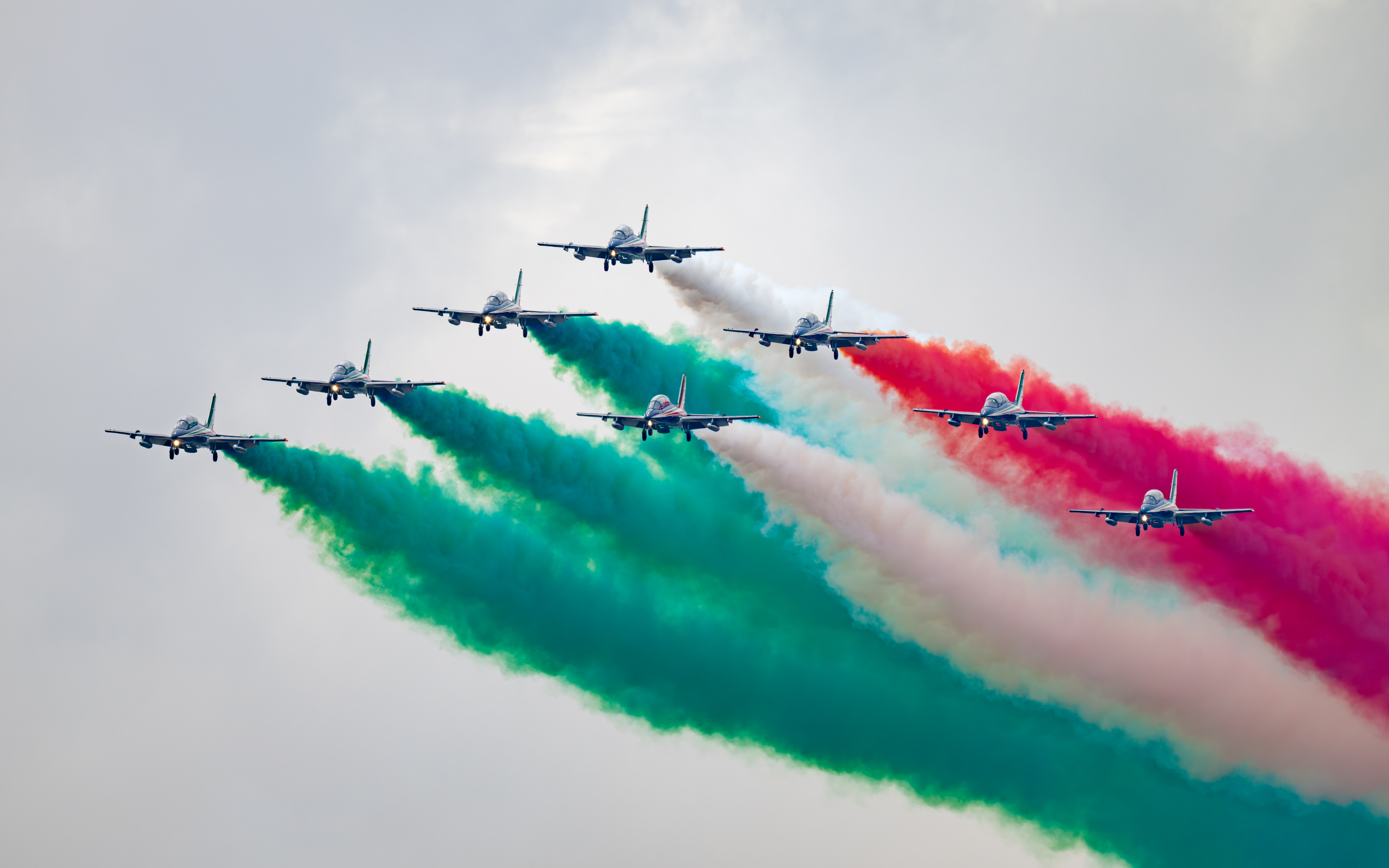
The Frecce Tricolori, with the smoke trails representing the national colours of Italy.

Towards the end of 1960, it was decided to end this shifting between the various flocks and to found a department whose specific purpose was to form the national aerobatic team, selecting the best pilots of the various departments.

Major Mario Squarcina, leader of the Diavoli Rossi was thus commissioned by the General Staff of the Italian Air Force to establish the Pattuglia Acrobatica Nazionale (National Aerobatic Patrol) composed of pilots from all the Air Force departments. The 313th Aerobatic Training Group was founded on 1 March 1961 at the Rivolto Air Base. On the same day, 6 North American F-86 Sabers of the 4th Air Brigade took off from Grosseto to Rivolto. On 1 May 1961 the first official release of the Pattuglia Acrobatica Nazionale (P.A.N.) with the high program of 4 + 1 F86 Saber on the airport of Trento - Gardolo, on the occasion of the Air Show of the local Aero Club. Three days later, on May 3, there was an incident in a flight, during which a pilot died.

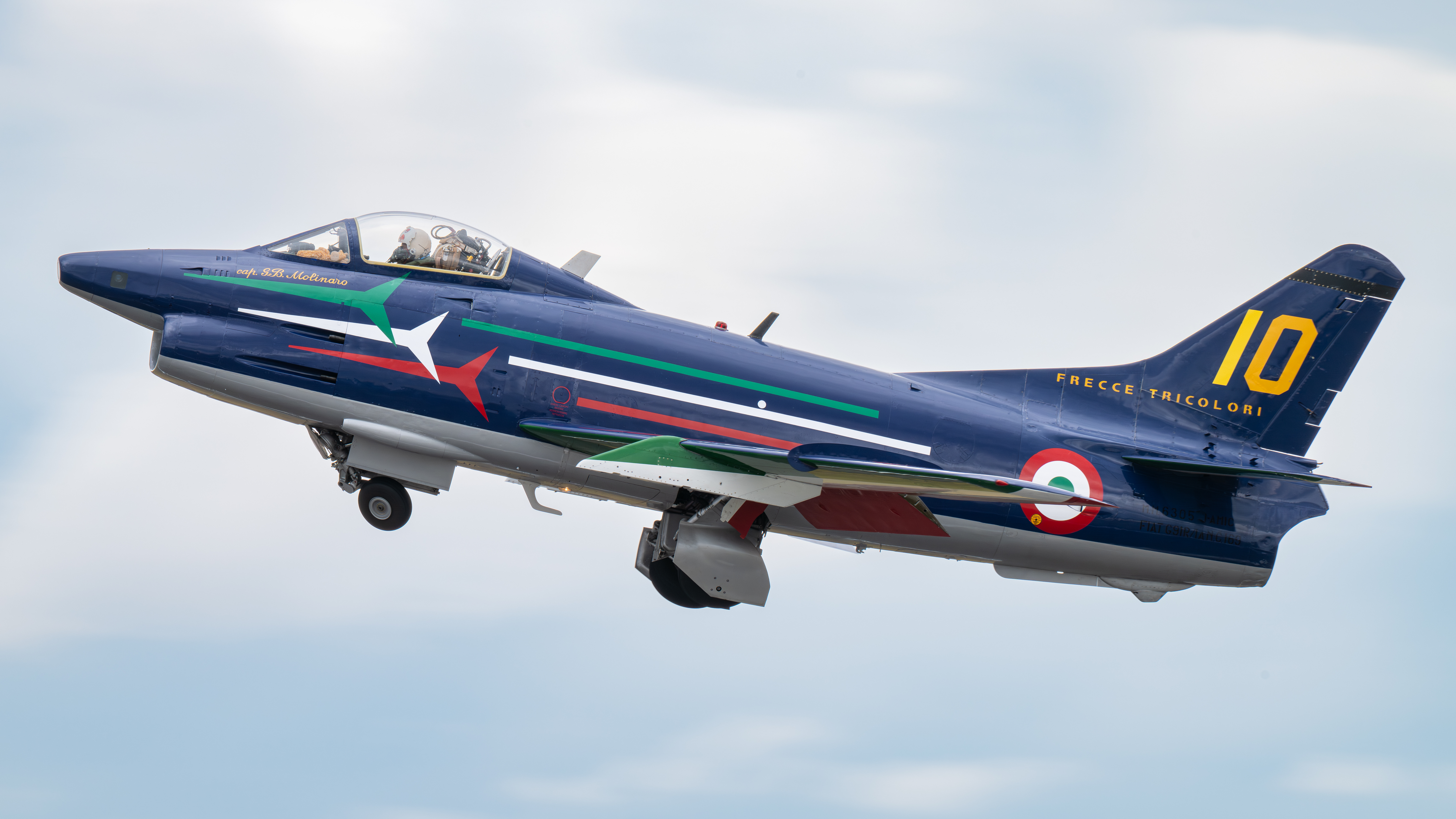
Fiat G.91 in the livery of the Frecce Tricolori.

The Frecce Tricolori flew on North American F-86 Sabre until 1963. The staff, initially not as numerous as today, was enlarged in 1963 to nine elements plus the soloist, adding the possibility of using coloured fumes. The following year the Fiat G.91PAN fighter-bombers arrived, then moved to the current Aermacchi MB-339 A/PAN MLU in 1982.

On 28 August 1988, the PAN was the protagonist of the Ramstein air show disaster, one of the worst air show disasters in history, in which 67 spectators and three pilots died and 346 spectators sustained serious injuries. Two of the three dead pilots, Mario Naldini and Ivo Nutarelli, were supposed to testify at the trial for the Itavia Flight 870 a few days later. This was the cause of various suspicions and conspiracy theories about what happened that day.

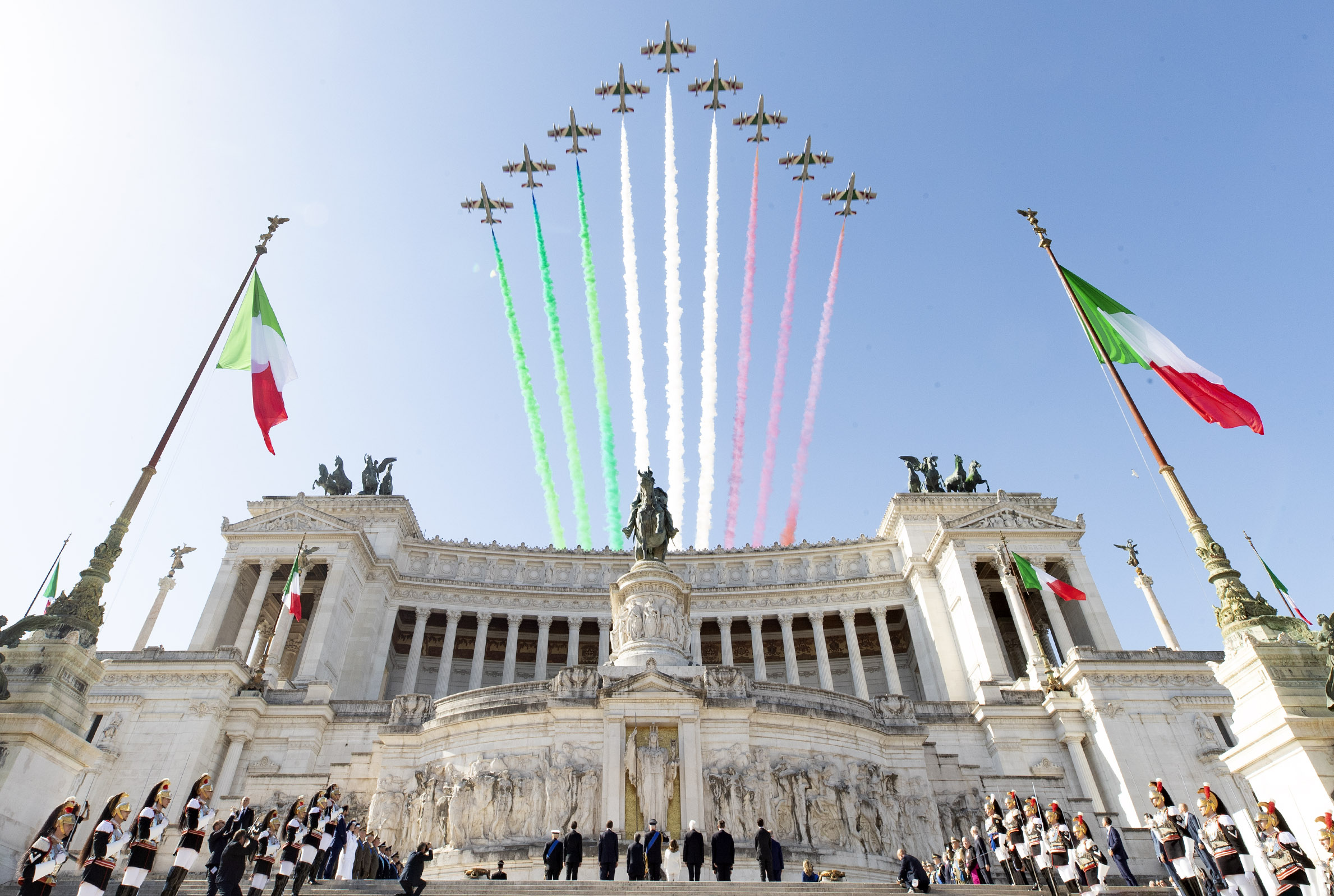
The Frecce Tricolori fly over the Victor Emmanuel II Monument during the celebrations of the Festa della Repubblica in 2022

In 2000 they reached 50,000 flying hours on the Aermacchi MB-339.

In 2005 they won the award for best exhibition at the Royal International Air Tattoo at Fairford, England. They were the first non-Russian unit to receive the Russian Silver Medal for Aeronautical Merit. On 8 September 2007 the Frecce Tricolori took part at the funeral of Luciano Pavarotti in Modena and honoured him with a fly-past leaving green-white-red smoke trails.

The replacement (scheduled for 2017) of the MB-339PAN with Alenia Aermacchi M.345 HET (High-Efficiency Trainer), announced in 2013, was blocked in 2014, reconfirmed in 2016 with entry into service scheduled for 2020; however, as of 2024 the team was still flying the MB-339PAN.

On 12 September 2024, the Italian Air Force announced that Frecce Tricolori would use Alenia Aermacchi M-346 Master as their new aircraft.

== Description ==
=== Aircraft features ===
The livery of the Aermacchi MB-339 used by the Group is given by the characteristic tricolour band that crosses the side of the plane against a savoy blue background. The airplane's abdomen is light gray while the formation numbers are yellow stickers. For the classic Aermacchi MB-339 A under the Italian Air Force the wingtip tanks were removed for two reasons:

1. penalize the acrobatic performance of the aircraft, in particular, the fast tonneaux due to a considerable mass placed far from the axis of rotation;
2. would make it more difficult to maintain tight formation during acrobatic manoeuvres, partially inhibiting the view of the aircraft next to which one is flying and thus depriving the "gregari" of precise reference points for maintaining the position.

Mixed subalary tanks are thus created, containing both vaseline oil for fumes and a certain amount of fuel to partially compensate for the reduction in autonomy caused by the removal of wingtip tanks. Larger subalar fuel tanks (pylon tanks), already provided for at the origin, can be installed on the external subaltern pylons for long-range transfer flights. On the occasion of the first cruise in USA-Canada (1986), special cylindrical tip tanks were set up, with a capacity much higher than that of the original elliptical tip-tank. These cylindrical tip tanks, added to the nylon tanks, provide adequate autonomy for large stops in the North Atlantic, allowing even a digression on a possible diversion airport.

The coloured smoke is generated by dispersion, and is composed of vaseline oil to which non-polluting pigments are added. The escape of this compound occurs through a small tube placed in the rear exhaust of the plane.

=== Formation ===
During the performances, the formation of the acrobatic patrol is usually composed of 9 aircraft, called "Pony", each labelled with a number ranging from 1 to 10. The name "Pony" was coined by the then Captain Zeno Tascio to remember the horse of Francesco Baracca which is the sign of the 4th Wing, at the time 4th Airbase who was already preparing to take over the task PAN for the 1961. Depending on the needs of the Department, aircraft can also be 11 in total, thus including the figure of the acrobatic training manager.

Passage of the Frecce Tricolori in Florence on 28 March 2018 for the celebrations of the 95th anniversary of the establishment of the Italian Air Force

- Pony 0 - Commander
- Pony 1 - Head of Formation
- Pony 2 - 1° Left Domestique
- Pony 3 - 1° Right Domestique
- Pony 4 - 2° Left Domestique
- Pony 5 - 2° Right Domestique
- Pony 6 - 1° Tail light
- Pony 7 - 3° Left Domestique
- Pony 8 - 3° Right Domestique
- Pony 9 - 2° Tail light
- Pony 10 - Soloist
- Pony 11 - Acrobatic Training Supervisor
- Pony 12 - Pilot in Training
- Pony 13 - Pilot in Training
- Pony 14 - Pilot in Training
- Pony 15 - Pilot in Training
- Pony 16 - Pilot in Training

== Flight programs and pilot selection ==
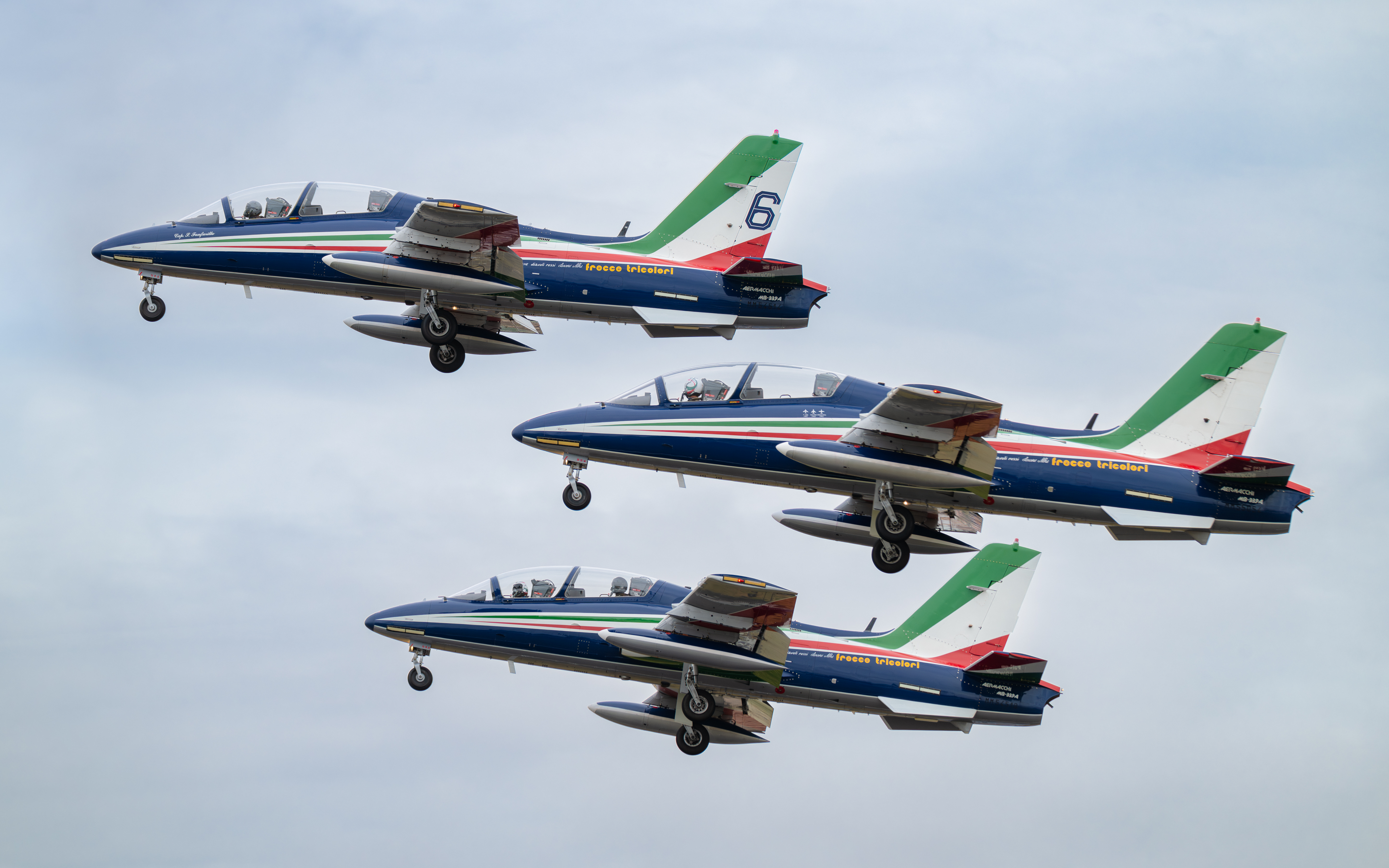
Close formation of Frecce Tricolori at the Royal International Air Tattoo held in Fairford in 2025

The Frecce Tricolori have three programs for performing acrobatics: high, low, and flat, depending on the weather conditions and the characteristics of the exhibition area. The high program is chosen when the cloud base is above 1,000 m and is characterized by the execution of the acrobatic figures entirely on the vertical plane; the low program is preferred instead when the clouds do not exceed 500 to 600 metres (1,600 to 2,000 ft) and vertical manoeuvres are not carried out (such as looping or the bomb); finally, the flat variant includes low-level formation manoeuvres.

For several years, when possible, the PAN performances have ended with the complete line-up drawing a 5-kilometre-long (3.1 mi) flag of Italy in the sky while from the floor speakers, the voice of Luciano Pavarotti intones the finale of Nessun dorma for the entire duration of the passage. The first realization of this manoeuvre took place in Pratica di Mare (frazione of Pomezia) during the farewell ceremony at the F-104 Starfighter and this earned the Frecce Tricolori the world record for the longest national flag ever made. Also for this reason, on September 8, 2007, hurtling through the Modena sky, the Frecce Tricolori paid tribute to Pavarotti whose funeral he had just held.

Only the best pilots have access to the Frecce Tricolori: each year one or two of them are chosen strictly among those who have more than 1,000 flight hours, and once they have entered they must follow a gradual insertion training program.

== Incidents ==
Below is a list of the accidents that occurred to the pilots of the Frecce Tricolori:

Pilot	Aircraft	Position	Circumstance	Result	Place	Date
Massimo Raffaello Scala	F-86E Sabre	Pony 3	Training	Deceased	Rivolto Air Base	3 May 1961
Gianni Pinato	F-86E Sabre	Pony 4	Training	Survived	Rivolto Air Base	3 May 1961
Gianbattista Ceoletta	F-86E Sabre		Training	Survived	Rivolto Air Base	21 August 1961
Mauro Venturini	F-86E Sabre		Training	Deceased	Rivolto Air Base	30 August 1961
Eugenio Colucci	F-86E Sabre	Pony 5	Air show	Deceased	Forlì	5 May 1963
Ennio Anticoli	F-86E Sabre	Pony 8	Air show	Survived	Forlì	5 May 1963
Raffaele D'Andretta	Fiat G.91PAN	Pony 3	Training	Deceased	Rivolto Air Base	22 March 1967
Giancarlo Bonollo	Fiat G.91PAN	Pony 6	Training	Survived	Bertiolo	12 December 1969
Valentino Jansa	Fiat G.91PAN	Pony 9	Training	Deceased	Palmanova	22 September 1971
Angelo Gays	Fiat G.91PAN	Pony 7	Air show	Deceased	Pratica di Mare	2 June 1973
Antonio Gallus	Fiat G.91PAN	Pony 4	Air show	Survived	Pratica di Mare	2 June 1973
Sandro Santilli	Fiat G.91PAN	Pony 9	Training	Deceased	Rivolto Air Base	14 March 1974
Ivano Poffe	Fiat G.91PAN	Pony 7	Training	Deceased	Rivolto Air Base	14 March 1974
Graziano Carrer	Fiat G.91PAN	Pony 2	Training	Deceased	Rivolto Air Base	12 July 1978
Andrea Di Paoli	Fiat G.91PAN	Pony 4	Training	Survived	Rivolto Air Base	12 July 1978
Piergianni Petri	Fiat G.91PAN	Pony 2	Air show	Deceased	Mildenhall (England)	27 May 1979
Vito Posca	Fiat G.91PAN	Pony 4	Training	Survived	Rivolto	9 April 1980
Pasqualino Gorga	Fiat G.91PAN	6251 - 7	Training	Unharmed	Treviso	29 June 1981
Antonio Gallus	Fiat G.91PAN	Pony 1	Training	Deceased	Rivolto Air Base	2 September 1981
Fabio Brovedani	Fiat G.91PAN	Pony 2	Training	Survived	Rivolto Air Base	2 September 1981
Vito Posca	MB-339PAN	Pony 1	Transfer	Survived	Chiusaforte	4 September 1984
John Miglio	MB-339PAN	Pony 11	Training	Deceased	Rivolto Air Base	20 February 1985
Mario Naldini	MB-339PAN	Pony 1	Air show	Deceased, 67 civilian fatalities	Ramstein AFB (Germany)	28 August 1988
Giorgio Alessio	MB-339PAN	Pony 2	Air show	Deceased, 67 civilian fatalities	Ramstein AFB (Germany)	28 August 1988
Ivo Nutarelli	MB-339PAN	Pony 10	Air show	Deceased, 67 civilian fatalities	Ramstein AFB (Germany)	28 August 1988
Paolo Scoponi	MB-339PAN	Pony 10	Training	Deceased	Rivolto Air Base	12 December 1988
Andrea Braga; Stefano Commisso	MB-339PAN	Pony 9	Training	Survived	Rivolto Air Base	27 October 2002
Oscar Del Dó	MB-339PAN	Pony 4	Take off	Survived, 1 civilian fatality	Turin Airport	16 September 2023
unannounced	MB-339PAN	Pony 6	Air show	Unharmed	Pantelleria	6 May 2025
Luca Battistoni	MB-339PAN	Pony 8	Air show	Survived, knee injury	Pantelleria	6 May 2025
unannounced	MB-339PAN	Pony 9	Air show	Unharmed	Pantelleria	6 May 2025

== See also ==
- List of aerobatic teams

== Sources ==
- Luigino, Caliaro (2005). "Frecce Tricolori". Pattuglie acrobatiche. Mondovì: Edizioni Gribaudo. ISBN 88-8058-873-7.
