= Data imaginaries =

Concept in critical data studies

Data imaginaries are a form of cultural imaginary related to social conceptions of data, a concept that comes from the field of critical data studies. A data imaginary is a particular framing of data that defines what data are and what can be done with them. Imaginaries are produced by social institutions and practices and they influence how people understand and use the object of the imaginary, in this case data.

Different data imaginaries compete to be considered common sense. The current most established data imaginary is that of data analytics, which treats data as a neutral resource from which people can extract value. Competing imaginaries include those of data activists, prioritizing data justice, and critical data studies, prioritizing consideration of the context around data.

== Theoretical basis ==
A data imaginary is a particular framing of data, according to Kitchin consisting of "how [data] are understood and normatively conceived of within a population or by stakeholders." It is a social constructivist theoretical concept that comes from the field of critical data studies, which is concerned with identifying these frames and questioning them rather than just taking them at face value. According to Baack, this context is important to consider, as "what data [afford] to whom does not only depend on the technological properties of data, but is fundamentally social, and both culturally and historically situated." Examining data imaginaries treats the narratives around data as separate from the data themselves, focusing on the former.

The concept of data imaginaries draws on the sociological imaginary. In sociology, imaginaries are social constructions that stem from social institutions and practices that prioritize different aspects of a social structure, in this case ideas about the use of data. According to Vanheeswijck, one of the most significant writers on this topic is Charles Taylor in his book A Secular Age, which defines social imaginaries as common understandings that facilitate collective actions and exist in cultural practices rather than being theoretically articulated. Another contributory work to this field is Benedict Anderson's book Imagined Communities, which argues that nationalism is based in "imagined communities" formed around geography and data tools such as censuses. This concept is a geographically focused understanding of data imaginaries. Theories of the social imaginary assert that these constructions are not fake or meaningless, as they direct how people think about a concept like data and what they think is able to be done with them. According to Denick, social imaginaries enable social practices by providing ways to understand the world. Data imaginaries are the narratives that shape how people conceive of and act upon data, though data do not always live up to the ideal aspirations presented.

== Competing imaginaries ==
According to Kitchin, "different groups hold varying data imaginaries, concerning what data are generated and how, for what purpose," and how they "can serve particular agendas." People with differing opinions on how data should be used may share the same imaginary, which is concerned instead with how data can be used. People with alternative data imaginaries can challenge and reinterpret dominant ideas to promote their own understandings. Since this is a competition of ideas, a particular imaginary is 'successful' when people, the more the better, consider that imaginary common sense, i.e. the obvious way the world works.

=== Data analytics ===
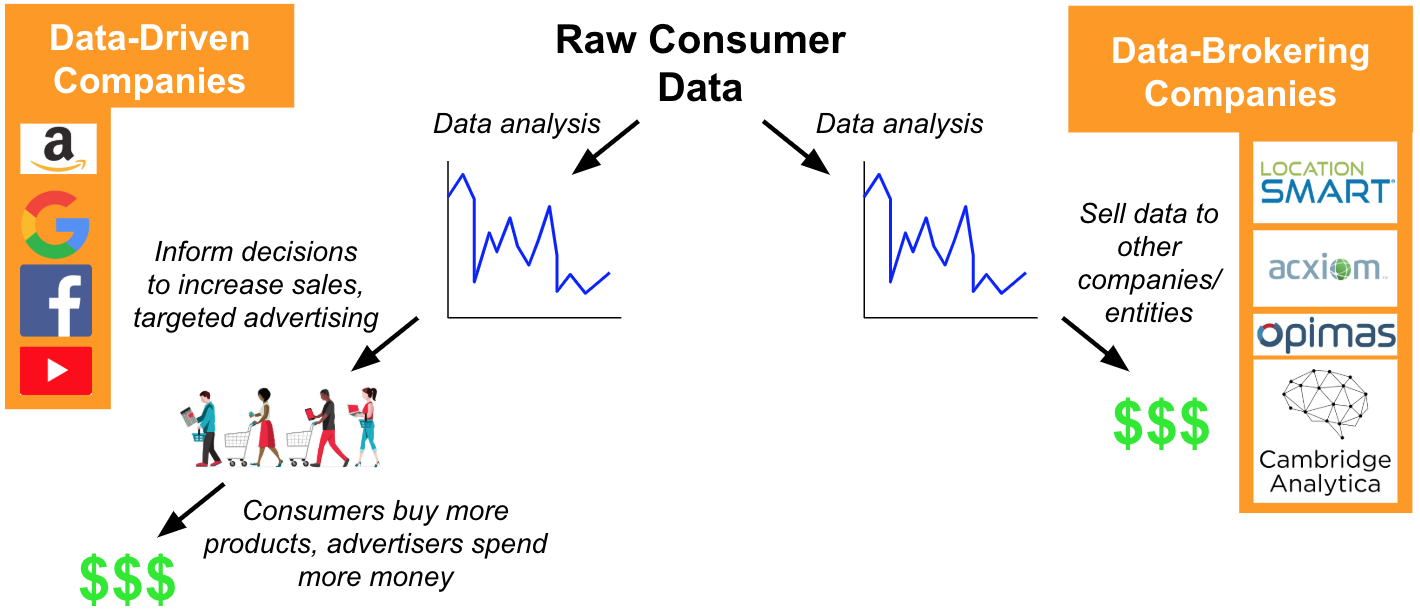
Companies that harness data to increase profits and members of the data broker industry share a data analytics data imaginary, though they have different business practices.

The data analytics imaginary is the most established one in modern western society. Kitchin has defined it as framing data as "speedy (rapid insights), accessible (easily interpreted), revealing (extracting hidden knowledge), panoramic (all-seeing), prophetic (able to foresee and shape the future), and smart (possessing latent intelligence)." This imaginary treats data as a single social or economic resource akin to a product like oil, requiring an equivalent supporting infrastructure. Data are considering a mine-able resource from which value can be extracted.

An example of the influence of this framing, according to Cinnamon, is how data are considered the primary solution for urban challenges. Furthermore, grassroots civic activism involving data often embraces this imaginary, challenging particular uses of data but not the notions of how they can be used.

=== Data activists ===
Data activists have competing imaginaries to the more common data analytics imaginary. These can vary depending on individual priorities, as they are not as well established, but they tend to prioritize data justice and community-oriented politics. These imaginaries challenge current assumptions around datafication in the modern world.

An example of this framing being used, according to Segura and Waisbord, is activist efforts to oppose social and institutional issues such as gender-based violence and police violence in Latin America by documenting the problems and using the data gathered to advocate for solutions. Under this perspective, data are treated as tools to achieve some form of justice rather than as a neutral resource.

=== Critical data studies ===
Critical data studies, the academic discipline that produced the notion of data imaginaries, has its own imaginary. This imaginary is particularly concerned with the role of power and politics, seeing data as situated within "a complex assemblage that actively shapes their constitution" according to Rob Kitchin, a leading scholar in the field. Critical data studies challenges the assumption that data are inherently neutral, calling out the framing processes that arise in the methodologies and epistemologies that are applied to data.
