= Imaginary (sociology) =

Set of common values, laws and symbols

The imaginary (or social imaginary) is the set of values, institutions, laws, and symbols through which people imagine their social whole. It is common to the members of a particular social group and the corresponding society. The concept of the imaginary has attracted attention in anthropology, sociology, psychoanalysis, philosophy, and media studies.

== Definitions ==
In Jean-Paul Sartre's 1940 book The Imaginary: A Phenomenological Psychology of the Imagination, the concept of the imagination and the nature of human consciousness is discussed. Subsequent thinkers have extended Sartre's ideas in the realms of philosophy and sociology.

For John Thompson, the social imaginary is "the creative and symbolic dimension of the social world, the dimension through which human beings create their ways of living together and their ways of representing their collective life".

For Manfred Steger and Paul James "imaginaries are patterned convocations of the social whole. These deep-seated modes of understanding provide largely pre-reflexive parameters within which people imagine their social existence—expressed, for example, in conceptions of 'the global', 'the national', 'the moral order of our time'."

John R. Searle uses the expression "social reality" rather than "social imaginary".

=== Castoriadis ===
In 1975, Cornelius Castoriadis used the term in his book The Imaginary Institution of Society, maintaining that 'the imaginary of the society ... creates for each historical period its singular way of living, seeing and making its own existence'. For Castoriadis, "the central imaginary significations of a society ... are the laces which tie a society together and the forms which define what, for a given society, is 'real'".

In similar fashion, Habermas wrote of 'the massive background of an intersubjectively shared lifeworld ... lifeworld contexts that provided the backing of a massive background consensus'.

=== Lacan ===
"The imaginary is presented by Lacan as one of the three intersecting orders that structure all human existence, the others being the symbolic and the real". According to David Macey, Lacan was responding to Sartre's 1940 reference to the image as a form of consciousness. Lacan also drew on the way "Melanie Klein pushes back the limits within which we can see the subjective function of identification operate", in her work on phantasy – something extended by her followers to the analysis of how "we are all prone to be drawn into social phantasy systems ... the experience of being in a particular set of human collectivities". "While it is only in the early years of childhood that human beings live entirely in the Imaginary, it remains distinctly present throughout the life of the individual".

The imaginary as a Lacanian term refers to an illusion and fascination with an image of the body as a coherent unity, deriving from the dual relationship between the ego and the specular or mirror image. This illusion of coherence, control and totality is by no means unnecessary or inconsequential. "The term 'imaginary' is obviously cognate with 'fictive' but in its Lacanian sense it is not simply synonymous with fictional or unreal; on the contrary, imaginary identifications can have very real effects".

=== Taylor ===
Canadian philosopher Charles Taylor uses the concept of modern social imaginaries to explore the Western transition from the hierarchical norms of pre-modern social imaginaries to the egalitarian, horizontal, direct access social imaginary of modernity. He sees the Renaissance ideal of civility and self-fashioning as a sort of halfway house on the road to modernity and modern morality. The modern social imaginary he considers comprises a system of interlocking spheres, including reflexivity and the social contract public opinion and Habermas' public sphere, the political-market economy as an independent force, and the self-government of citizens within a society as a normative ideal.

Taylor has acknowledged the influence of Benedict Anderson in his formulation of the concept of the social imaginary. Anderson treated the nation as "an imagined political community ... nation-ness, as well as nationalism, are cultural artifacts of a particular kind".

== Ontology ==
While not constituting an established reality, the social imaginary is nevertheless an institution in as much as it represents the system of meanings that govern a given social structure. These imaginaries are to be understood as historical constructs defined by the interactions of subjects in society. In that sense, the imaginary is not necessarily "real" as it is an imagined concept contingent on the imagination of a particular social subject. Nevertheless, there remains some debate among those who use the term (or its associated terms, such as imaginaire) as to the ontological status of the imaginary. Some, such as Henry Corbin, understand the imaginary to be quite real indeed, while others ascribe to it only a social or imagined reality.

John R. Searle considered the ontology of the social imaginary to be complex, but that in practice "the complex structure of social reality is, so to speak, weightless and invisible. The child is brought up in a culture where he or she simply takes social reality for granted. ... The complex ontology seems simple". He added the subtle distinction that social reality was observer-relative, and so would "inherit that ontological subjectivity. But this ontological subjectivity does not prevent claims about observer-relative features from being epistemically objective".

== Technology ==
In 1995 George E. Marcus edited a book with the title Technoscientific Imaginaries which ethnographically explored contemporary science and technology. A collection of encounters in the technosciences by a collective of anthropologists and others, the volume aimed to find strategic sites of change in contemporary worlds that no longer fit traditional ideas and pedagogies and that are best explored through a collaborative effort among technoscientists and social scientists. While the Lacanian imaginary is only indirectly invoked, the interplay between emotion and reason, desire, the symbolic order, and the real are repeatedly probed. Crucial to the technical side of these imaginaries are the visual, statistical, and other representational modes of imaging that have both facilitated scientific developments and sometimes misdirected a sense of objectivity and certitude. Such work accepts that "technological meaning is historically grounded and, as a result, becomes located within a larger social imaginary".

In 2009, Sheila Jasanoff and Sang-Hyun Kim defined the 'sociotechnical imaginary' as "collectively imagined forms of social life and social order reflected in the design and fulfillment of nation-specific scientific and/or technological projects". Jasanoff and Kim's paper used contrasting US and South Korean approaches to nuclear technology as an example and is widely cited, particularly in the field of Science and Technology Studies. In later work, Stephen Hilgarnter and Jasanoff led a team comparing sixteen countries' responses to COVID-19, showing how different types of state envisioned and deployed different technological responses to the pandemic in keeping with their political cultures. Other scholars have loosened the state-based aspect of Jasanoff and Kim's definition to include any and all 'future-oriented visions of connected social and technological orders'. Examples include the ways in which different people and groups imagined the potential exploitation of the ocean's resources during the Cold War.

== Media imaginary ==
Several media scholars and historians have analyzed the imaginary of technologies as they emerge, such as early communication technology, mobile phones, and the Internet.

== Serial imaginary research ==
A recent research project led by a team from the Université Grenoble Alpes offers to develop the concept of the imaginary and an understanding of how it functions when faced with serial works of art.

This research, published in Imaginaire sériel: Les mécanismes sériels à l'oeuvre dans l'acte créatif (2017), subscribes to Gilbert Durand's Grenoble school of thought and both questions the impact of seriality on our imaginary and defines the imaginary of seriality.

The development of this concept allows a better understanding of the close link between the ability to condition and organize exchanges between an experience and its representation, and a procedure based on the rhythmical repetition of one, or several, paradigms in a determined and coherent body allowing their reproduction and inflection.

Serial works of art thus form a privileged field of studies since they turn this recursion and redundancy into structuring principles. The Durand school research tries to illustrate this serial conceptualization of the imaginary by analyzing serial literature, television series, comic books, serial music and dance, etc.

== Architectural imaginary ==
Peter Olshavsky has analyzed the imaginary in the field of architecture. Based on the work of Taylor, the imaginary is understood as a category of understanding social praxis and the reasons designers give to make sense of these practices.

Pavel Kunysz has also drawn from Castoriadis' understanding of social imaginary to study the roles of contemporary architectural practises in the transformation of social attachments to urban wastelands. His work bridges social imaginary literature with an anthropology of enchantment and place studies to propose a critic of architecture comprised within the generalization of creative practises in the transaesthetic era as proposed by Jean Serroy and Gilles Lipovetsky.

== See also ==
- Arjun Appadurai
- Gilbert Durand
- Consensus reality
- Engaged theory
- Ethnomethodology
- Imagined communities
- The Imaginary (psychoanalysis)
- The Imaginary (Sartre)
- L'Imagination symbolique
- Intersubjectivity
- Social meaning-making
- Sociological imagination
- Data imaginaries
