= Rivolto Air Base =

Rivolto Air Base Basa Aerea di Rivolto
- IATA: none; ICAO: LIPI

Summary
- Airport type: Military
- Owner/Operator: Italian Air Force
- Location: Codroipo, Udine, FVG, Italy
- Occupants: Frecce Tricolori
- Elevation AMSL: 179 ft / 55 m
- Coordinates: 45°58′54″N 13°03′03″E

Map
- Rivolto Air Base

Runways
Direction	Length		Surface
Direction	ft	m	Surface
06/24	9,810	2,900	asphalt concrete

Rivolto Air Base (IATA: none, ICAO: LIPI) is an Italian Air Force (Aeronautica Militare) air base located in Codroipo, province of Udine (Italy). It is the home base of the Frecce Tricolori aerobatic display team. Besides a military airport it is an important air force Meteorological Service station. Rivolto Air Base was founded after the Italian Royal Decree N. 2207 of 1923, authorised the establishment of new airports and expropriate land for their construction.

== Description ==
The airport is managed by the Italian Air Force and on the basis of the Ministerial Decree of 25 January 2008, published in the Official Gazette of 7 March 2008, the airport is classified as MOB (Main Operating Base) of the first group and as such performs exclusively military, not being open to commercial traffic. The airport is known above all because it is the seat of the Frecce Tricolori, the Italian national aerobatic team (PAN) and constituting the 313th Acrobatic Training Group.

Seat of the 2nd Wing is named after Mario Visintini, the first of the flying aces of the Regia Aeronautica, decorated with the Gold Medal of Military Valour. Visintini was the top scoring pilot of all belligerent air forces in Eastern Africa (Africa Orientale) and the top biplane fighter ace of World War II; he achieved all his air victories flying the Fiat CR.42 biplane.The 14th Group with AMX International AMX fighter-bombers was also based in the Rivolto military airport until 2004.

Since 2011 the base has become a national missile hub, while since January 2016 the Rivolto airport has been the reference point for the Integrated University Hospital of Udine for night flights in favor of the Friuli Venezia Giulia Regional Transplant Center. In 2016, thanks to the night activation of the airport, 16 lives were saved. There is also an important meteorological station of the air force Meteorological Service, part of the World Meteorological Organization (WMO), at the airport.
