= Edward Younger =

Edward Younger may refer to:

- Edward Younger, 3rd Viscount Younger of Leckie, Scottish nobleman
- Edward F. Younger, American soldier selected to choose the body that would become the Unknown Soldier
