= Festa della Repubblica =

Italian National Day, Republic Day and public holiday on 2 June

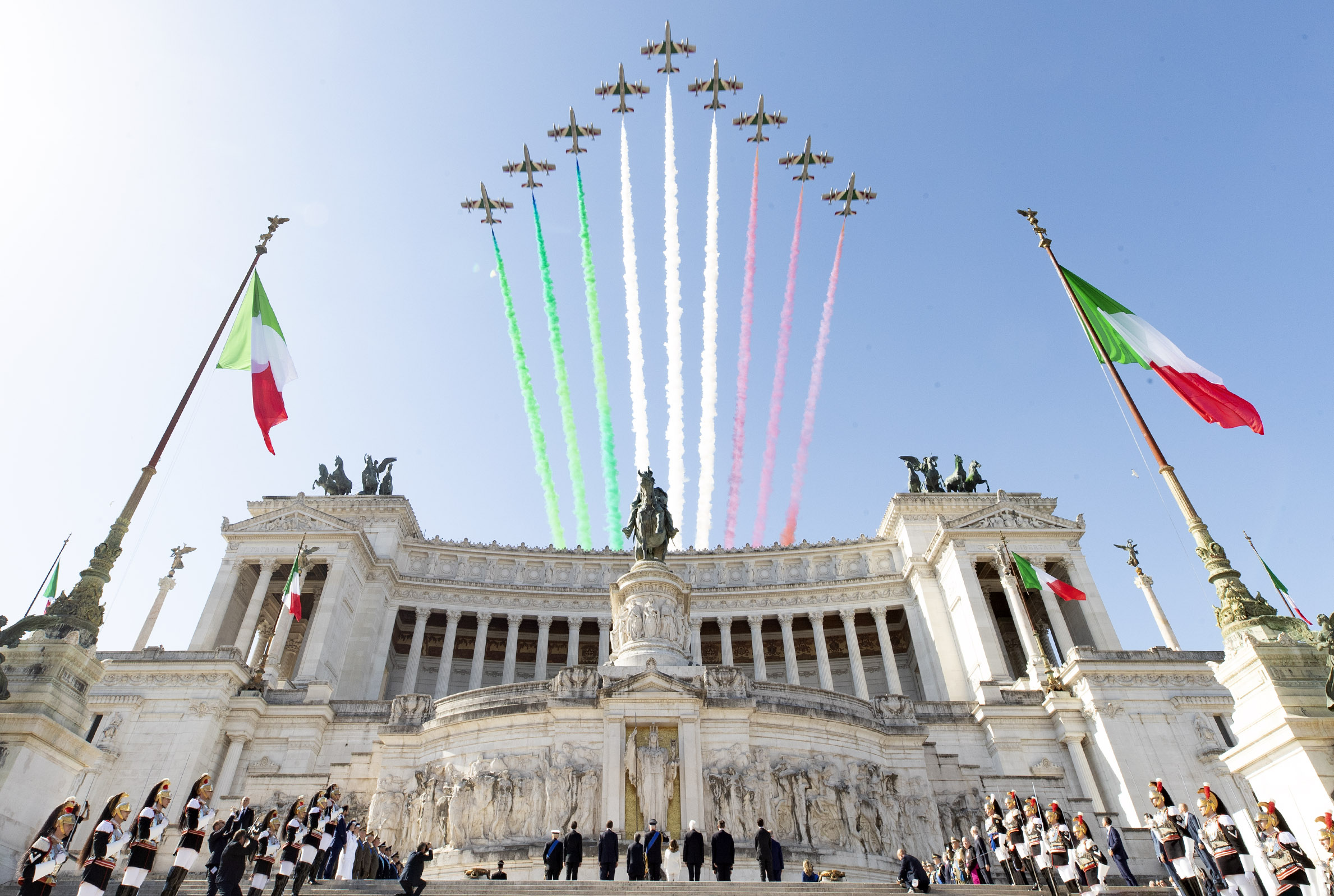
- The Frecce Tricolori, with the smoke trail representing the national colours of Italy, above the Altare della Patria during the celebrations of the Festa della Repubblica in 2022
- Official name: Italian: Festa della Repubblica
- Also called: The Second of June (Italian: Il Due Giugno)
- Observed by: Italy
- Type: National
- Significance: Italy became a republic after the results of the 1946 Italian institutional referendum
- Celebrations: Official ceremonies, parades, fireworks, concerts, picnics
- Date: 2 June
- Next time: 2 June 2027
- Frequency: annual
- First time: 2 June 1947
- Related to: Tricolour Day (7 January); National Memorial Day of the Exiles and Foibe (10 February); Anniversary of the Unification of Italy (17 March); Anniversary of the Liberation (25 April); National Unity and Armed Forces Day (4 November)

Festa della Repubblica (Italian: [ˈfɛsta della reˈpubblika]; English: Republic Day) is the Italian National Day and Republic Day, which is celebrated on 2 June each year, with the main celebration taking place in Rome. The Festa della Repubblica is one of the national symbols of Italy.

The day commemorates the 1946 Italian institutional referendum held by universal suffrage, in which the Italian people were called to the polls to decide on the form of government following the Second World War and the fall of Fascism.

The ceremony of the event, organized in Rome, includes the deposition of a laurel wreath as a tribute to the Italian Unknown Soldier at the Altare della Patria by the President of the Italian Republic and a military parade along Via dei Fori Imperiali in Rome.

== Background ==
=== Republican ideas and the unification of Italy ===
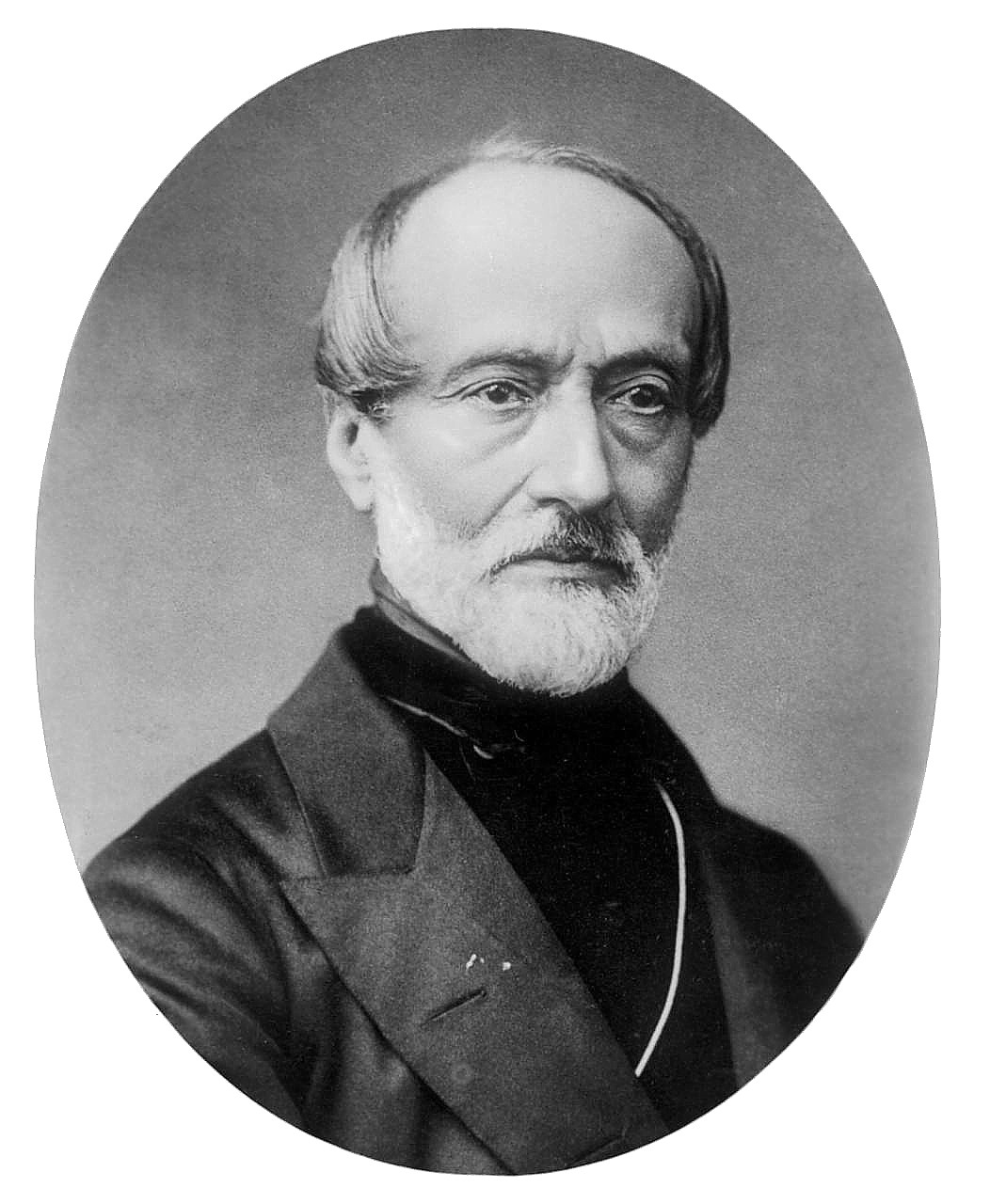
Giuseppe Mazzini. His thoughts influenced many politicians of a later period, among them Woodrow Wilson, David Lloyd George, Mahatma Gandhi, Golda Meir and Jawaharlal Nehru.

In the history of Italy there are several so-called "republican" governments that have followed one another over time. Examples are the ancient Roman Republic and the medieval maritime republics. From Cicero to Niccolò Machiavelli, Italian philosophers have imagined the foundations of political science and republicanism. (Note: Jean-Jacques Rousseau notes, in The Social Contract, about Niccolò Machiavelli and his work The Prince: "Pretending to give lessons to kings, he gave great lessons to the people. The Prince is the book of the republicans." (see Rousseau – Du Contrat social éd. Beaulavon 1903.djvu/237 – Wikisource.) But it was Giuseppe Mazzini who revived the republican idea in Italy in the 19th century.

An Italian nationalist in the historical radical tradition and a proponent of a republicanism of social-democratic inspiration, Mazzini helped define the modern European movement for popular democracy in a republican state. Mazzini's thoughts had a very considerable influence on the Italian and European republican movements, in the Constitution of Italy, about Europeanism and more nuanced on many politicians of a later period, among them American president Woodrow Wilson, British prime minister David Lloyd George, Mahatma Gandhi, Israeli prime minister Golda Meir and Indian prime minister Jawaharlal Nehru. Mazzini formulated a concept known as "thought and action" in which thought and action must be joined together and every thought must be followed by action, therefore rejecting intellectualism and the notion of divorcing theory from practice.

In July 1831, in exile in Marseille, Giuseppe Mazzini founded the Young Italy movement, which aimed to transform Italy into a unitary democratic republic, according to the principles of freedom, independence and unity, but also to oust the monarchic regimes pre-existing the unification, including the Kingdom of Sardinia. The foundation of the Young Italy constitutes a key moment of the Italian Risorgimento and this republican program precedes in time the proposals for the unification of Italy of Vincenzo Gioberti and Cesare Balbo, aimed at reunifying the Italian territory under the presidency of the Pope. Subsequently, the philosopher Carlo Cattaneo promoted a secular and republican Italy in the extension of Mazzini's ideas, but organized as a federal republic.

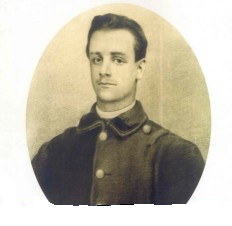
Pietro Barsanti, the first martyr of the modern Italian Republic

The political projects of Mazzini and Cattaneo were thwarted by the action of the Piedmontese Prime Minister Camillo Benso, Count of Cavour, and Giuseppe Garibaldi. The latter set aside his republican ideas to favor Italian unity. After having obtained the conquest of the whole of southern Italy during the Expedition of the Thousand, Garibaldi handed over the conquered territories to the king of Sardinia Victor Emmanuel II, which were annexed to the Kingdom of Sardinia after a plebiscite. This earned him heavy criticism from numerous republicans who accused him of treason. While a laborious administrative unification began, a first Italian parliament was elected and, on 17 March 1861, Victor Emmanuel II was proclaimed king of Italy.

From 1861 to 1946, Italy was a constitutional monarchy founded on the Albertine Statute, named after the king who promulgated it in 1848, Charles Albert of Sardinia. The parliament included a Senate, whose members were appointed by the king, and a Chamber of Deputies, elected by census vote. In 1861 only 2% of Italians had the right to vote. In the political panorama of the time there was a republican political movement which had its martyrs, such as the soldier Pietro Barsanti. Barsanti was a supporter of republican ideas, and was a soldier in the Royal Italian Army with the rank of corporal. He was sentenced to death and shot in 1870 for having favored an insurrectional attempt against the Savoy monarchy and is therefore considered the first martyr of the modern Italian Republic and a symbol of republican ideals in Italy.

=== Albertine Statute and liberal Italy ===
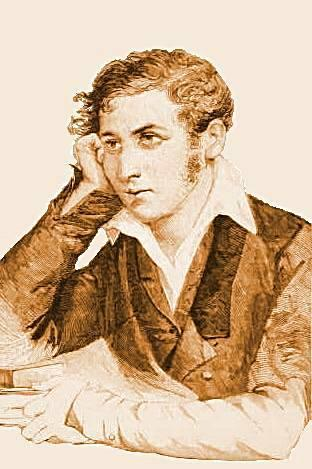
Carlo Cattaneo

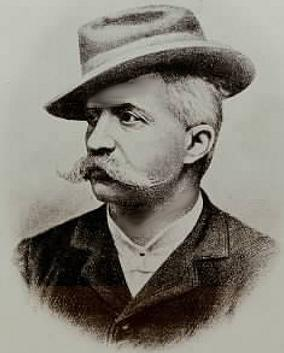
Felice Cavallotti

The balance of power between the Chamber and Senate initially shifted in favor of the Senate, composed mainly of nobles and industrial figures. Little by little, the Chamber of Deputies took on more and more importance with the evolution of the bourgeoisie and the large landowners, concerned with economic progress, but supporters of order and a certain social conservatism.

The Republicans took part in the elections to the Italian Parliament, and in 1853 they formed the Action Party around Giuseppe Mazzini. Although in exile, Mazzini was elected in 1866, but refused to take his seat in parliament. Carlo Cattaneo was elected deputy in 1860 and 1867, but refused so as not to have to swear loyalty to the House of Savoy. The problem of the oath of loyalty to the monarchy, necessary to be elected, was the subject of controversy within the republican forces. In 1873 Felice Cavallotti, one of the most committed Italian politicians against the monarchy, preceded his oath with a declaration in which he reaffirmed his republican beliefs. In 1882, a new electoral law lowered the census limit for voting rights, increasing the number of voters to over two million, equal to 7% of the population. In the same year the Italian Workers' Party was created, which in 1895 became the Italian Socialist Party. In 1895 the intransigent republicans agreed to participate in the political life of the Kingdom, establishing the Italian Republican Party. Two years later, the far left reached its historical maximum level in Parliament with 81 deputies, for the three radical-democratic, socialist components and Republican. With the death of Felice Cavallotti in 1898, the radical left gave up on posing the institutional problem.

In Italian politics, the socialist party progressively divided into two tendencies: a maximalist one, led among others by Arturo Labriola and Enrico Ferri, and supporting the use of strikes; the other, reformist and pro-government, was led by Filippo Turati. A nationalist movement emerged, led in particular by Enrico Corradini, as well as a Catholic social and democratic movement, the National Democratic League, led by Romolo Murri. In 1904, Pope Pius X authorized Catholics to participate individually in political life, but in 1909 he condemned the National Democratic League created by Romolo Murri, who was excommunicated. Finally, a law of 3 June 1912 marked Italy's evolution towards a certain political liberalism by establishing universal male suffrage. In 1914, at the outbreak of World War I, Italy began to be counted among the world's liberal democracies.

=== Fascism and World War II ===
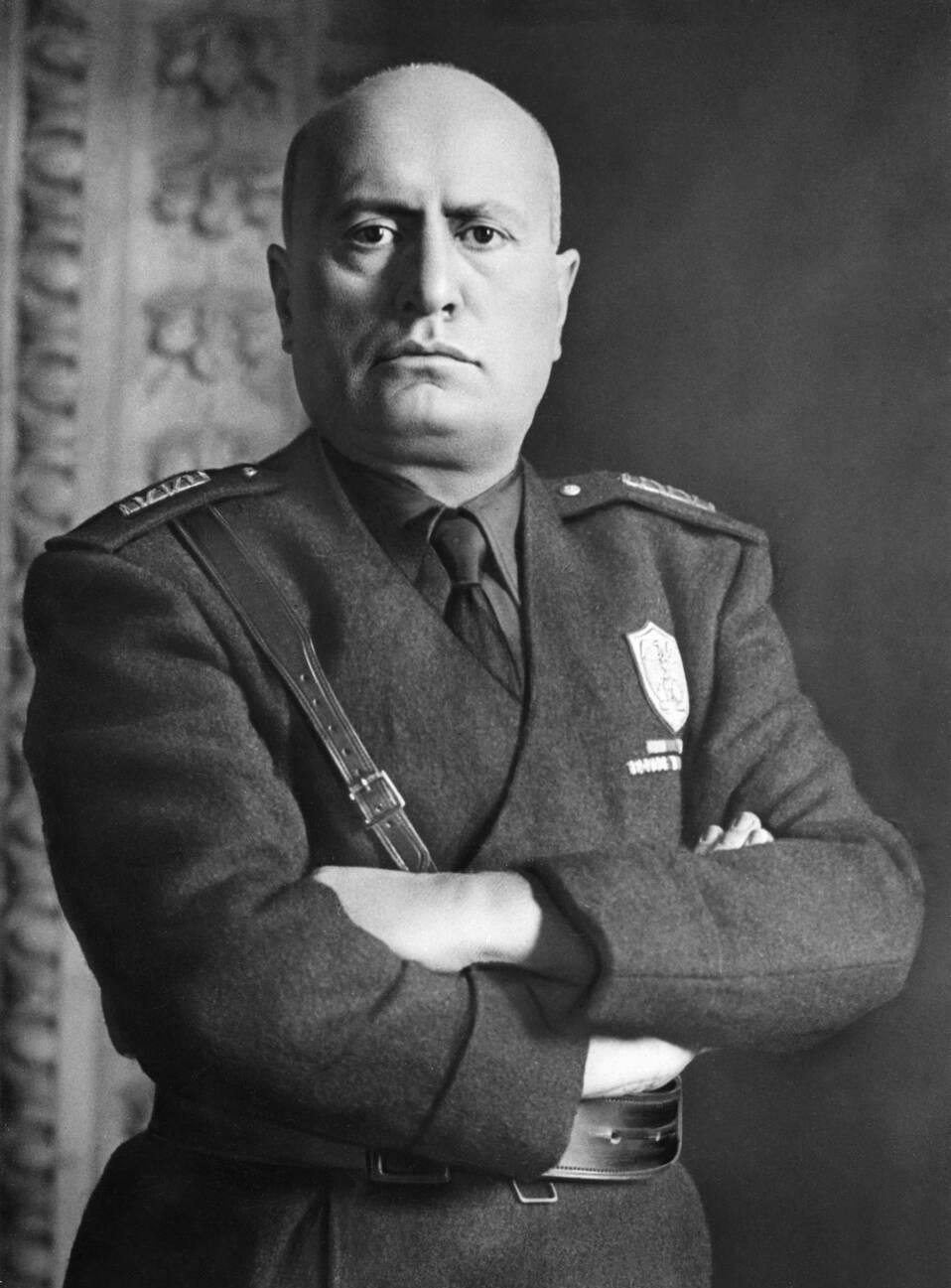
Benito Mussolini titled himself Duce and ruled the country from 1922 until his overthrow in 1943.

After World War I, Italian political life was animated by four great movements. Two of these movements were in favor of democratic development within the framework of existing monarchical institutions: the reformist socialists and the Italian People's Party. Two other movements challenged these institutions: the Republican Party on the one hand, and the maximalist socialists. In the 1919 elections, the parties most imbued with republican ideology (the maximalist socialists and the Republican Party) won, obtaining 165 out of 508 seats in the Chamber of Deputies. In the 1921 elections, after the foundation of the Italian Communist Party, the three parties republican, maximalist socialist and communist obtained 145 deputies out of 535. Overall, at the beginning of the interwar period, less than 30% of those elected were in favor of the establishment of a republican regime. In this context, the rise of Benito Mussolini's fascist movement was based on the bitterness generated by the "mutilated victory", the fear of social unrest and the rejection of revolutionary, republican and Marxist ideology. The liberal political system and part of the aristocracy chose to erect fascism as a bulwark against, in their way of seeing, these dangers.

King Victor Emmanuel III of Italy

In October 1922, the nomination of Benito Mussolini as prime minister by King Victor Emmanuel III, following the march on Rome, paved the way for the establishment of the dictatorship. The Albertine Statute was progressively emptied of its content. Parliament was subject to the will of the new government. (Note: The Chamber of Deputies was replaced in 1939 by Chamber of Fasces and Corporations.) The legal opposition disintegrated. On 27 June 1924, 127 deputies left Parliament and retreated to the Aventine Hill, a clumsy maneuver which, in effect, left the field open to the fascists. They then had the fate of Italy in their hands for two decades.

Flag of Arditi del Popolo, an axe cutting a fasces. Arditi del Popolo was a militant anti-fascist group founded in 1921.

With the implementation of fascist laws (Royal Decree of 6 November 1926), all political parties operating on Italian territory were dissolved, with the exception of the National Fascist Party. Some of these parties expatriated and reconstituted themselves abroad, especially in France. Thus an anti-fascist coalition was formed on 29 March 1927 in Paris, the "Concentrazione Antifascista Italiana", which brought together the Italian Republican Party, the Italian Socialist Party, the Socialist Unitary Party of Italian Workers, the Italian League for Human Rights and the foreign representation of the Italian General Confederation of Labour. Some movements remained outside, including the Italian Communist Party, the popular Catholic movement and other liberal movements. This coalition dissolved on 5 May 1934 and, in August of the same year, the pact of unity of action was signed between the Italian Socialist Party and the Italian Communist Party.

In the meantime, in Italy, clandestine anti-fascist nuclei were formed, in particular in Milan with Ferruccio Parri and in Florence with Riccardo Bauer. Under the impetus of these groups, the Action Party, Mazzini's former republican party, was re-established. (Note: The Action Party, reformed in 1942, constituted in 1944–1945 the second force within the National Liberation Committee. The political party with the largest number of partisan groups is then the Italian Communist Party.) Between the end of 1942 and the beginning of 1943, Alcide De Gasperi wrote The reconstructive ideas of Christian Democracy, which laid the foundations of the new Catholic-inspired party, the Christian Democracy. It brought together the veterans of Luigi Sturzo's Italian People's Party and the young people of Catholic associations, in particular of the University Federation.

Not only did Victor Emmanuel III appeal to Mussolini to form the government in 1922 and allow him to proceed with the domestication of Parliament, but he did not even draw the consequences of the assassination of Giacomo Matteotti in 1924. He accepted the title of emperor in 1936 at the end of Second Italo-Ethiopian War, then the alliance with Nazi Germany and Italy's entry into World War II on 10 June 1940.

Hostilities ended on 29 April 1945, when the German forces in Italy surrendered. Nearly half a million Italians (including civilians) died in World War II, society was divided and the Italian economy had been all but destroyed; per capita income in 1944 was at its lowest point since the beginning of the 20th century.

== History ==
1946 Italian institutional referendum results by province

On 2 and 3 June 1946, an institutional referendum was held with which the Italians were called to the polls to decide which form of state – monarchy or republic – to give to the country. The referendum was announced at the end of World War II, a few years after the fall of the Fascist regime in Italy, the dictatorial regime that had been supported by the Italian royal family, the House of Savoy, for more than 20 years.

The 1946 Italian general election to elect the Constituent Assembly of Italy was held on the same days. As with the simultaneous Constituent Assembly elections, the referendum was not held in the Julian March, in the province of Zara or the province of Bolzano, which were still under occupation by Allied forces pending a final settlement of the status of the territories. The Constituent Assembly was formed by representatives of the anti-fascist forces that contributed to the defeat of Nazi and Fascist forces during the liberation of Italy, in World War II.

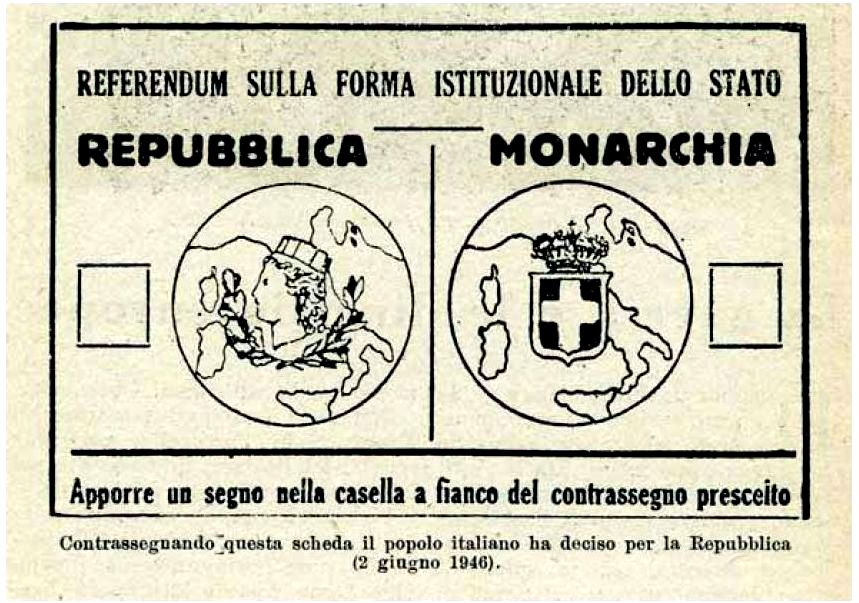
Electoral ballot of the 1946 Italian institutional referendum

The supporters of the republic chose the symbol of the Italia turrita, the national personification of Italy, to be used in the electoral campaign and on the referendum card on the institutional form of the State, in contrast to the Savoy coat of arms which represented the monarchy. This triggered various controversies, given that the iconography of the allegorical personification of Italy had, and still has, a universal and unifying meaning that should have been common to all Italians and not only to a part of them: this was the last appearance in the institutional context of Italia turrita.

This institutional referendum was the first vote by universal suffrage in Italy. The result of the popular consultation, 12,717,923 votes for the republic and 10,719,284 for the monarchy (with a percentage, respectively, of 54.3% and 45.7%), was communicated on 10 June 1946, when the Court of Cassation declared, after 85 years of the Kingdom of Italy, the birth of the Italian Republic, being definitively sanctioned on 18 June.

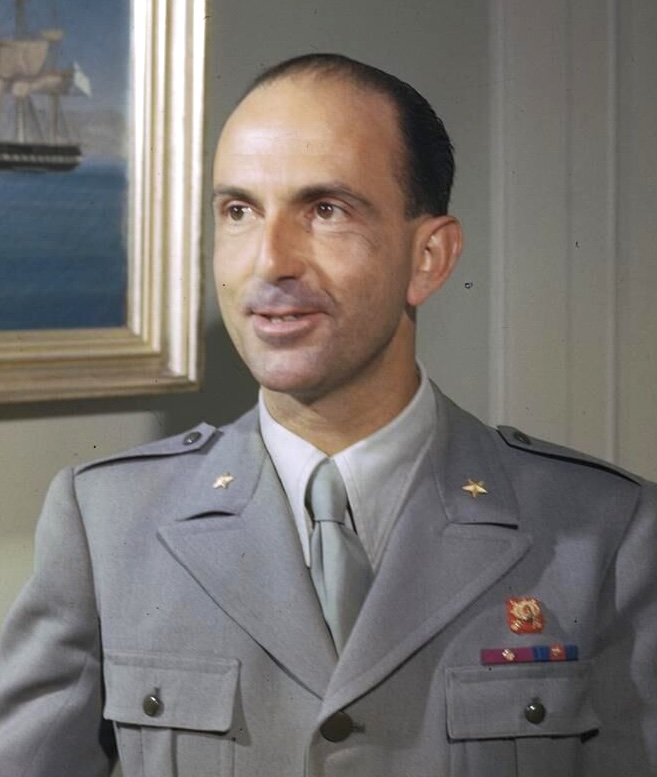
Umberto II of Italy, the last king of Italy

The King of Italy, Umberto II of Savoy, decided to leave Italy on 13 June to avoid the clashes between monarchists and Republicans, already manifested in bloody events in various Italian cities, for fear they could extend throughout the country. He went into exile in Portugal. From 1 January 1948, with the entry into force of the Constitution of the Italian Republic, the male descendants of Umberto II of Savoy were banned from entering Italy; this provision was eventually repealed in 2002. 11 June 1946, the first day of republican Italy, was declared a public holiday.

On 2 June the birth of the modern nation is celebrated in a similar way to the French 14 July (anniversary of the storming of the Bastille) and to 4 July in the United States (anniversary of the declaration of independence from Great Britain). The unity of Italy and the birth of the modern Italian state is celebrated on 17 March, in honour of 17 March 1861, the date of the proclamation of the Kingdom of Italy. Before the birth of the republic, the national celebratory day of the Kingdom of Italy was the feast of the Statuto Albertino, which was held on the first Sunday of June.

The first celebration of the Festa della Repubblica took place on 2 June 1947, while in 1948 there was the first parade in Via dei Fori Imperiali in Rome; 2 June was definitively declared a national holiday in 1949. On this occasion the ceremonial included the past review of the armed forces in honor of the republic by the President of the Italian Republic; the demonstration took place in Piazza Venezia, opposite the Altare della Patria. After the deposition of the laurel crown to the Italian Unknown Soldier by the President of the Italian Republic Luigi Einaudi, the banners of the armed forces abandoned the formation, they walked the stairway of the monument and paid homage to the president with a bow.

In 1949, with the entry of Italy into NATO, ten celebrations took place simultaneously throughout the country: on the occasion, to highlight the bond of the newly formed republic with Mazzinianism, current of the Risorgimento which was headed by Giuseppe Mazzini, fervent Republican, a celebratory monument was inaugurated in the current Piazzale Ugo La Malfa in Rome, in memory of the Genoese patriot, in front of which the main event of the Festa della Repubblica took place.

Italian Air Force Marching Band

In 1961 the main celebration of the Festa della Repubblica did not take place in Rome but in Turin, the first capital of a united Italy. Turin was the capital of Italy from 1861 to 1865, followed by Florence (1865–1871) and finally by Rome, which is its capital since 1871. In 1961, in fact, was also celebrated the centenary of the unification of Italy (1861–1961). In 1963 the demonstration was not carried out on 2 June for the health conditions of Pope John XXIII, now dying, and was postponed to 4 November, simultaneously with National Unity and Armed Forces Day.

In 1965 the banners of the suppressed military units that took part in the World War I also participated in the main celebration of Rome; in that year the 50th anniversary of Italy's entry into the First World War was also commemorated. Specifically, Italy officially began military operations in World War I on 24 May 1915, with the first cannon shot fired by Fort Verena, on the Asiago plateau, towards the Austrian fortresses located on the Vezzena Plain: to the first infantry of the Royal Italian Army that crossed the border is dedicated the first stanza of La Leggenda del Piave.

Due to the severe economic crisis that gripped Italy in the 1970s, to contain state and social costs, the Festa della Repubblica, with Law n. 54 of 5 March 1977, was moved to the first Sunday of June, with the consequent suppression of 2 June as a public holiday connected to it. In 2001, on the impulse of the then President of the Republic, Carlo Azeglio Ciampi, who was the protagonist, at the beginning of the 21st century, of a more general action to promote national symbols of Italy, the Festa della Repubblica has abandoned the status of a moveable feast, summarizing its traditional location of 2 June, which has now returned to being a holiday in all respects.

== The symbolic photo of the birth of the Republic ==
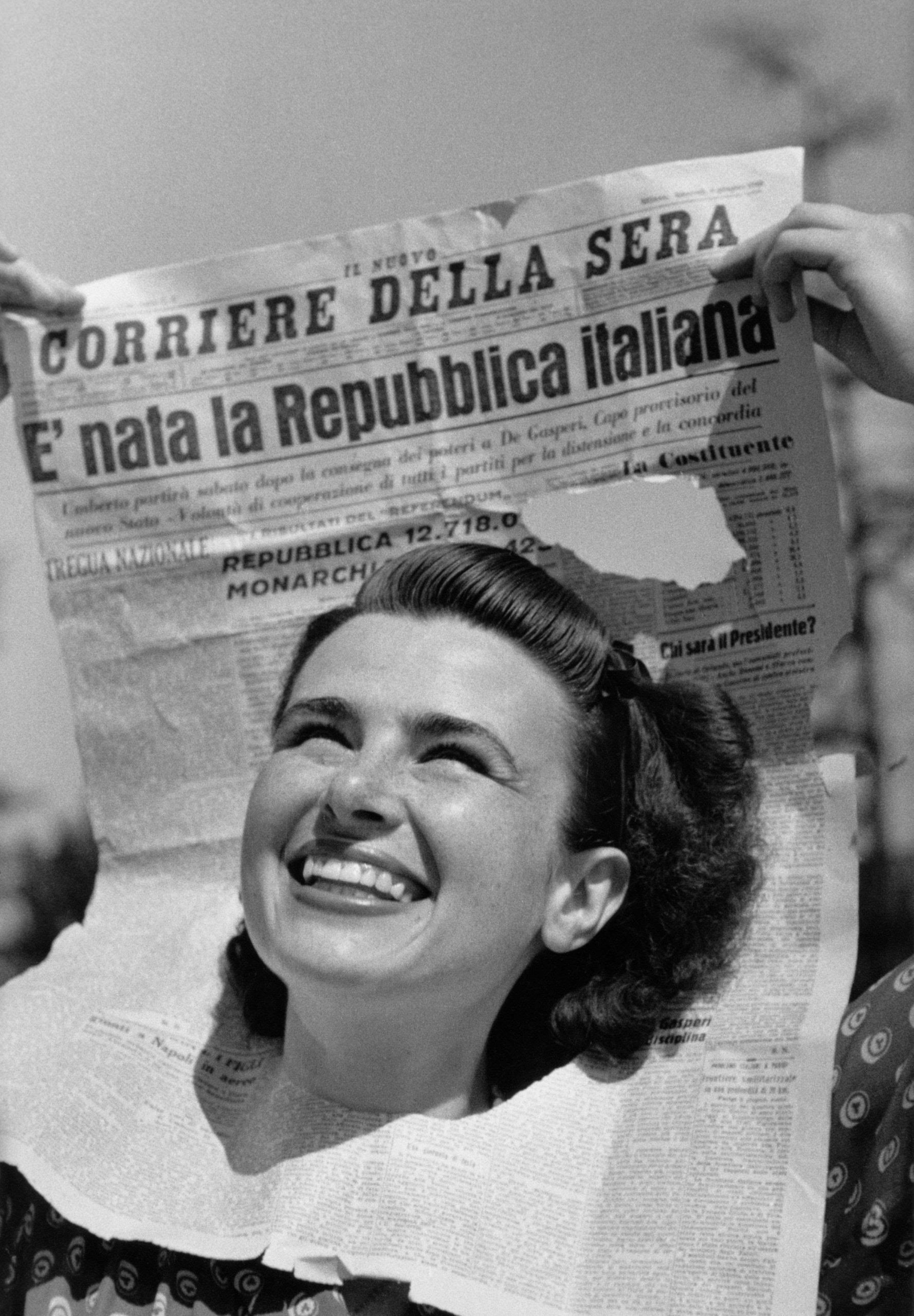
The symbolic photo of the birth of the Republic, which portrays the face of a young woman emerging from a copy of Il Corriere della Sera of 6 June 1946 with the title «È nata la Repubblica Italiana» ("The Italian Republic is born")

The photo, which later became a "symbol" of the celebrations for the outcome of the referendum, portrays the face of a young woman emerging from a copy of Il Corriere della Sera of 6 June 1946 with the title «È nata la Repubblica Italiana» ("The Italian Republic is born").

The symbolic photo of the birth of the Republic was taken by Federico Patellani for the weekly Tempo (n. 22, 15–22 June 1946) as part of a photo shoot celebrating the Republic and the new role of women; it was also featured on the front page of the Il Corriere della Sera itself and was later reused in many campaigns and posters.

Only in 2016 was the woman identified as Anna Iberti (1922–1997).

== Celebration ==
The official ceremony of the Rome celebration includes the solemn flag-raising ceremony at the Altare della Patria and the tribute to the Italian Unknown Soldier with the deposition of a laurel wreath by the President of the Italian Republic in the presence of the most important officers of the State, or of the President of the Senate, the President of the Chamber of Deputies, the President of the Council of Ministers, the President of the Constitutional Court, the Minister of Defense and the Chief of Defense. After the playing of the National Anthem Il Canto degli Italiani, the Frecce Tricolori cross the skies of Rome.

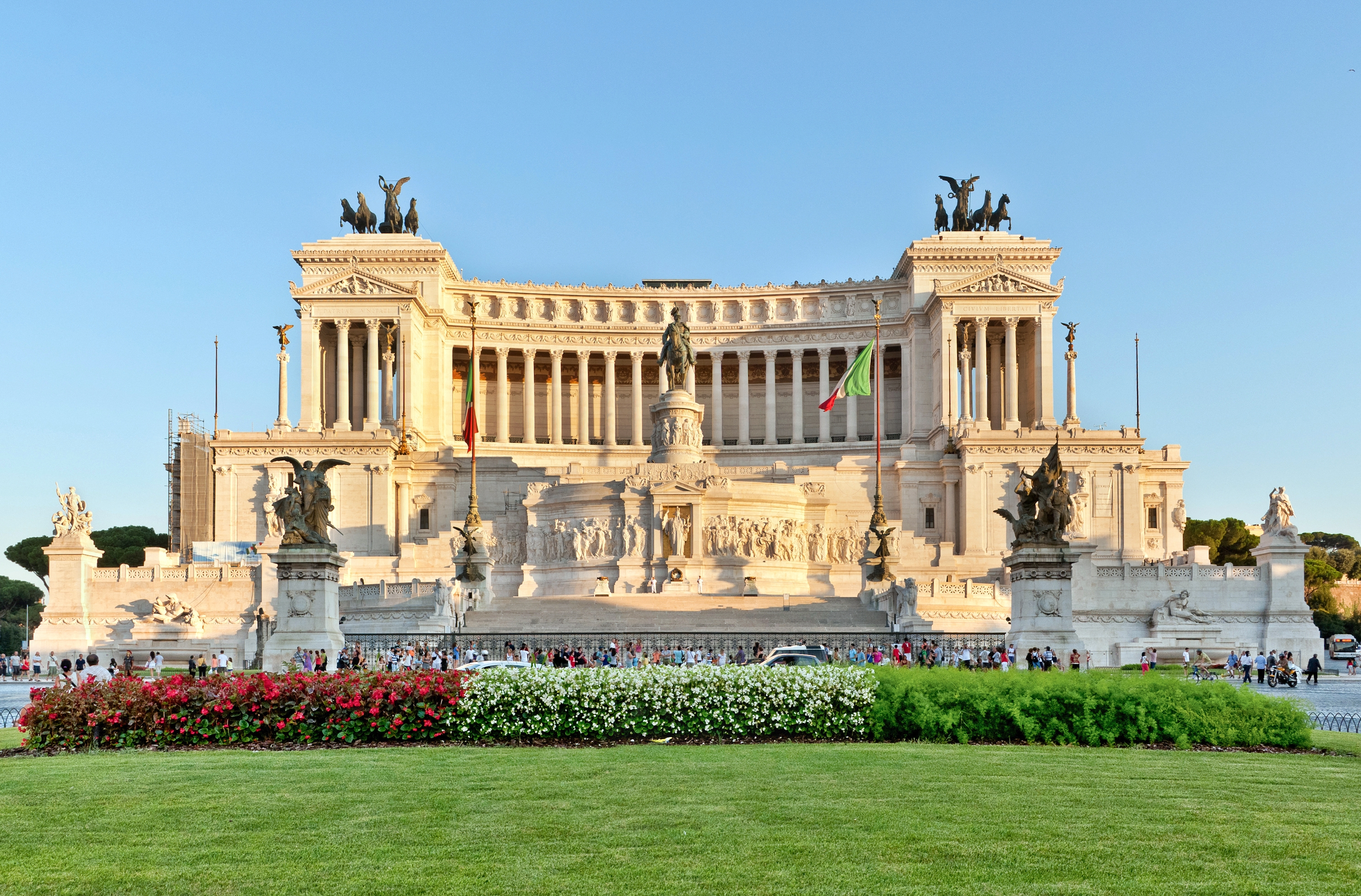
Altare della Patria (Altar of the Fatherland), also known as "Vittoriano", where the celebrations start

Following the ceremony the President is then driven to Via di San Gregorio with the presidential Lancia Flaminia escorted by a patrol group of Corazzieri on a motorcycle where, together with the military commander of the capital garrison, usually a Major General, he reviews the parade formations presenting arms as the bands play their service or inspection marches. The Head of State then processes to the presidential tribune which is located in Via dei Fori Imperiali, gets down the vehicle, and processes there to meet other dignitaries and as he arrives in his spot in the dais the Corazzieri's mounted troopers, which had provided the rear escort during the review phrase, salute the President as the anthem is played. It is tradition, for the members of the Italian government and for the presidents of the two chambers of parliament, to have pinned on the jacket, during the whole ceremony, an Italian tricolor cockade. Following the anthem, the parade begins, which the ground columns of military personnel saluting the President with eyes left or right with their colours dipped as they march past the dais. Mobile column crew contingent colour guards perform the salute in a like manner.

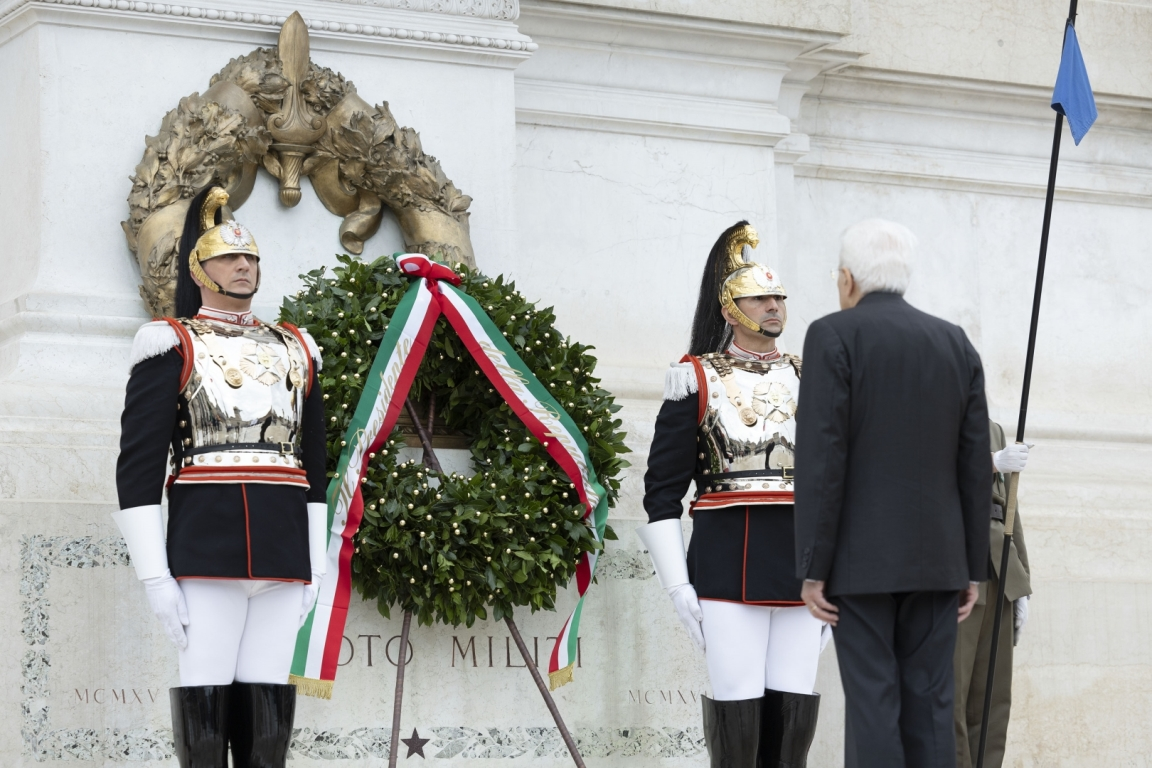
President of Italy Sergio Mattarella, escorted by the Corazzieri, pays tribute to the Italian Unknown Soldier at the Altare della Patria in Rome during the celebrations of the Festa della Repubblica on 2 June 2024.

The ceremony concludes in the afternoon with the opening to the public of the gardens of the Quirinal Palace, seat of the Presidency of the Italian Republic, and with musical performances by the bands of the Italian Army, the Italian Navy, and the Italian Air Force, of the Carabinieri, of the Polizia di Stato, of the Guardia di Finanza, of the Polizia Penitenziaria and of the State Forestry Corps.

On the feast day, at the Palazzo del Quirinale, the Changing of the Guard with the Corazzieri Regiment and the Fanfare of the Carabinieri Cavalry Regiment in high uniform is carried out in solemn form. This solemn rite is only performed on two other occasions, during the celebrations of the Tricolour Day (7 January) and the National Unity and Armed Forces Day (4 November).

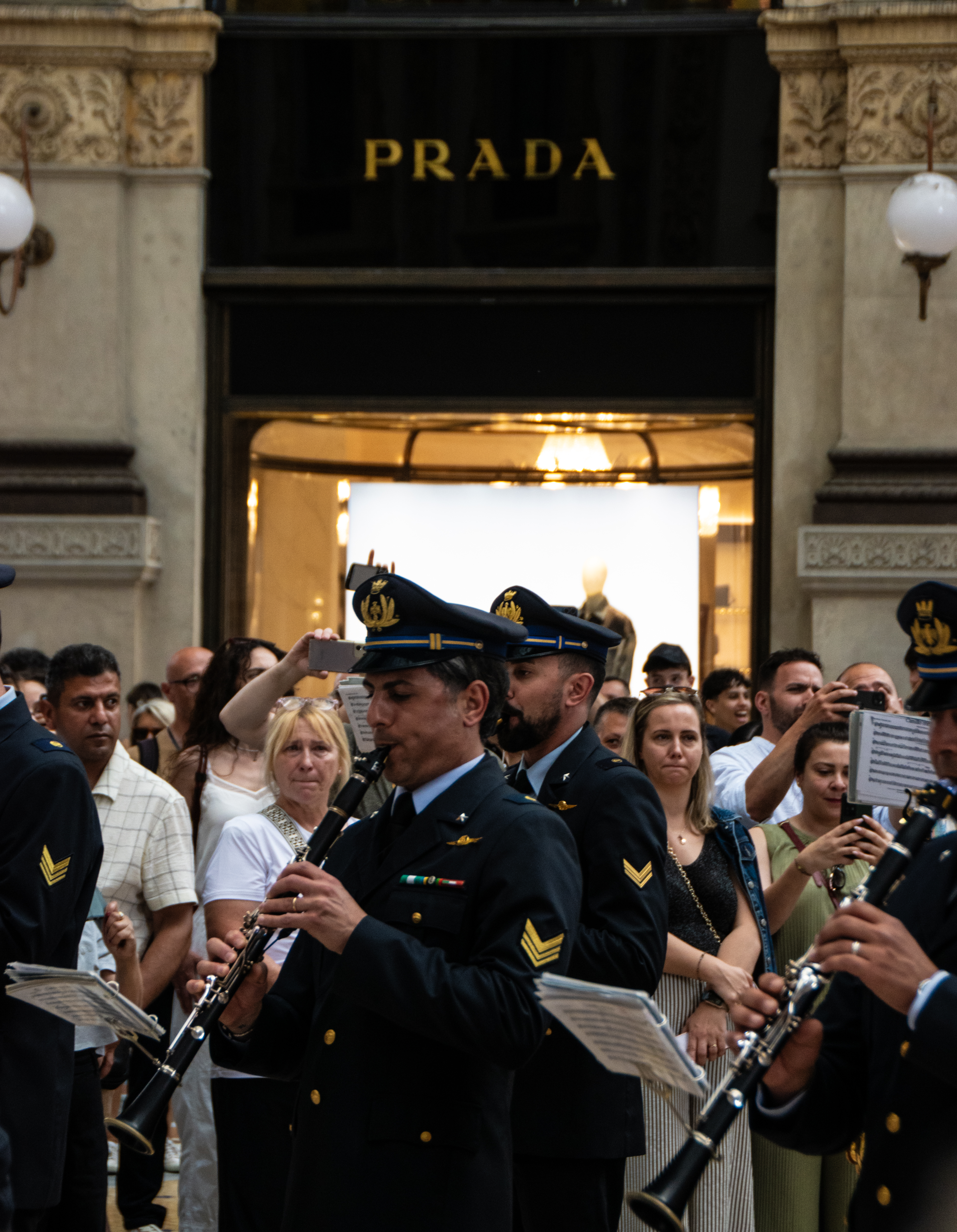
Marching band performing in the Galleria Vittorio Emanuele II, during the celebrations of the Festa della Repubblica on 2 June 2025, Milan

Official ceremonies are held throughout the national territory. Among them are the traditional receptions organized by each prefecture for the local authorities, which are preceded by solemn public demonstrations with reduced military parades that have been reviewed by the prefect in his capacity as the highest governmental authority in the province. Similar ceremonies are also organized by the Regions and Municipalities.

All over the world, Italian embassies organize ceremonies to which the Heads of State of the host country are invited. Greetings from the other Heads of State reach the President of the Italian Republic from all over the world.

== Parade ==
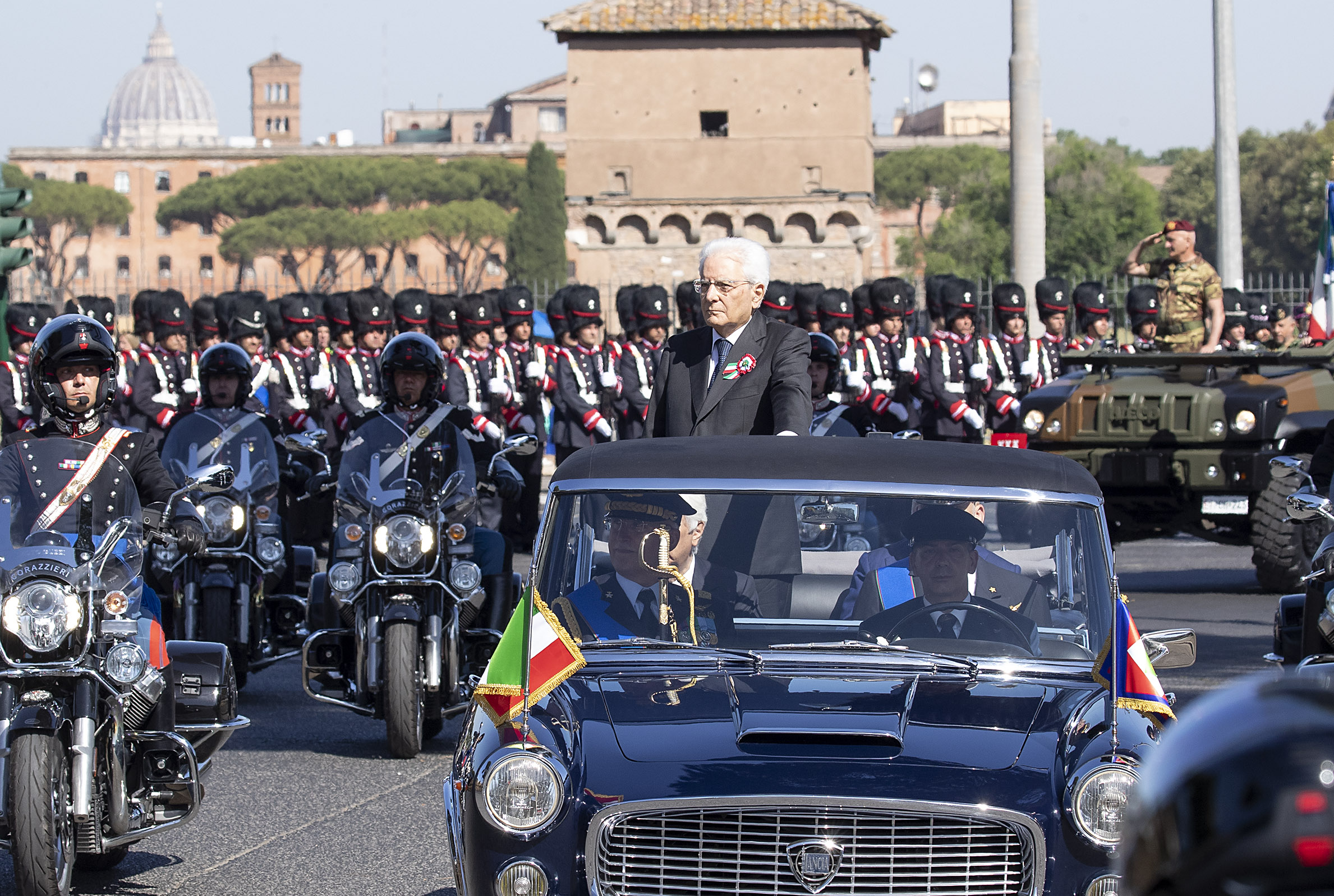
President of the Italian Republic Sergio Mattarella on the presidential car Lancia Flaminia during the 2022 parade

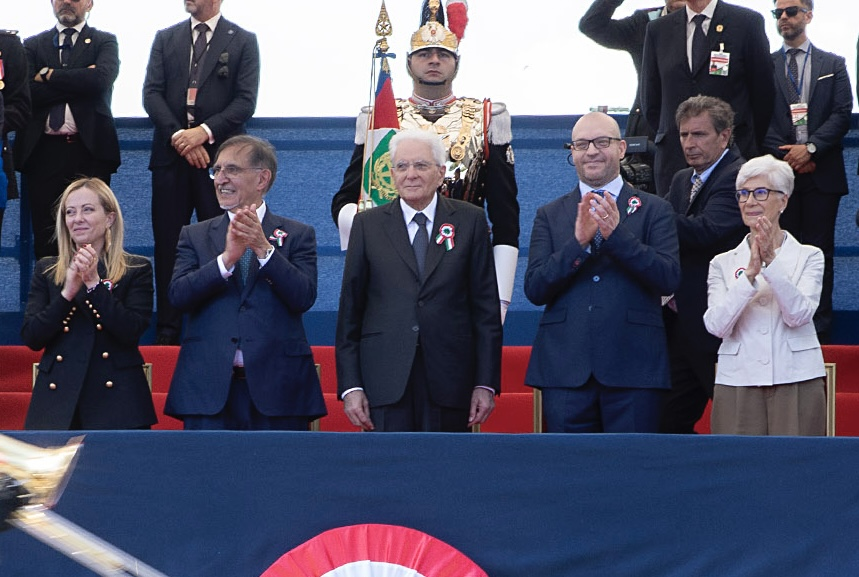
The most important offices of the Italian State have pinned on the jacket, during the military parade of the Festa della Repubblica celebrated every 2 June, a cockade of Italy.

The Italian Armed Forces, all the police forces of the Republic, the Vigili del Fuoco, the Protezione Civile and the Italian Red Cross take part in the military parade. The military parade was included for the first time in the protocol of official celebrations in 1950.

In 1976 the military parade was not organized following the disastrous earthquake of Friuli, while the following year, in 1977, in full austerity, it was decided not to resume the traditional military parade to avoid burdening further expenses on the state budget. This decision was also reiterated in the following years. Instead of the military parade, a demonstration was organized in Piazza Venezia, which was attended by representatives of the Italian armed forces.

The military parade was reinserted in the official ceremony of the main celebration of Rome in 1983; in that year the Festa della Repubblica was organized on the first Sunday of June, which was the 5th, between the Aventine and Porta San Paolo to commemorate the Resistance to the German occupation of the city of Rome during the World War II. The following year, in 1984, the parade returned to Via dei Fori Imperiali, while in 1985 it took place between Via dei Cerchi and the Baths of Caracalla. In 1989 the military parade was eliminated again; in its place, a historical exhibition was organized in Piazza di Siena in Rome. Until 1999, the celebration of the Festa della Repubblica was limited exclusively to the ceremony at the Altare della Patria.

The parade returned permanently to the ceremony in 2000 on the initiative of the then President of the Republic Carlo Azeglio Ciampi. In 2004, Carlo Azeglio Ciampi granted a special privilege to the municipal police corps of Rome, representing all the local Italian police, and the Protezione Civile personnel to take part in the parade in honour of their services to the country and their communities.

The military parade also includes some military delegations from the United Nations, NATO, the European Union and representatives of multinational departments with an Italian component. One of the most awaited parts of the celebrations, the parade is saluted by the President in his or her capacity as Commander in Chief of the Armed Forces.

=== Brief summary of the parade segment ===
As earlier stated the parade begins with the playing of the National Anthem as troopers of the Corazzieri salute the President. After the troopers march off the grandstand, the parade begins as the Central National Band of the Carabinieri marches past the dais, the first band of the parade, to herald the official arrival of the parade commander, usually a Major General of the Army, who drives past the grandstand with his motorized escort, followed by a motorized colour guard. Veterans contingents in vehicles from the Armed Forces, all police forces and the Vigili del Fuoco follow the command contingent.

The personnel are followed by the ground contingent, made up of personnel of the Armed Forces, all police forces, Civil Protection and civil service personnel. They march past the dais in a strict order of precedence with the military contingents marching past first followed by the police and civil contingents.

Festa della Repubblica Gallery
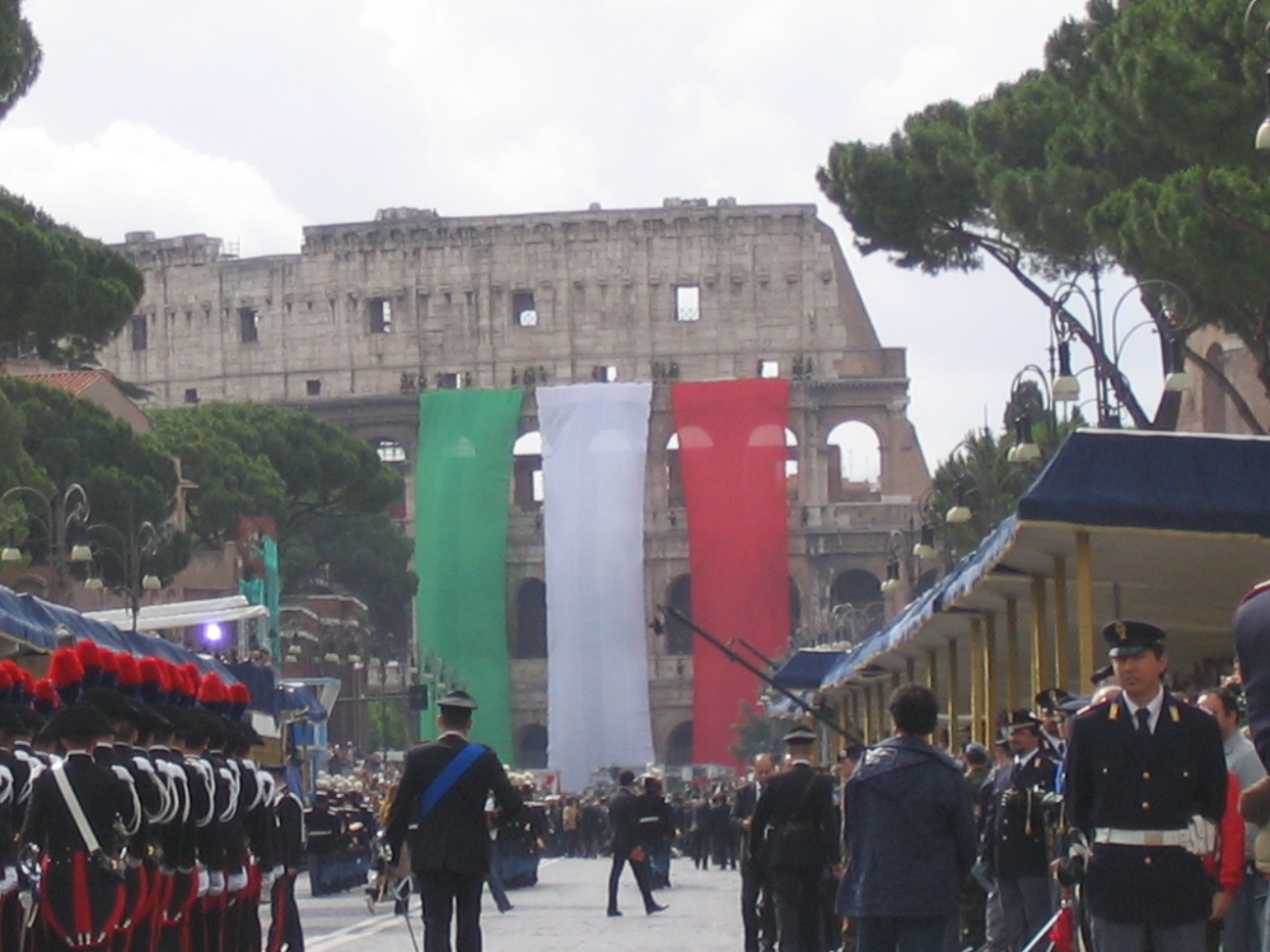
Italian colours at the Colosseum

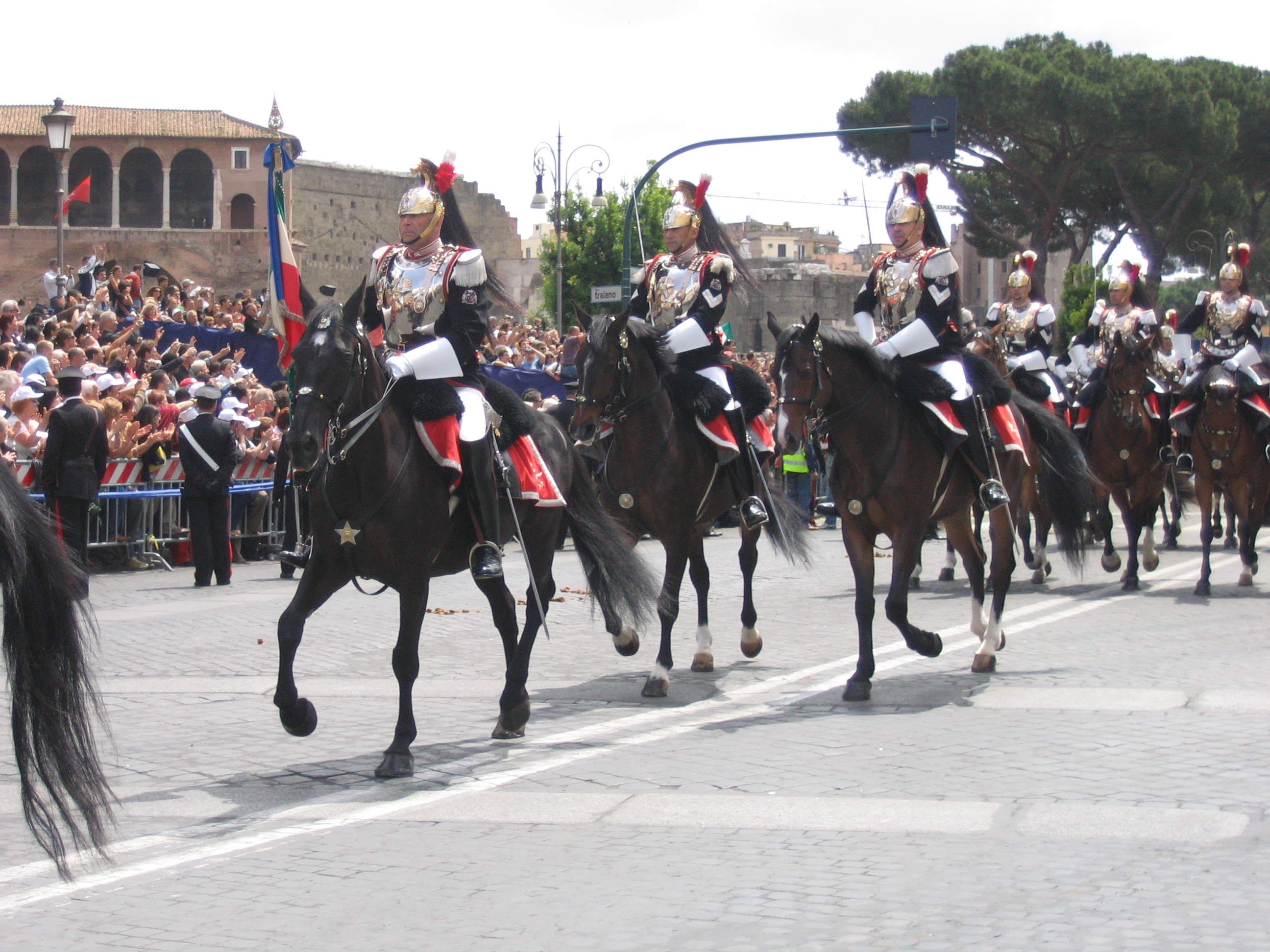
Corazzieri, the honor guard of the President of the Italian Republic

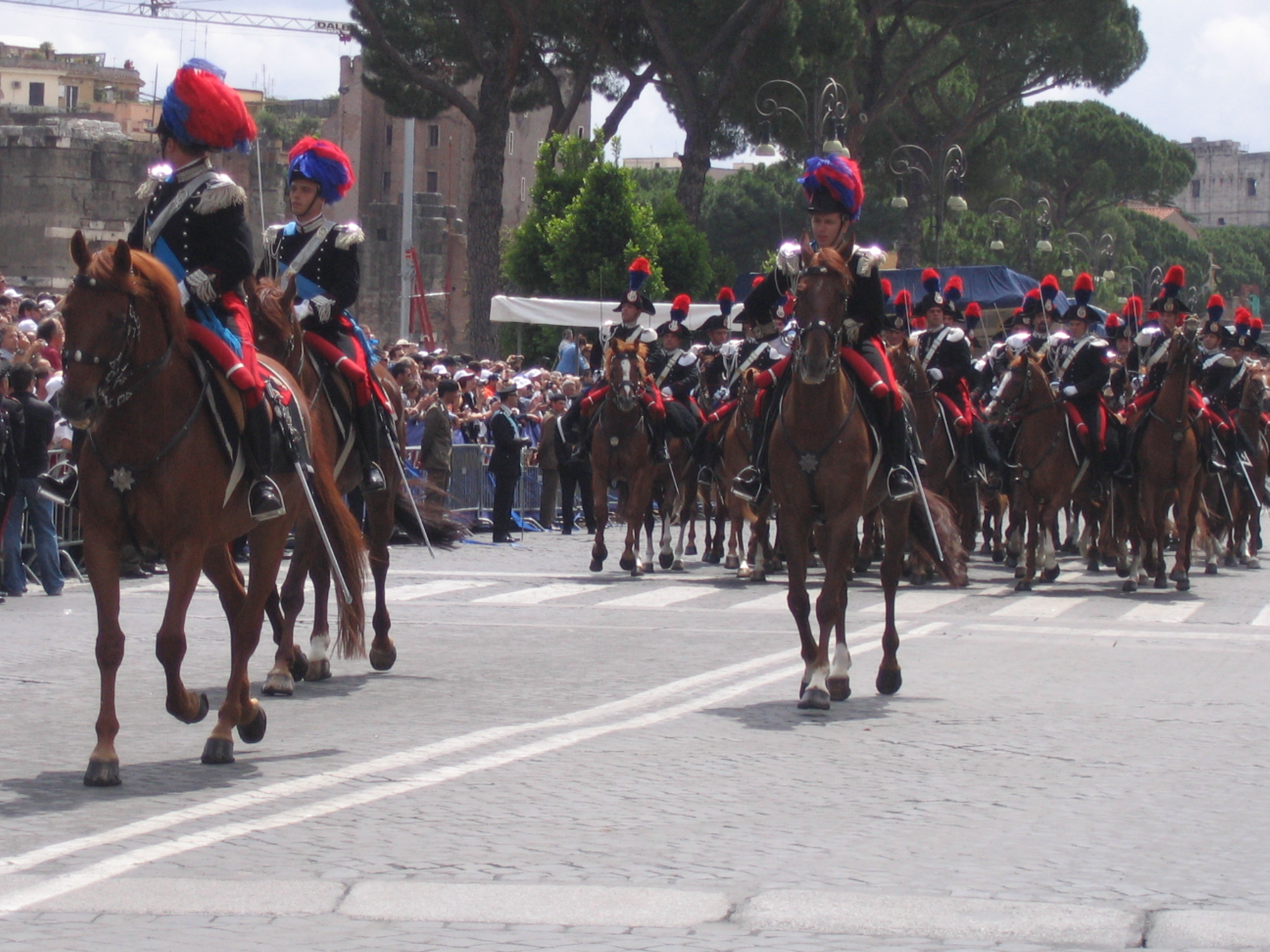
4th Carabinieri Cavalry Regiment

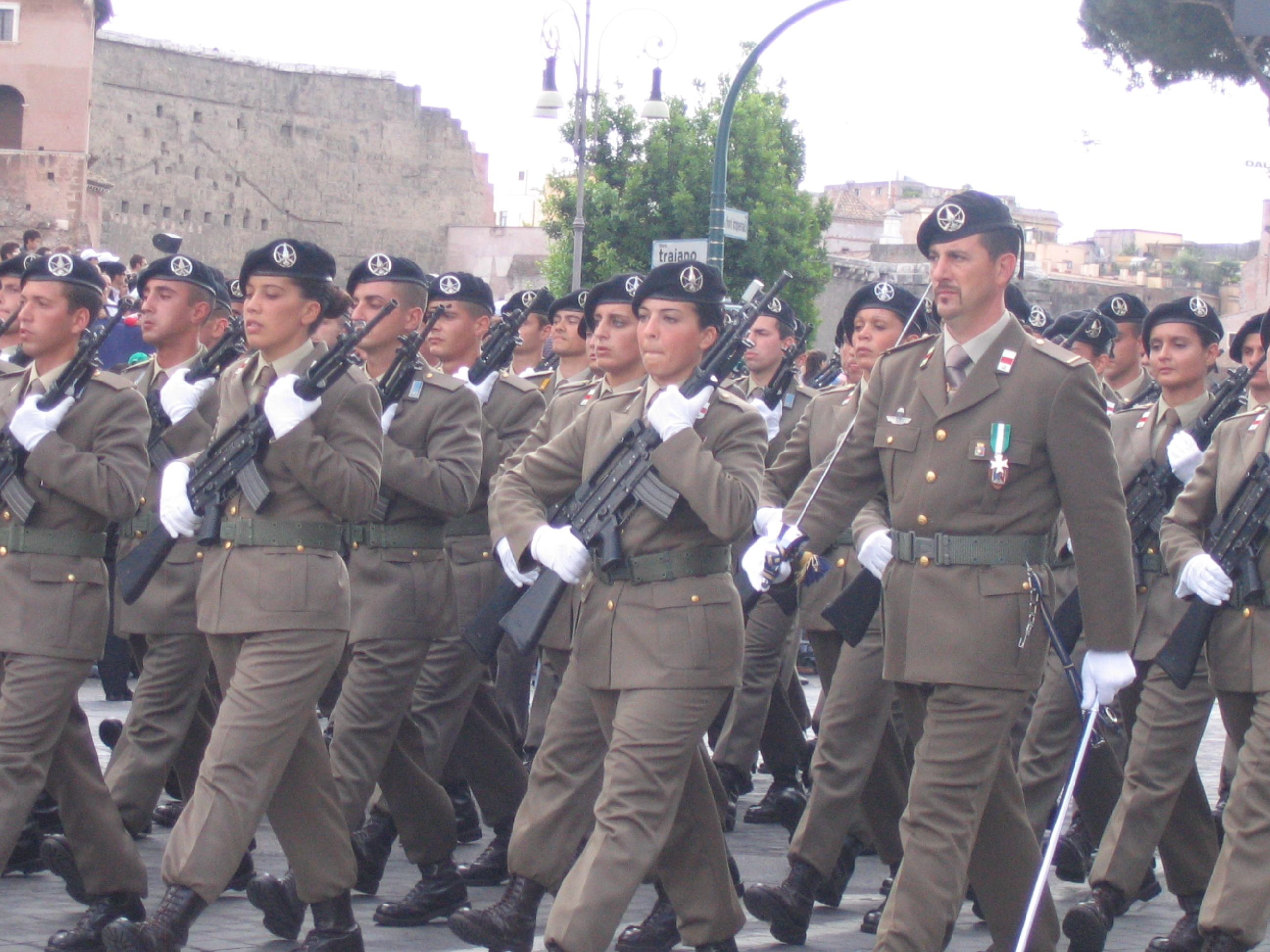
Piceno Regiment, Italian Army

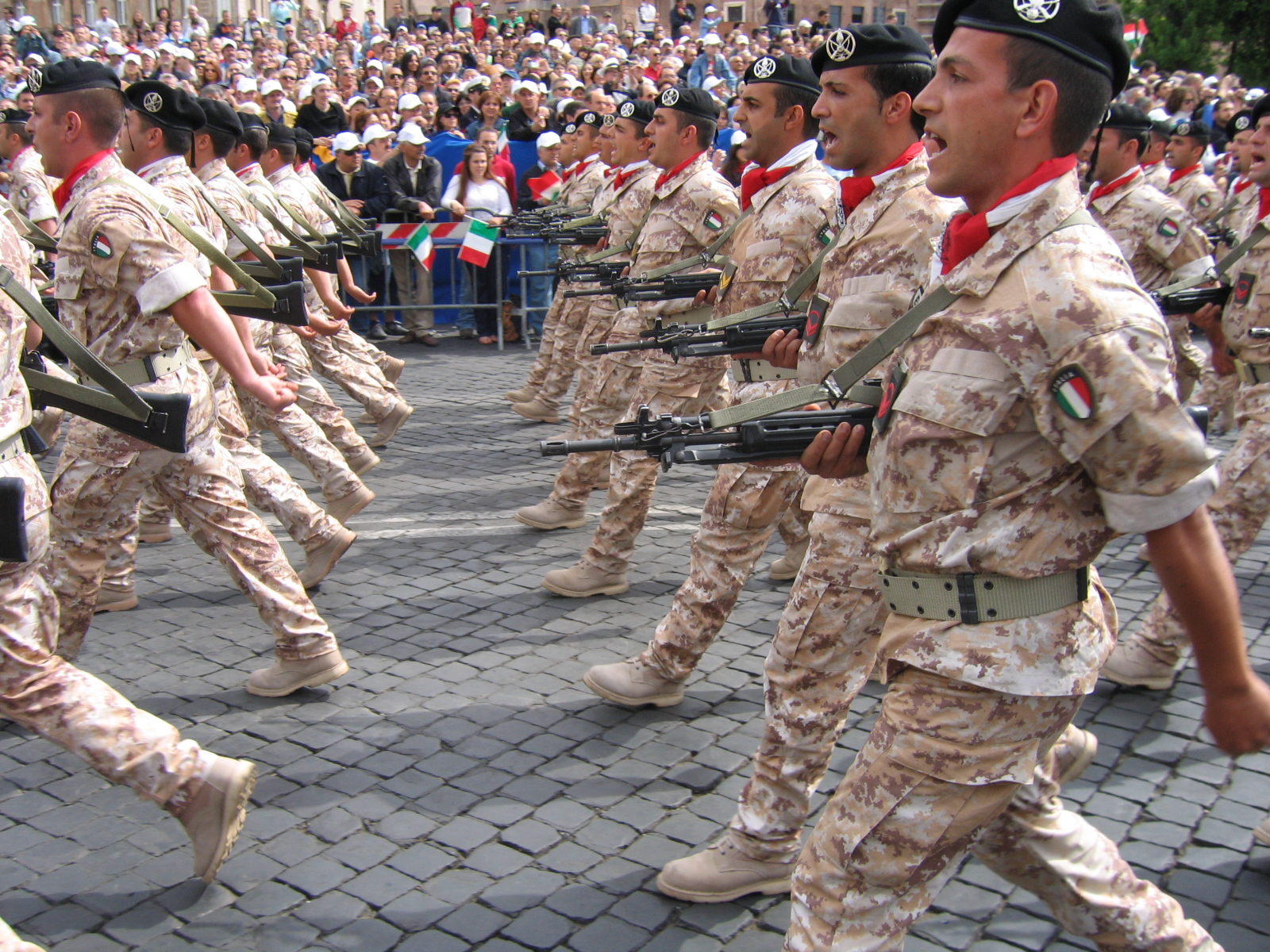
Sassari Brigade, Italian Army

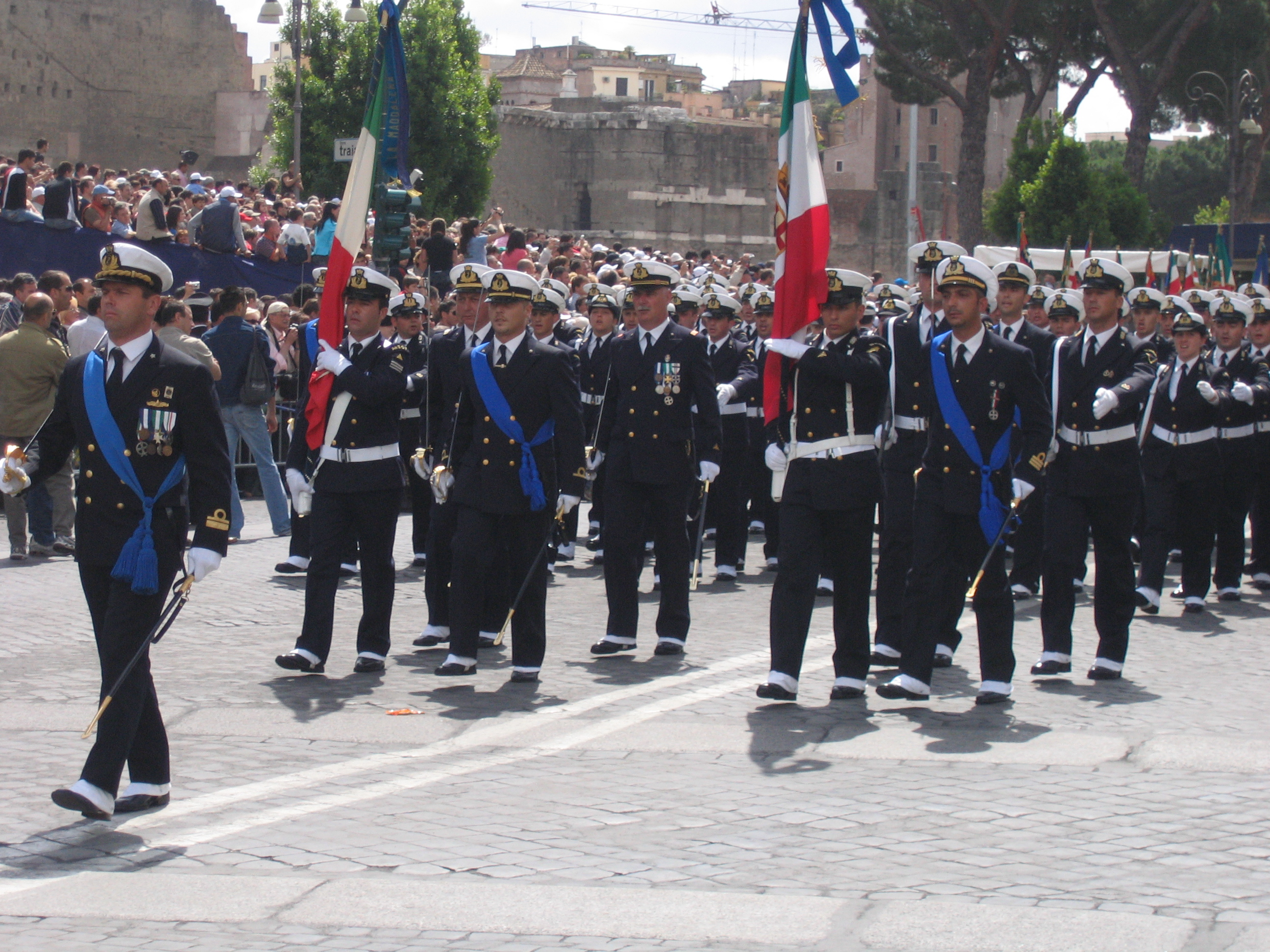
Italian Navy

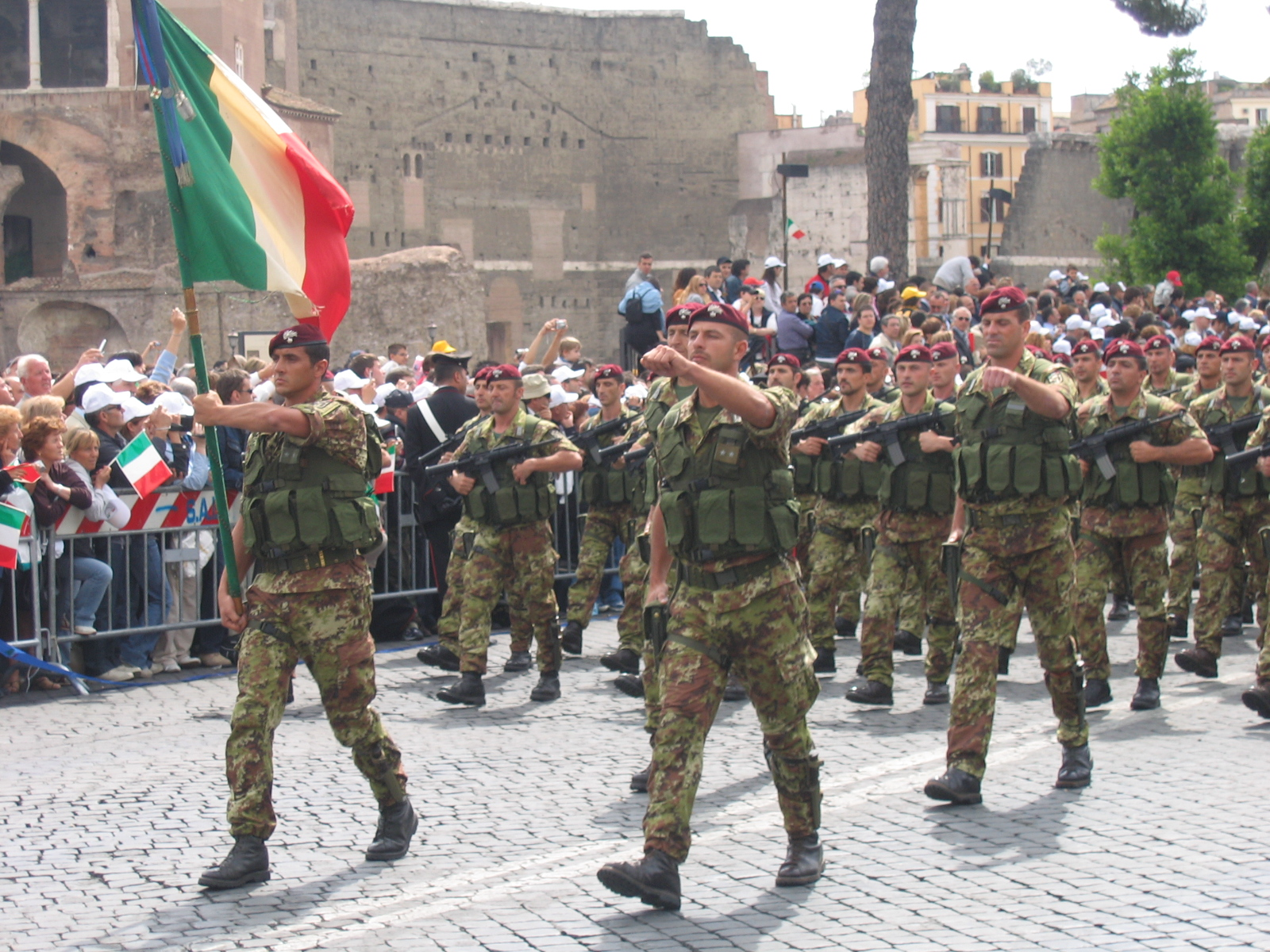
Carabinieri Regiment "Tuscania"

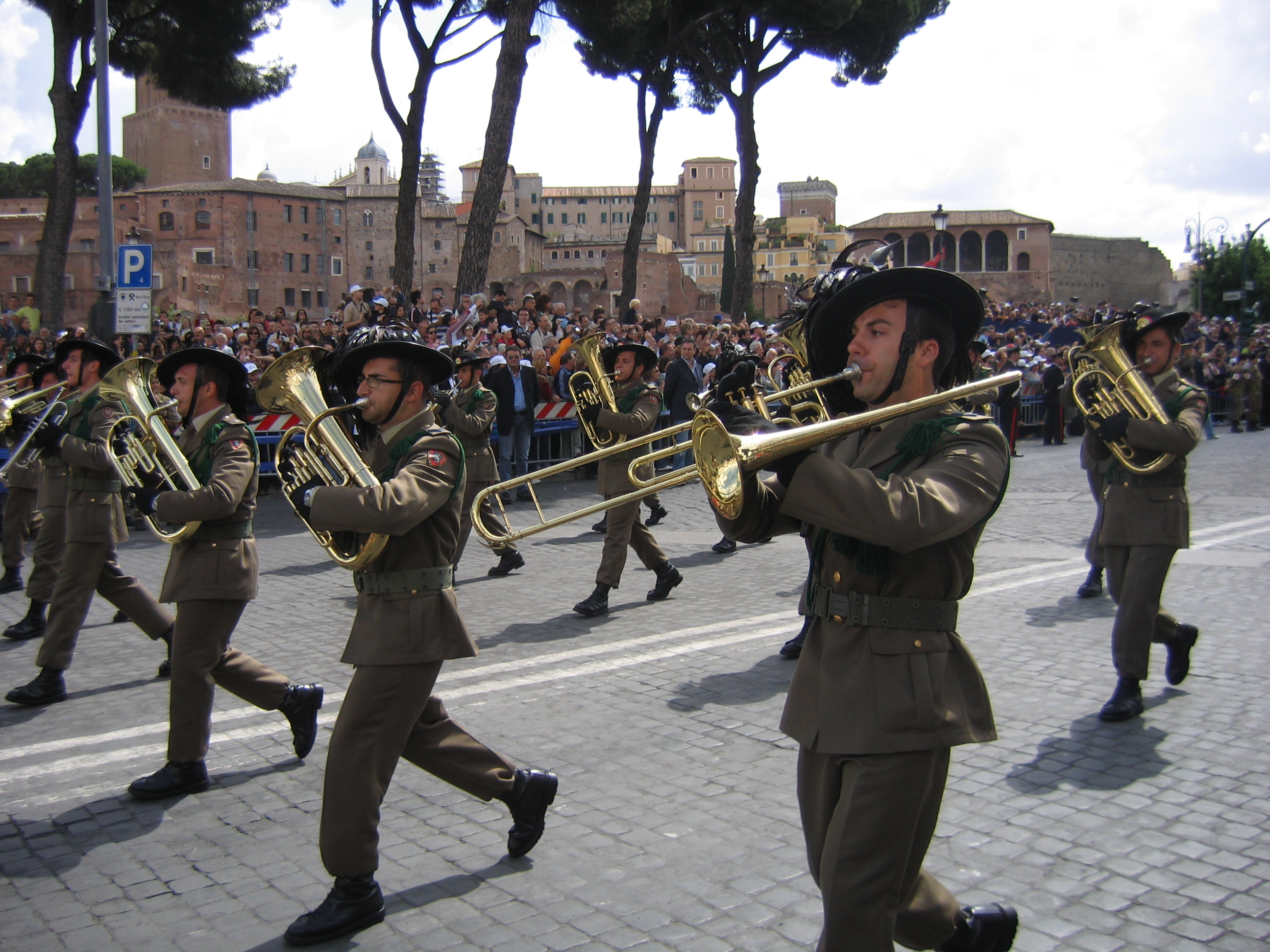
Bersaglieri Marching Band

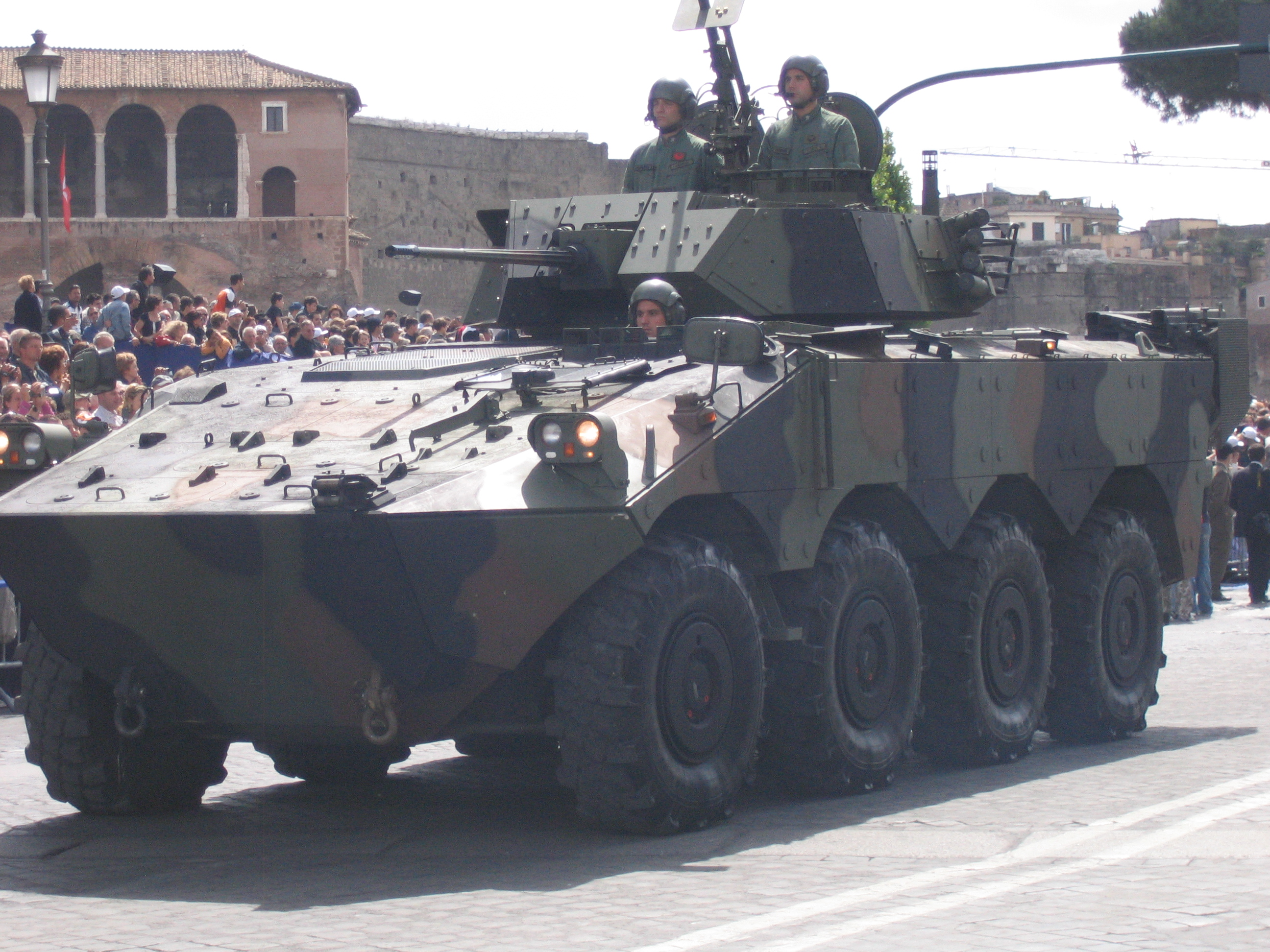
The Infantry Fighting Vehicle "Freccia", Italian Army

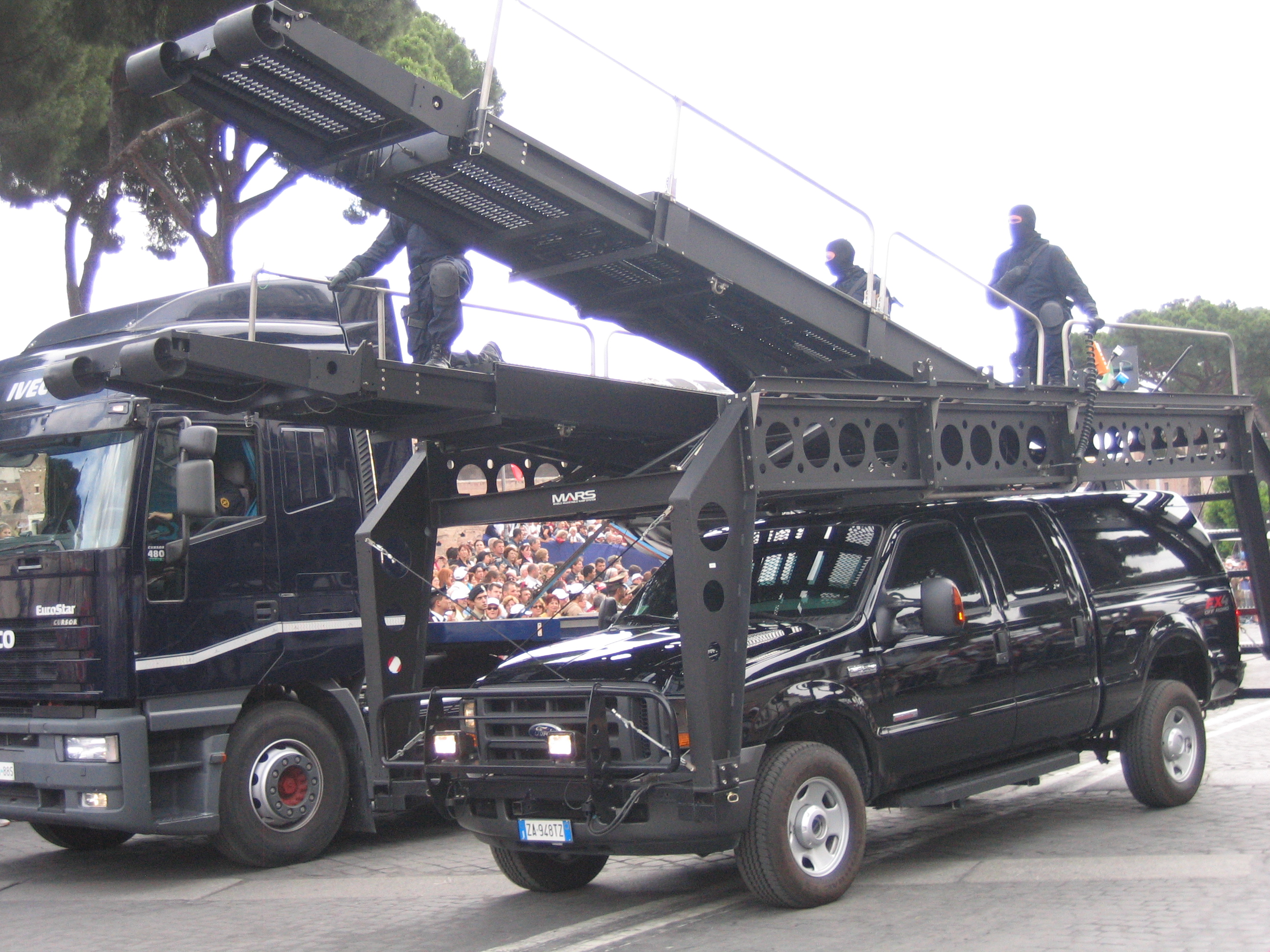
The GIS, elite Special Operations counter-terrorism tactical response unit

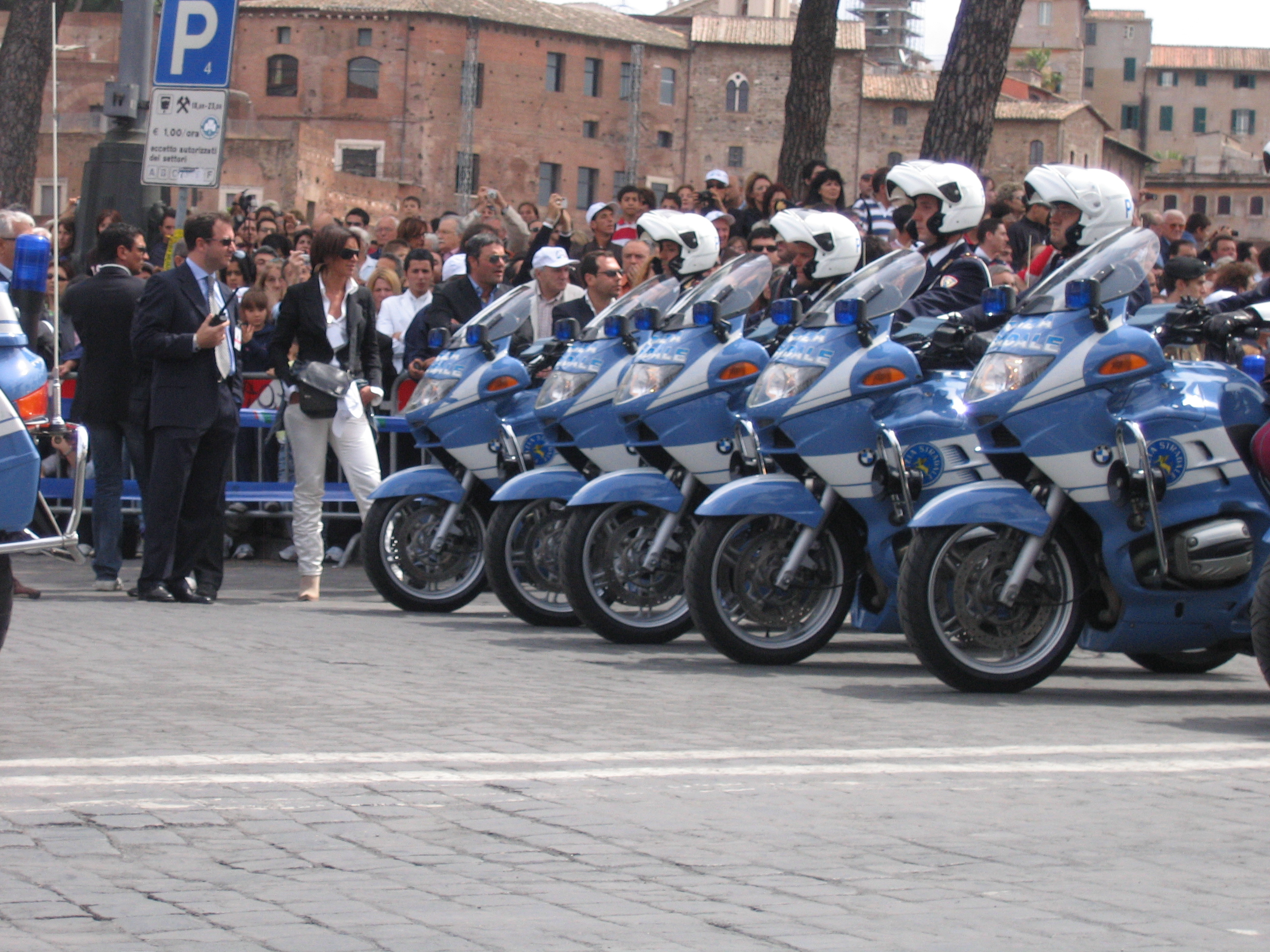
Motorcyclists of the Polizia di Stato

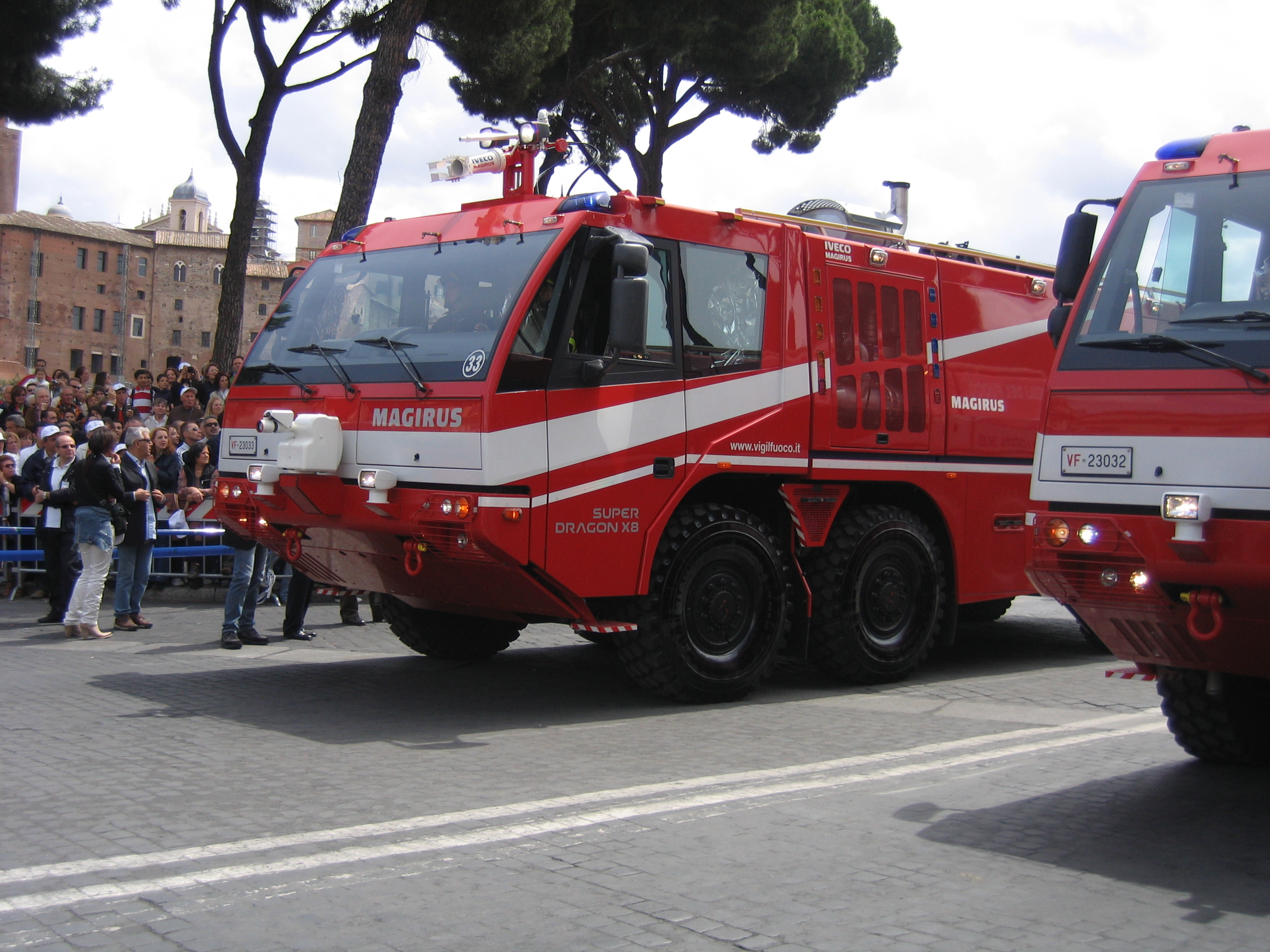
Iveco Magirus Super Dragon X8, Vigili del Fuoco

== Themes ==
Since 2000, in some years, the military parade has had a specific theme:

Year	Themes		Anniversary	President	Comments
Year	Italian	English	Anniversary	President	Comments
2000	Soldati di pace	Soldiers of peace	54th anniversary	Carlo Azeglio Ciampi	The ceremony at the Altare della Patria it was held on 2 June and two after, 4 june, the first parade of Carlo Azeglio Ciampi, who had strongly wanted the return of the parade, and last celebrated on the first Sunday of June. First military parade with specific theme
2001	-	-	55th anniversary	Carlo Azeglio Ciampi	First parade celebrated on 2 June after its reinstatement by law no. 336 of 20 November 2000 after twenty-four years of suspension
2002	-	-	56th anniversary	Carlo Azeglio Ciampi	
2003	Le forze armate nel sistema di sicurezza internazionale per il progresso pacifico e democratico dei popoli	The armed forces in the international security system for the peaceful and democratic progress of peoples	57th anniversary	Carlo Azeglio Ciampi	
2004	Le forze armate per la Patria	The Armed Forces for the Fatherland	58th anniversary	Carlo Azeglio Ciampi	
2005	-	-	59th anniversary	Carlo Azeglio Ciampi	Last military parade of Carlo Azeglio Ciampi before his courtesy resignation on 15 May 2006 to allow the installation of his successor, already elected on 15 May 2006
2006	-	-	60th anniversary	Giorgio Napolitano	First military parade of Giorgio Napolitano, held on 15 May 2006. The parade was dedicated to the sixtieth anniversary of the birth of the Italian Republic. This marked the first time the Colosseum was draped in a 2,000-square-metre Tricolour flag. This tradition was continued in subsequent years.
2007	-	-	61st anniversary	Giorgio Napolitano	
2008	La Repubblica e le Sue Forze Armate	The Republic and its Armed Forces	62nd anniversary	Giorgio Napolitano	
2009	La Repubblica e le Sue Forze Armate	The Republic and its Armed Forces	63rd anniversary	Giorgio Napolitano	The parade was dedicated to the L'Aquila earthquake victims
2010	La Repubblica e le sue forze armate impegnate in missioni di pace	The Republic and its armed forces engaged in peacekeeping	64th anniversary	Giorgio Napolitano	
2011	150º anniversario dell'Unità d'Italia	150th anniversary of the Unification of Italy	65th anniversary	Giorgio Napolitano	At the parade, beyond the historic flags of Italy, the Tricolore di Oliosi also paraded. The historic flag, which paraded on a cannon carriage, dates back to the third Italian war of independence (1866) and was heroically saved in Oliosi, now a hamlet of the municipality of Castelnuovo del Garda, from capture by Austrian troops during the battle of Custoza.
2012	Le Forze Armate al servizio del Paese	The Armed Forces at the service of the country	66th anniversary	Giorgio Napolitano	The parade was dedicated to the earthquake victims of Emilia
2013	-	-	67th anniversary	Giorgio Napolitano	The parade was dedicated to the "social question" of families and businesses in difficulty
2014	-	-	68th anniversary	Giorgio Napolitano	the parade was dedicated at the start of the semester of the Italian Presidency of the European Council. Last military parade of Giorgio Napolitano before his resignation on 14 January 2015
2015	Forze Armate: garanzia di sicurezza e difesa	Armed Forces: guarantee of security and defense	69th anniversary	Sergio Mattarella	the parade was dedicated on the centenary of the Italian victory in the Great War. The first military parade of Sergio Mattarella was held on 3 February 2015
2016	70 anni di Repubblica! L'Italia guarda al futuro	70 years of the Republic! Italy looks to the future	70th anniversary	Sergio Mattarella	The parade was dedicated to the seventieth anniversary of the birth of the Italian Republic. First parade with the mayors representing 8000 Italian municipalities
2017	-	-	71st anniversary	Sergio Mattarella	The tenor singer Andrea Bocelli sang the Italian national anthem at the conclusion of the parade, is the first time a singer sang the Il Canto degli Itliani at the parade
2018	-	-	72nd anniversary	Sergio Mattarella	First time an Italian Army paratrooper landed in front of the presidential rostrum after flying over Via dei Fori Imperiali, unfurling a 400 m^{2} Italian flag
2019	Inclusione	Inclusion	73rd anniversary	Sergio Mattarella	
2020	No themes		74th anniversary	Sergio Mattarella	Public event cancelled due to the coronavirus pandemic, after the traditional ceremony at the Altare della Patria, the celebration and speech by the President of the Republic Sergio Mattarella were held in Codogno, a municipality where the first confirmed outbreak of COVID-19 in Italy had been recorded just over three months earlier
2021	No themes		75th anniversary	Sergio Mattarella	Public event cancelled due to the coronavirus outbreak Sergio Mattarella laid a laurel wreath on the Tomb of the Unknown Soldier at the Altar of the Fatherland
2022	Insieme per la difesa della pace	Together for the defense of peace	76th anniversary	Sergio Mattarella	The military parade returns after the COVID-19 pandemic and return of the Italian Army paratrooper with the 400 m^{2} Italian flag. The operatic pop trio Il Volo sang the Italian national anthem
2023	Italiani: un patrimonio di valori per la Repubblica	Italians: a heritage of values for the Republic	77th anniversary	Sergio Mattarella	First time Italian Paralympic Committee are taking part in the military parade. The soprano opera singer Eleonora Buratto sang the Italian national anthem
2024	Al servizio del Paese	At the service of the country	78th anniversary	Sergio Mattarella	The singer Claudio Baglioni sang the Italian national anthem. Showered by heavy rain
2025	A difesa della Repubblica, al servizio del Paese	In defence of the Republic, at the service of the country	79th anniversary	Sergio Mattarella	The singer Arisa sang the Italian national anthem
2026	80 anni di Repubblica. Ottant'anni al servizio del Paese	80 years of the Republic. Eighty years of service to the country	80th anniversary	Sergio Mattarella	The parade was dedicated to the eightieth anniversary of the birth of the Italian Republic. This is the second time that tenor Andrea Bocelli has sung the national anthem, but the first time it has been sung before the parade. This is the first time that the "SÌ" (Yes) has not been mentioned at the end of the national anthem since the decision to adopt the original version and it is the first time that military chaplains participate in the parade an the Italian Army paratrooper with the 400 m2 Italian flag, it was not carried out due to strong winds

== See also ==
- 1946 Italian institutional referendum
- National symbols of Italy
- Republic Day
- Public holidays in Italy
- Anniversary of the Unification of Italy
- Anniversary of the Liberation
- National Memorial Day of the Exiles and Foibe
- National Unity and Armed Forces Day
- Tricolour Day
- International Whores' Day, also observed on 2 June

== Sources ==
- Bartolotta, Francesco (1971). Parlamenti e Governi d'Italia dal 1848 al 1970 (in Italian). Vol. I. Vito Bianco Editore. [ISBN unspecified]
- Bazzano, Nicoletta (2011). Donna Italia. L'allegoria della Penisola dall'antichità ai giorni nostri (in Italian). Angelo Colla Editore.
- Baquiast, Paul; Dupuy, Emmanuel; Ridolfi, Maurizio (2007). L'idée républicaine en Europe (xviii^{e} – xxi^{e} siècle): histoire et pensée universelle, Europe – La République universelle (in French). Vol. 1. L'Harmattan. ISBN 978-2296027954.
- Nohlen, Dieter; Stöver, Philip (2010). Elections in Europe: A data handboo. Nomos Verlagsgesellschaft Mbh & Co. ISBN 978-3-8329-5609-7.
- Dreyfus, Michel (2000). "Carlo Rosselli, les néo-socialistes et la crise du socialisme international". Matériaux pour l'histoire de notre temps (in French). 57 (57): 22–28. doi:10.3406/mat.2000.404234.
- Foro, Philippe (2006). L'Italie fasciste (in French). Éditions Armand Colin. ISBN 978-2200269944.
- Garrone, Alessandro Galante (1973). I radicali in Italia (1849-1925) (in Italian). Garzanti. [ISBN unspecified]
- Guichonnet, Paul (1975). Histoire de l'Italie (in French). Presses universitaires de France. [ISBN unspecified]
- King, Bolton (2019). The Life of Mazzini. Good Press.
- Mack Smith, Denis (1990). I Savoia re d'Italia (in Italian). Bur. ISBN 978-8817115674.
- Lyttelton, Adrian (2002). Liberal and fascist Italy, 1900–1945. Oxford University Press.
- Nobécourt, Jacques (2 June 1986). "Il y a quarante ans, l'Italie devient République". Le Monde (in French).
- Ridolfi, Maurizio (2003). Almanacco della Repubblica. Storia d'Italia attraverso le tradizioni, le istituzioni e le simbologie repubblicane (in Italian). Mondadori Bruno. ISBN 978-8842494997.
- Romeo, Rosario (2011). Vita di Cavour (in Italian). Editori Laterzi. ISBN 978-8842074915.
- Schumaker, Paul (2010). The Political Theory Reader. Hoboken: Wiley-Blackwell. ISBN 978-1405189972.
- Smyth, Howard (1948). "The Western Political Quarterly". From Fascism to the Republic (1943–1946). Vol. 1. McGaw Italy.
- Spadolini, Giovanni (1989). L'opposizione laica nell'Italia moderna (1861-1922) (in Italian). Le Monnier. ISBN 978-8800856256.
