= Maria Bergamas =

Chose the Italian Unknown Soldier

Maria Bergamas (Italian pronunciation: [maˈriːa berɡaˈmas]; 23 January 1867, Gradisca d'Isonzo – 22 December 1953) was an Italian woman who was chosen to represent all Italian mothers who had lost a son during World War I not knowing where he was buried.

== Life ==
Maria Bergamas was born on 23 January 1867 in Gradisca d'Isonzo and lived in Trieste, where she had moved in her youth, and where she resided at the outbreak of World War I.

At the time, both Gradisca d'Isonzo and Trieste were an integral part of the Austro-Hungarian Empire, so her son Antonio was drafted into the Austrian army. In 1916 Antonio defected, fled to Italy, and volunteered in the 137th Infantry Regiment of the Barletta Brigade under the name of Antonio Bontempelli, a false identity used by the Royal Italian Army to accommodate irredentists among its ranks. While leading an attack of his platoon, during a fight at the foot of Monte Cimone di Tonezza, on 16 June 1916, Antonio was killed by a barrage from a machine gun. After the battle, a note was found in his pocket in which he begged to inform the mayor of San Giovanni al Natisone, the only person aware of his real identity, of his passing. Antonio Bergamas was therefore recognized and buried, along with others who fell in battle, in the wartime cemetery of Marcesina, on the Sette Comuni plateau. However, following intense bombing, the burial site was destroyed, with Bergamas and the others who had been buried alongside him officially declared missing.

After the war, Antonio’s mother Maria was asked to choose the body of a soldier from eleven corpses of unidentified fallen servicemen, gathered from different areas of the front. On October 28, 1921, in the Basilica of Aquileia, the woman was placed in front of the eleven lined-up coffins: after examining some of the corpses, Bergamas was unable to continue and collapsed on the ground in front of the tenth corpse, lamenting the loss of her own son. The body she fell in front of was therefore chosen to be the Unknown Soldier.

The unidentified body was placed inside the Monument to the Unknown Soldier at Altare della Patria, in memory of the War’s victims. The ceremony took place on 4 November 1921.

According to the testimony of Bergamas’ daughter Anna, the woman was previously determined to choose the eighth or ninth corpses, since those were the numbers that recalled the birth and death of her son Antonio; but when she came before the coffins she felt a sense of shame, and since nothing reminded her of her son, she chose the tenth so that the corpse that would go to Rome could truly be a completely unknown soldier.

Bergamas died in Trieste on 22 December 1953. The following year, on 3 November 1954, her body was exhumed and buried in the war cemetery of Aquileia behind the basilica, near the bodies of the other 10 unknown soldiers.

== See also ==
- Edward F. Younger, the American soldier who chose the body of unknown soldier of United States of America.
- Tomb of the Unknown Soldier (Italy)
