= Tomb of the Unknown Soldier (Italy) =

War memorial in Rome, Italy

- Tomba del Milite Ignoto
- Italy
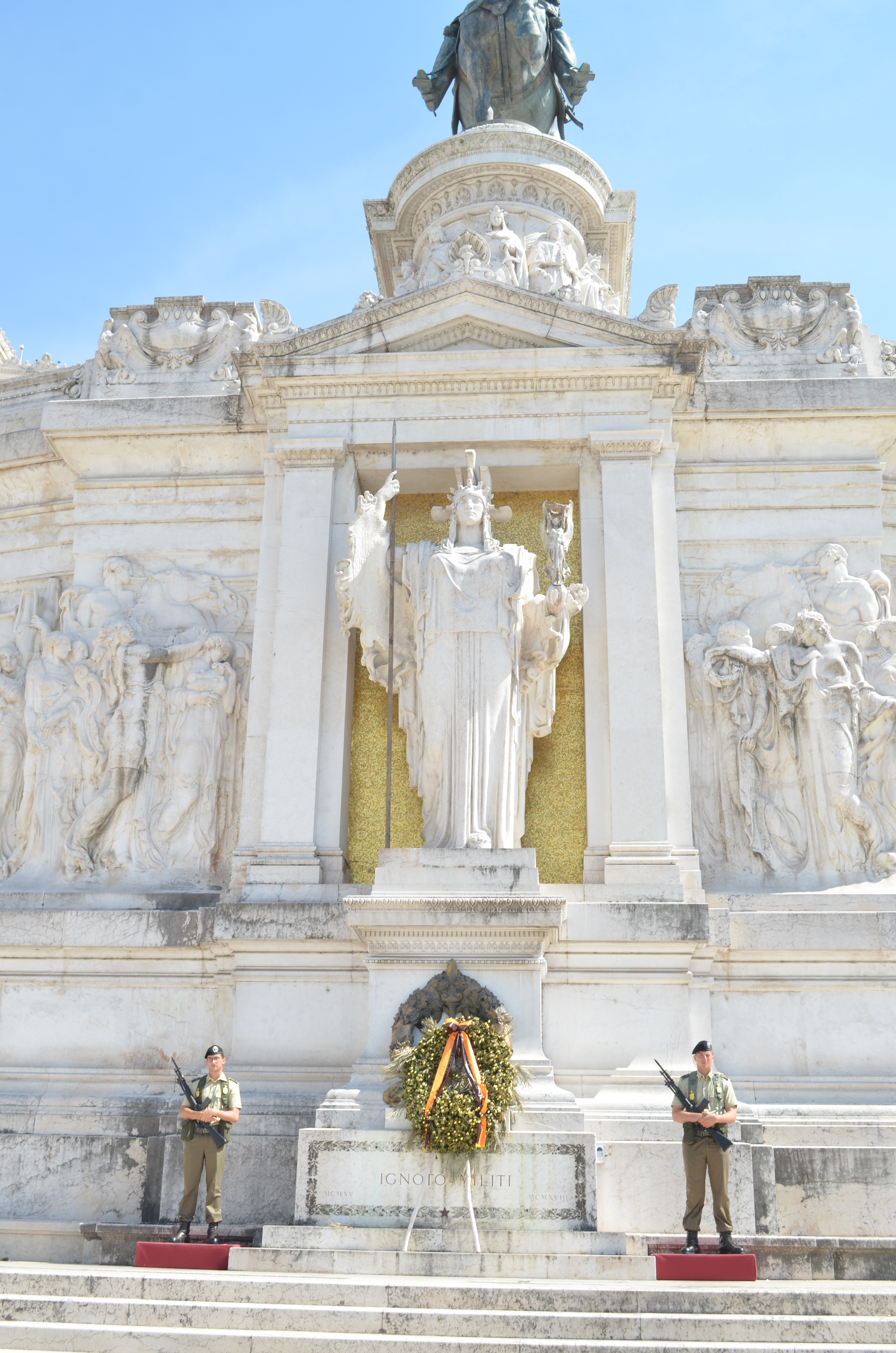
- Tomb of the Unknown Soldier, under the statue of goddess Roma, at Altare della Patria, Rome. Above it can be seen the equestrian statue of Victor Emmanuel II of Savoy, the first king of a unified Italy
- For Italians who died and were missing in war
- Unveiled: November 4, 1921
- Location: Altare della Patria, Rome
- Designed by: Angelo Zanelli
- "Milite ignoto" – "Xxiv Maggio Mcmxv" – "Iv Novembre Mcmxviii"

The Tomb of the Unknown Soldier (Italian: Tomba del Milite Ignoto) is a war memorial located in Rome under the statue of the goddess Roma at the Altare della Patria. It is a sacellum dedicated to the Italian soldiers killed and missing during war.

It is the scene of official ceremonies that take place annually on the occasion of the Italian Liberation Day (April 25), the Italian Republic Day (June 2) and the National Unity and Armed Forces Day (November 4), during which the President of the Italian Republic and the highest offices of the State pay homage to the shrine of the Unknown Soldier with the deposition of a laurel wreath in memory of the fallen and missing Italians in the wars.

== History ==
=== Choice of the body ===
The body of the Italian unknown soldier was chosen on 28 October 1921 in the Basilica of Aquileia by Maria Bergamas, the mother of Antonio Bergamas, an Italian irredentist volunteer in the Royal Italian Army whose body was not recovered during World War I. Maria Bergamas chose the body from among 11 unidentified bodies of members of the Italian Armed Forces whose remains had been retrieved from various areas of the front.

Maria Bergamas, after passing in front of the first few coffins, slumped to the ground in front of the tenth coffin and screamed her son's name: this was the chosen body. The other ten bodies remaining in Aquileia were buried in the military cemetery.

The chosen body made a journey from Aquileia to Rome by train, passing through Udine, Treviso, Venice, Padua, Rovigo, Ferrara, Bologna, Pistoia, Prato, Florence, Arezzo, Chiusi and Orvieto, at a moderate speed, in each station the population could honour the Unknown Soldier.

=== Burial ===
The body was buried on November 4, 1921, at the Altare della Patria in Rome under the statue of the goddess Roma with a solemn ceremony, at which King Victor Emmanuel III was present as well as many veterans and war widows. The body was initially transported by some soldiers to the Basilica of St. Mary of the Angels and the Martyrs before being transferred, through a procession, to the Altare della Patria.

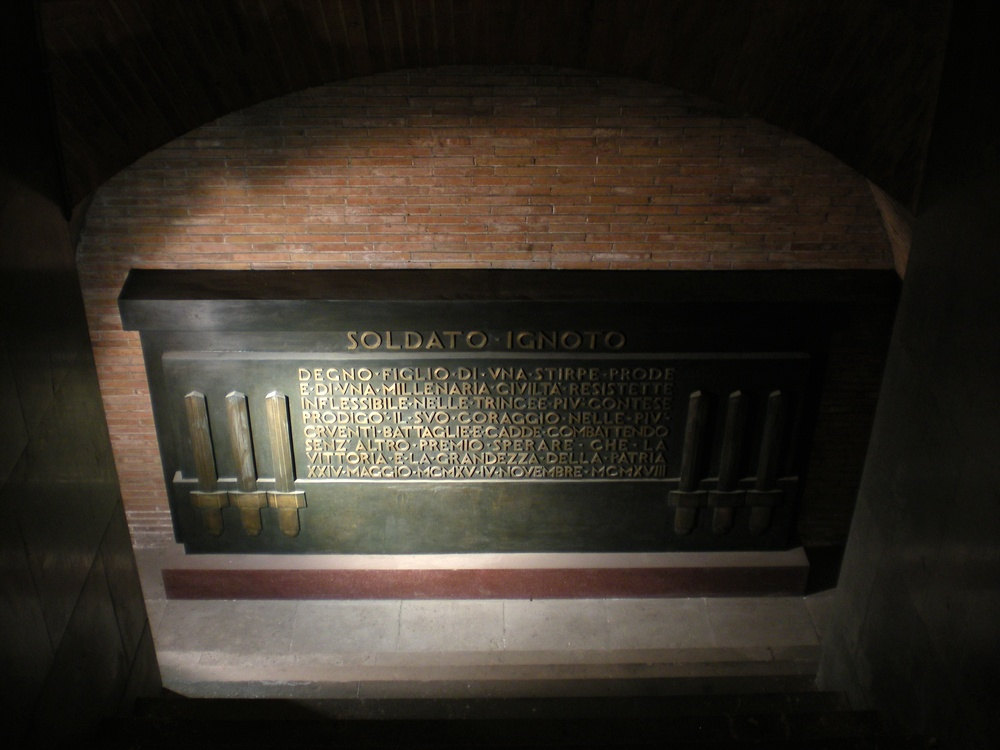
The Tomb of the Unknown Soldier visible from the internal crypt

The epigraph on the tomb at the Altare della Patria shows "Milite ignoto" and dates "Xxiv Maggio Mcmxv" (24 May 1915) and "Iv Novembre Mcmxviii" (4 November 1918), or the beginning and end of Italian participation in the First World War. The burial ceremony of the Unknown Soldier, which took place on November 4, 1921, was the most important and participatory patriotic demonstration of united Italy, given that a million people participated.

On November 1, on the initiative of deputy Giovanni Giuriati, to the Unknown Soldier was awarded Gold Medal of Military Valour, the highest Italian military decoration, with a motivation that was later also reported on the side of his sacellum which located inside the Altare della Patria, in the homonymous crypt:

Worthy son of a brave lineage and of a millennial civilization, he resisted inflexible in the most contended trenches, lavished his courage in the bloodiest battles and fell fighting without other hope than the victory and greatness of the Fatherland (Note: Degno figlio di una stirpe prode e di una millenaria civiltà, resistette inflessibile nelle trincee più contese, prodigò il suo coraggio nelle più cruente battaglie e cadde combattendo senz'altro premio sperare che la vittoria e la grandezza della Patria)

On the front door of the internal crypt is present this epitaph, which was written by King Victor Emmanuel III:

Unknown the name – its spirit dazzles – wherever Italy is – with a voice of tears and pride – they say – innumerable mothers: – it is my son (Note: Ignoto il nome – folgora il suo spirito – dovunque è l'Italia – con voce di pianto e d'orgoglio – dicono – innumeri madri: – è mio figlio)

In October 1921, the Unknown Soldier was awarded the American Medal of Honor by a special act of the US Congress.

=== Tomb ===
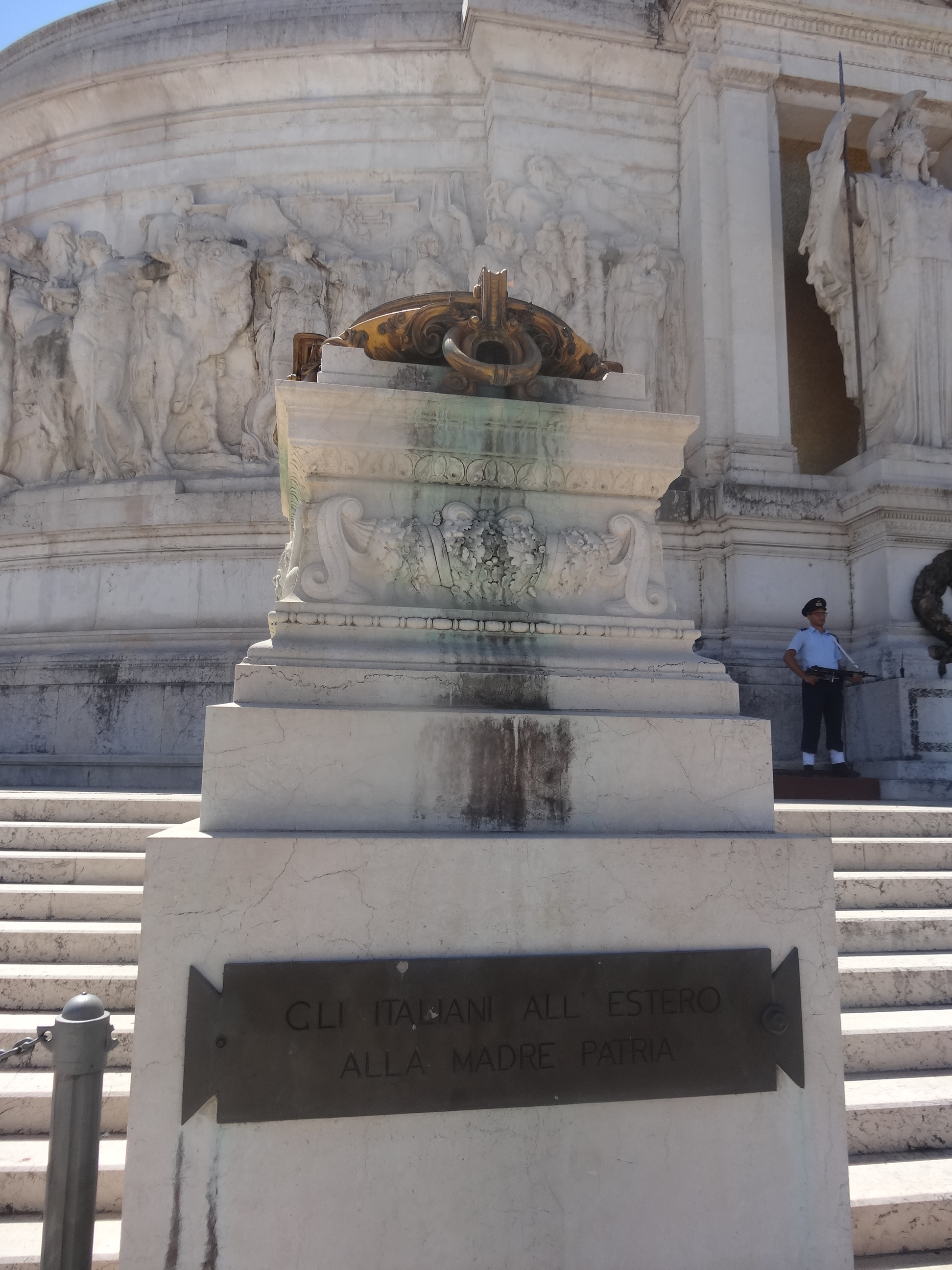
One of the two braziers that burn perpetually on the sides of the tomb of the Italian Unknown Soldier at Altare della Patria in Rome. At their base there is a plaque bearing the inscription "Gli italiani all'estero alla Madre Patria" ("Italians abroad to the Motherland")

Parts of the crypt and the sepulchre were made with stone materials from the mountains that were the scene of the battles of the First World War: the marble floor is from the Karst Plateau while the small altar was made of a single block of stone from Monte Grappa.

The tomb of the Unknown Soldier is always guarded by soldiers. The guard is provided with military personnel of the various branches of the Italian Armed Forces, which alternate every ten years. In 2011, from 29 October to 2 November, on the occasion of the celebrations for the 150th anniversary of the unification of Italy and of the 90th anniversary of the transfer of the body from Aquileia to Rome, there was the historical re-enactment of the journey by train of the Unknown Soldier.

It is the scene of official ceremonies that take place annually on the occasion of the Italian Liberation Day (April 25), the Italian Republic Day (June 2) and the National Unity and Armed Forces Day (November 4), during which the President of the Italian Republic and the highest offices of the State pay homage to the shrine of the Unknown Soldier with the deposition of a laurel wreath in memory of the fallen and missing Italians in the wars.

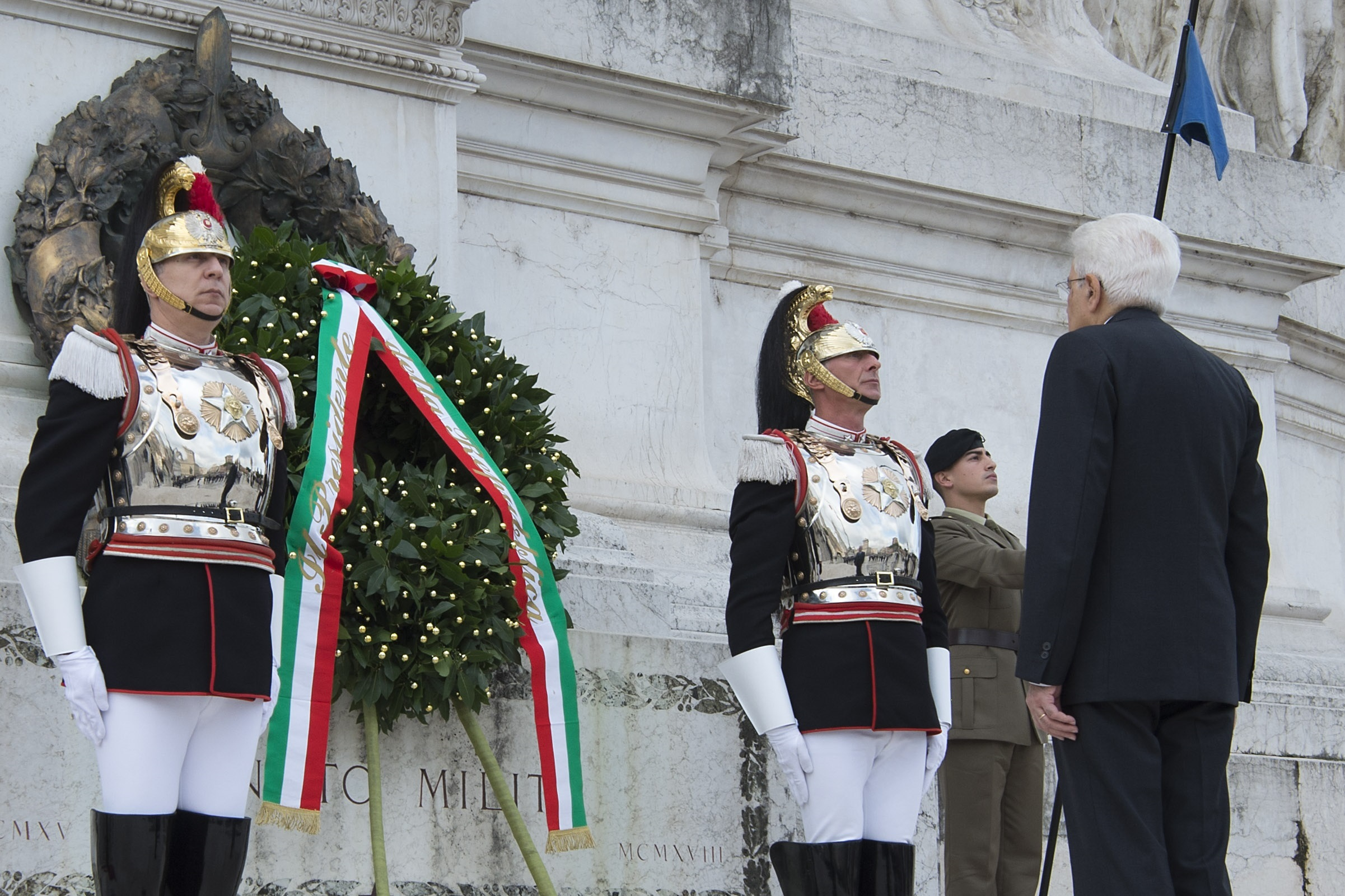
The President of the Italian Republic Sergio Mattarella, between the Corazzieri and the guard of honour, pays tribute to the Unknown Soldier (November 4, 2016)

The reason for his strong symbolism lies in the metaphorical transition from the figure of the soldier to that of the people and finally to that of the nation: this transition between increasingly broader and generic concepts is due to the indistinct traits of the non-identification of the soldier.

His tomb is a symbolic shrine that represents all the fallen and missing in the war. The side of the tomb of the Unknown Soldier that gives outward at the Altare della Patria is always guarded by a guard of honour and two flames that burn perpetually in braziers.

The allegorical meaning of the perpetually burning flames is linked to their symbolism, which is centuries old, since it has its origins in classical antiquity, especially in the cult of the dead. A fire that burns eternally symbolizes the memory, in this case of the sacrifice of the Unknown Soldier moved by patriotic love, and his everlasting memory of the Italians, even in those who are far from their country: not by chance on the two perennial braziers next to the Tomb of the Unknown Soldier a plaque is placed whose text reads "Italians Abroad to the Motherland" in memory of donations made by Italian emigrants between the end of the 19th century and the beginning of the 20th century for the construction of the Vittoriano.

== Citations ==
Preceded by Victor Emmanuel II Monument	Landmarks of Rome; Tomb of the Unknown Soldier (Italy)	Succeeded by Campo Verano
