= Edward F. Younger =

United States Army soldier

- Born: Edward F. Younger; 1898
- Died: August 6, 1942 (aged 43–44); Chicago, Illinois, U.S.
- Burial place: Arlington National Cemetery
- Spouse: Agnes Anna Younger
- Military career
- Allegiance: United States
- Branch: United States Army
- Service years: 1917 - 1922
- Rank: Sergeant
- Conflicts: World War I

Edward F. Younger (c. 1898 – August 6, 1942) was the American United States Army soldier selected to choose the body that would become the American Unknown Soldier, representing all of those who were lost by the United States during World War I.

Younger enlisted in the Army in February 1917 and took part as an infantry sergeant in major engagements, including at Chateau-Thierry, St. Mihiel, the Somme Offensive, and the Meuse-Argonne Offensive. He was wounded twice, receiving the Purple Heart, and was highly decorated for valor with the Distinguished Service Cross. He then re-enlisted in 1919 and was stationed with the 15th Infantry, Army of Occupation, Mayen, Germany, when Washington officials named him as one of six soldiers to go to France to select the Unknown Soldier.

On Memorial Day 1921, four unknowns (U.S. soldiers killed in combat who were not identifiable) were exhumed from four World War I American cemeteries in France. Younger selected the Unknown Soldier of World War I from four identical caskets at the city hall in Châlons-en-Champagne, France, on October 24, 1921. Younger selected the unknown by placing a spray of white roses on one of the caskets. He chose the third casket from the left. The chosen unknown soldier was transported to the United States aboard USS Olympia. The other remains were interred in the Meuse Argonne Cemetery, France.

For many years Younger spoke publicly about the event. In his own words, as he told the story to civic and veterans groups, in an average of one a week from the time, this is what happened:

"At first it was an idea that we (the six soldiers) were to be just pallbearers, but when we lined up in the little makeshift chapel, Major Harbold, the officer in charge of grave registrations, told us, 'One of you men is to be given the honor of selecting the body of the Unknown Soldier.' He had a large bouquet of pink and white roses in his arms. He finally handed the roses to me. I was left alone in the chapel. There were four coffins, all unnamed and unmarked. The one that I placed the roses on was the one brought home and placed in the national shrine. I walked around the coffins three times, then suddenly I stopped. What caused me to stop, I don't know, it was as though something had pulled me. I placed the roses on the coffin in front of me. I can still remember the awed feeling that I had, standing there alone."

Younger, who was from Chicago, Illinois, completed his service with the Army in 1922 then began working for the U.S. Postal Service.

Younger died of a heart attack in Chicago, Illinois, on August 6, 1942. He was interred in Section 18 of Arlington National Cemetery. National officers of the American Legion and Veterans of Foreign Wars accompanied the coffin to the cemetery.

== See also ==
- Maria Bergamas, the Italian mother that chose a body for the unknown soldier of Italy.
