= Flag of Italy =

Italian Republic
- il Tricolore
- Use: National flag
- Proportion: 2:3
- Adopted: 29 June 1797; 229 years ago (As the Cisalpine Republic); 18 June 1946; 80 years ago (founding of the Italian Republic); 14 April 2006; 20 years ago (current colour specifications)
- Design: A vertical tricolour of green, white and red
- Use: Civil flag and ensign
- Proportion: 2:3
- Adopted: 9 November 1948; 78 years ago
- Design: An Italian tricolour defaced with combined historical arms of Venice, Genoa, Pisa and Amalfi but different from that of the Italian Navy
- Use: State ensign
- Proportion: 2:3
- Adopted: 24 October 2003; 23 years ago
- Design: An Italian tricolour defaced with the Emblem of Italy
- Use: Naval ensign
- Proportion: 2:3
- Adopted: 9 November 1947; 79 years ago
- Design: An Italian tricolour defaced with the arms of the Italian Navy
- Use: War flag
- Proportion: 1:1
- Design: An Italian tricolour with a dimension ratio of 1:1
- Use: Naval jack
- Proportion: 1:1
- Design: An square flag as the banner of the arms of the Italian Navy

The national flag of Italy, often referred to as the Tricolour (il Tricolore, Italian: [il trikoˈloːre]), is a flag featuring three equally sized vertical pales of green, white and red, with the green at the hoist side, as defined by Article 12 of the Constitution of the Italian Republic. The Italian law regulates its use and display, protecting its defence and providing for the crime of insulting it; it also prescribes its teaching in Italian schools together with other national symbols of Italy.

The Italian Flag Day named Tricolour Day was established by law n. 671 of 31 December 1996, and is held every year on 7 January. This celebration commemorates the first official adoption of the tricolour as a national flag by a sovereign Italian state, the Cispadane Republic, a Napoleonic sister republic of Revolutionary France, which took place in Reggio Emilia on 7 January 1797, on the basis of the events following the French Revolution (1789–1799) which, among its ideals, advocated national self-determination. The Italian national colours appeared for the first time in Genoa on a tricolour cockade on 21 August 1789, anticipating by seven years the first green, white and red Italian military war flag, which was adopted by the Lombard Legion in Milan on 11 October 1796.

After 7 January 1797, popular support for the Italian flag grew steadily, until it became one of the most important symbols of Italian unification, which culminated on 17 March 1861 with the proclamation of the Kingdom of Italy, of which the tricolour became the national flag. Following its adoption, the tricolour became one of the most recognisable and defining features of united Italian statehood in the following two centuries of the history of Italy.

== History ==
=== The French Revolution ===
The Italian tricolour, like other tricolour flags, is inspired by the French one, introduced by the revolution in 1790 on French Navy warships, and is symbolic of the renewal perpetrated by the origins of Jacobinism. Shortly after the French revolutionary events, the ideals of social innovation began to spread widely on the basis of the advocacy of the Declaration of the Rights of Man and of the Citizen of 1789, including in Italy, and subsequently political innovation with the first patriotic ferments addressed to the national self-determination that later led to the Italian unification on the Italian Peninsula. For this reason, the French blue, white and red flag became the first reference of the Italian Jacobins and subsequently a source of inspiration for the creation of an Italian identity flag.

On 12 July 1789, two days before the storming of the Bastille, the revolutionary journalist Camille Desmoulins, while hailing the Parisian crowd to revolt, asked the protesters what colour to adopt as a symbol of the French Revolution, proposing green, a symbol of hope or the blue of the American Revolution, a symbol of freedom and democracy. The protesters replied "The green! The green! We want green cockades!" Desmoulins then seized a green leaf from the ground and pointed it to the hat as a distinctive sign of the revolutionaries. The green, in the primitive French cockade, was immediately abandoned in favour of blue and red, the ancient colours of Paris, because it was also the colour of the king's brother, Count of Artois, who became monarch after the First Restoration with the name of Charles X of France. The French tricolour cockade was then completed on 17 July 1789 with the addition of white, the colour of the House of Bourbon, in deference to King Louis XVI of France, who still ruled despite the violent revolts that raged in the country; the French monarchy was abolished on 10 August 1792.

The cockade of Italy, on which the national colours of Italy were based in 1789

The first documented use of Italian national colours is dated 21 August 1789. In the historical archives of the Republic of Genoa it is reported that eyewitnesses had seen some demonstrators hanging a red, white and green cockade on their clothes. The Italian gazettes of the time had created confusion about the facts of French Revolution, especially on the replacement of green with blue, reporting that the French tricolour was green, white and red. When the correct information on the chromatic composition of the French tricolour arrived in Italy, the Italian Jacobins decided to keep green instead of blue, because it represented nature and therefore metaphorically, also natural rights, or social equality and freedom, both principles dear to them.

The red, white and green cockade then reappeared several years later on 13–14 November 1794 worn by a group of students of the University of Bologna, led by Luigi Zamboni and Giovanni Battista De Rolandis who attempted to plot a popular riot to topple the Catholic government of Bologna, a city which was part of the Papal States at the time. Zamboni and De Rolandis defined themselves as "patriots" and wore tricolour cockades to signal they were inspired by Jacobin revolutionary ideals, but modified them also to distinguish themselves from the French cockade.

The red, white and green cockade appeared, after the events of Bologna, during Napoleon's entry into Milan, which took place on 15 May 1796. These cockades, having the typical circular shape, possessed red on the outside, green on an intermediate position, and white on the centre. These ornaments were worn by the rioters even during the religious ceremonies officiated inside the Milan Cathedral as thanks for the arrival of Napoleon, who was seen, at least initially, as a liberator. The tricolour cockades then became one of the official symbols of the Milanese National Guard, which was founded on 20 November 1796, and then spread elsewhere along the Italian Peninsula. Later the green, white and red cockade spread to a greater extent, gradually becoming the only ornament used in Italy by the rioters. The patriots began to call it "Italian cockade" making it become one of the symbols of the country. The green, white and red tricolour thus acquired a strong patriotic value, becoming one of the symbols of national awareness, a change that gradually led it to enter the collective imagination of the Italians.

=== The Napoleonic era ===
The war flag of the Lombard Legion, which was the first military unit to adopt the three Italian national colours

The oldest documented mention of the Italian tricolour flag is linked to Napoleon Bonaparte's first descent into the Italian peninsula. The first territory to be conquered by Napoleon was Piedmont; in the historical archive of the Piedmontese municipality of Cherasco is preserved a document attesting, on 13 May 1796, on the occasion of the Armistice of Cherasco between Napoleon and the Austro-Piedmontese troops, the first mention of the Italian tricolour, referring to municipal banners hoisted on three towers in the historic centre. On the document the term "green" was subsequently crossed and replaced by "blue", the colour that forms – together with white and red – the French flag.

With the start of the first campaign in Italy, in many places the Jacobins of the Italian peninsula rose up, contributing, together with the Italian soldiers framed in the Napoleonic army, to the French victories. This renewal was accepted by the Italians despite being linked to the conveniences of Napoleonic France, which had strong imperialist tendencies because the new political situation was seen as better than the previous one. This double-threaded link with France was more acceptable than the previous centuries of absolutism.

Flag of the Cispadane Republic, which was the first Italian tricolour adopted by a sovereign Italian state (1797)

On 11 October 1796, Napoleon communicated to the Directorate the birth of the Lombard Legion, a military unit constituted by the General Administration of Lombardy, a government that was headed by the Transpadane Republic (1796–1797). On this document, with reference to its war flag, which followed the French tricolour and which was proposed to Napoleon by the Milanese patriots, it is reported that this military unit would have had a red, white and green banner, colours formerly used by Milanese National Guard as well as on the cockades. In a ceremony at the Piazza del Duomo on 16 November 1796, a military flag was presented to the Lombard Legion. The Lombard Legion was therefore the first Italian military department to equip itself, as a banner, with a tricolour flag. The first official approval of the Italian flag by the authorities was therefore as a military insignia of the Lombard— Legion and not yet as the national flag of a sovereign Italian state.

With the succession of Napoleon's military victories and the consequent founding of republics favourable to revolutionary ideals, red, white and green were adopted on military banners as a symbol of social and political innovation in many Italian cities. On 19 June 1796, Bologna was occupied by Napoleon's troops. On 18 October 1796, together with the establishment of the Italian Legion (the military banner of this military unit was composed of a red, white and green tricolour, likely inspired by the similar decision of the Lombard Legion), the wire Napoleonic congregation of magistrates, and deputies of Bologna, decided to create a civic banner of red, white and green, this time released from military use. Following the adoption by the Bolognese congregation, the Italian flag became a political symbol of the struggle for the independence of Italy from foreign powers, supported by its use also in the civil sphere.

The first red, white and green national flag of a sovereign Italian state was adopted on 7 January 1797, when the Fourteenth Parliament of the Cispadane Republic (1797), on the proposal of deputy Giuseppe Compagnoni, decreed "to make universal the ... standard or flag of three colours, green, white, and red ...":

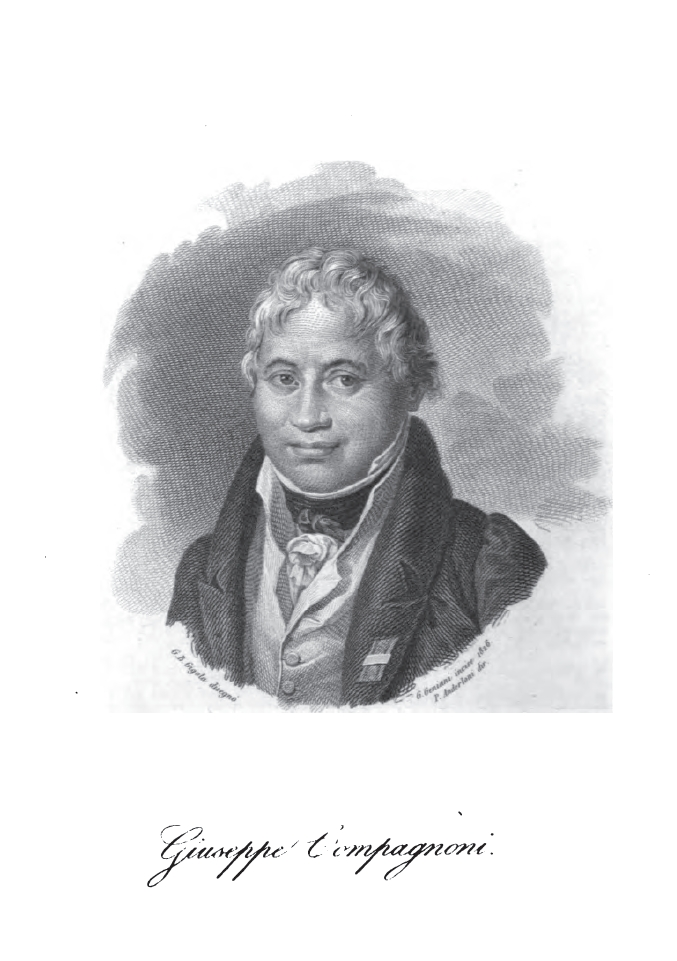
Giuseppe Compagnoni, considered the "father of the Italian flag"

[...] From the minutes of the XIV Session of the Cispadan Congress: Reggio Emilia, 7 January 1797, 11 am. Patriotic Hall. The participants are 100, deputies of the populations of Bologna, Ferrara, Modena and Reggio Emilia. Giuseppe Compagnoni also motioned that the standard or Cispadan Flag of three colours, Green, White and Red, should be rendered Universal and that these three colours should also be used in the Cispadan Cockade, which should be worn by everyone. It is decreed. [...] (Note: [...] Dal verbale della Sessione XIV del Congresso Cispadano: Reggio Emilia, 7 gennaio 1797, ore 11. Sala Patriottica. Gli intervenuti sono 100, deputati delle popolazioni di Bologna, Ferrara, Modena e Reggio Emilia. Giuseppe Compagnoni fa pure mozione che si renda Universale lo Stendardo o Bandiera Cispadana di tre colori, Verde, Bianco e Rosso e che questi tre colori si usino anche nella Coccarda Cispadana, la quale debba portarsi da tutti. Viene decretato. [...])

— Decree of adoption of the tricolour flag by the Cispadane Republic

For having proposed the green, white and red tricolour flag, Giuseppe Compagnoni is considered the "father of the Italian flag". The congress decision to adopt a green, white and red tricolour flag was then greeted by a jubilant atmosphere, such was the enthusiasm of the delegates, and by a peal of applause. The adoption of the Italian flag by a sovereign Italian state, the Cispadane Republic, was inspired by this Bolognese banner, linked to a municipal reality and therefore still having a purely local scope, and to the previous military banners of the Lombard Legion and Italian Legion. In particular, the Italian Legion was formed by soldiers coming from Emilia and Romagna. The flag of the Cispadane Republic was a horizontal square with red uppermost and, at the heart of the white fess, an emblem composed of a garland of laurel decorated with a trophy of arms and four arrows, representing the four provinces that formed the Republic. In France, due to the Revolution, the flag went from having a "dynastic" and "military" meaning to a "national" one, and this concept, still unknown in Italy, was transmitted by the French to the Italians.

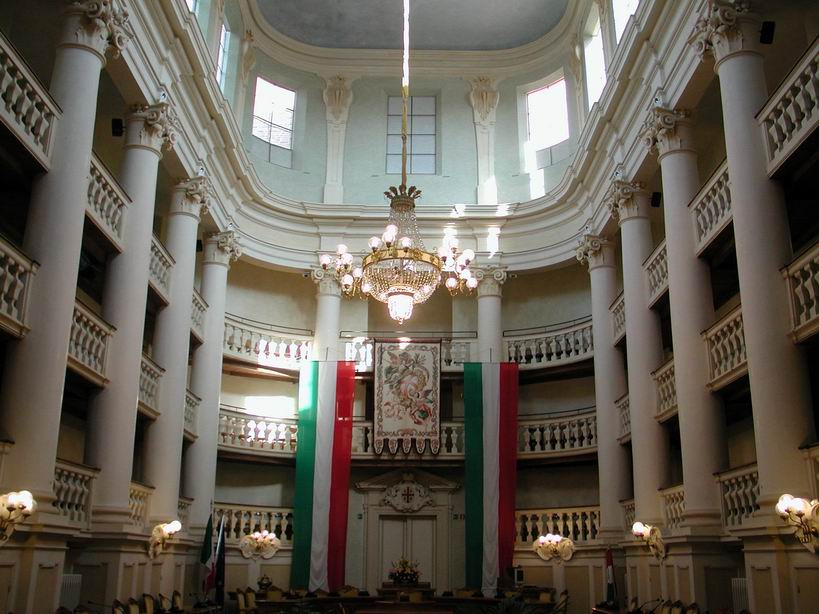
The Sala del Tricolore, which later became the council hall of the municipality of Reggio Emilia, where the Italian flag was born on 7 January 1797

The Cispadane Republic and the Transpadane Republic merged in 1797 into the Cisalpine Republic (1797–1802) and adopted the vertical square tricolour without badge in 1798. Originally the colours of the flag of the Cisalpine Republic were arranged horizontally, with green at the top, but on 11 May 1798, the Grand Council of the newborn State chose, as the national banner, an Italian tricolour with the colours arranged vertically. At the formal celebration of the birth in the new republic, which took place on 9 July in Milan, 300,000 people took part, including ordinary citizens, French soldiers and representatives of the major municipalities of the republic. The event was characterised by a riot of tricolour flags and cockades. On this occasion, Napoleon solemnly gave to the military units of the newborn republic, after having reviewed them, their tricolour banners.

The flag of the Cisalpine Republic was maintained until 1802, when it was renamed the Napoleonic Italian Republic (1802–1805), and a new flag was adopted, this time with a red field carrying a green square within a white lozenge; the presidential standard of Italy in use since 14 October 2000 was inspired by this flag.

It was during this period that the green, white and red tricolour was recognized as a symbol to represent the Italians, becoming an unequivocal symbol of Italianness. In less than 20 years, the red, white and green flag had acquired its own peculiarity from a simple flag derived from the French one, becoming very famous and known.

In 1799, the independent Republic of Lucca came under French influence and horizontally adopted the vertical green, white and red flag, with green at the top; this lasted until 1801. In 1805, Napoleon installed his sister, Elisa Bonaparte Baciocchi, as Princess of Lucca and Piombino. This affair is commemorated in the opening of Leo Tolstoy's War and Peace.

In the same year, after Napoleon had crowned himself as the first French Emperor, the Italian Republic was transformed into the first Napoleonic Kingdom of Italy (1805–1814), or Italico, under his direct rule. The flag of the Kingdom of Italy was that of the Republic in rectangular form, charged with the golden Napoleonic eagle. This remained in use until the fall of Napoleon in 1814.

=== Italian unification ===
==== The revolutions of the 19th century ====
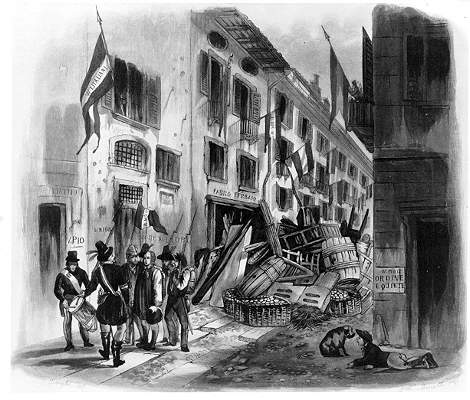
The Five Days of Milan (1848), of which one of the symbols was the tricolour

With the fall of Napoleon and the restoration of the absolutist monarchical regimes, the Italian tricolour went underground, becoming the symbol of the patriotic ferments that began to spread in Italy and the symbol which united all the efforts of the Italian people towards freedom and independence. In the Kingdom of Lombardy–Venetia, a state dependent on the Austrian Empire born after the fall of Napoleon, those who exhibited the Italian tricolour were subject to the death penalty. The Austrians' objective was in fact, quoting the textual words of Emperor Franz Joseph I of Austria:

[The tricolour was banned to] make people forget that they are Italian.

— Franz Joseph I of Austria

Between 1820 and 1861, a sequence of events led to the independence and unification of Italy (except for Veneto and the province of Mantua, Lazio, Trentino-Alto Adige and Julian March, known as Italia irredenta, which were united with the rest of Italy in 1866 after the Third Italian War of Independence, in 1870 after the capture of Rome, and in 1918 after World War I respectively); this period of Italian history is known as the Risorgimento. The Italian tricolour waved for the first time in the history of the Risorgimento on 11 March 1821 in the Cittadella of Alessandria, during the revolutions of the 1820s, after the oblivion caused by the restoration of the absolutist monarchical regimes.

The flag adopted by the Kingdom of Piedmont-Sardinia in 1848

The green, white and red flag reappeared during the revolutions of 1830, mainly due to Ciro Menotti, the patriot who started the rebellion in Italy. Menotti, in particular, argued that the best form of state for a united Italy was the monarchy with a sovereign chosen by a national congress. The main points of this idea were Rome as the capital of Italy and the tricolour flag as a national banner. On 5 February 1831, during the Forlì uprisings, the patriot Teresa Cattani wrapped herself in the tricolour flag during the assault on the building that was the seat of the Legation of Romagna, challenging the shots of the papal soldiers.

In 1831, the tricolour was chosen by Giuseppe Mazzini as the emblem of Young Italy. An original flag of Young Italy is kept at the Museum of the Risorgimento and Mazzinian institute in Genoa. From 1833 to 1834, the symbolism of the tricolour spread more and more along the Italian peninsula, starting from northern and central Italy. Mazzini, regarding the reason why the Italian patriots had participated in the uprisings of 1830–1831, said:

Ask those who ran from one point to another to bring together the various districts, to the flag that flew between those riots. That flag was the Italian flag; those first voices were voices of Fatherland and brotherhood. (Note: Chiedetelo a coloro che corsero da un punto all'altro per affratellare le varie contrade, alla bandiera che sventolò tra quei moti. Quella bandiera fu la bandiera italiana; quelle prime voci erano voci di Patria e fratellanza)

— Giuseppe Mazzini

The Italian flag also spread among political exiles, becoming the symbol of the struggle for independence and the claim to have more liberal constitutions. In 1834 the tricolour was adopted by the rioters who tried to invade Savoy, while the tricolour flag of Young Italy was brought to South America in 1835 by Giuseppe Garibaldi during his exile.

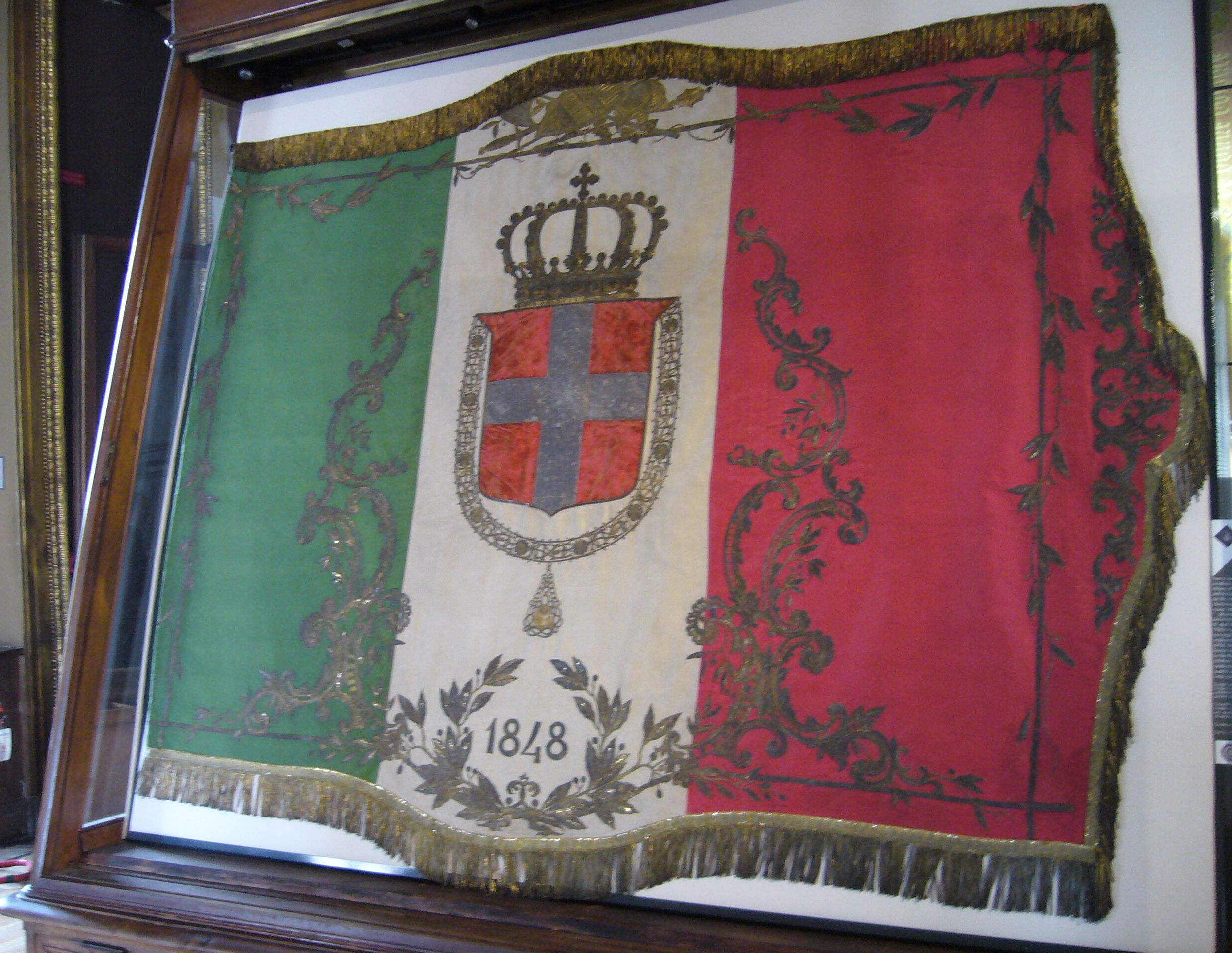
Tricolour flag donated by the women of Milan to King Charles Albert of Piedmont-Sardinia during the First Italian War of Independence (1848–1849). It is displayed at the Royal Armoury of Turin.

The Italian flag was also waved during the uprisings of 1837 in Sicily, of 1841 in Abruzzo and of 1843 in Romagna. In 1844, a tricolour of Young Italy accompanied the Bandiera brothers in their failed attempt to raise the population of the Kingdom of the Two Sicilies. The patriots following the two brothers wore a uniform consisting of a blue and green shirt, white trousers, red handguards, a red and green collar, a red leather belt and a cap with an Italian tricolour cockade pinned.

Italian tricolours waved, challenging the authorities, who had decreed the ban, also on the occasion of the commemoration of the revolt of the Genoese quarter of Portoria against the Habsburg occupiers during the War of the Austrian Succession. During this event, which took place on 10 December 1847 in Genoa at the square of the santuario della Nostra Signora di Loreto of the Genoese district of Oregina, Il Canto degli Italiani by Goffredo Mameli and Michele Novaro played for the first time in history; it would become the Italian national anthem from 1946. Il Canto degli Italiani, in a verse, quotes the Italian flag:

[...] Let one flag, one hope, gather us all. The hour has struck for us to unite. [...] (Note: [...] Raccolgaci un'unica bandiera, una speme: di fonderci insieme, già l'ora suonò. [...])

— Il Canto degli Italiani

These verses, which can be read in the second verse, recall the hope that Italy, still divided into the pre-unification states, would be united in a single nation, gathering under a single flag. Starting from this period the strawberry tree plant began to be considered a national symbol of Italy due to the green leaves, white flowers and red berries, which recall the colours of the Italian flag. The strawberry tree is the national tree of Italy.

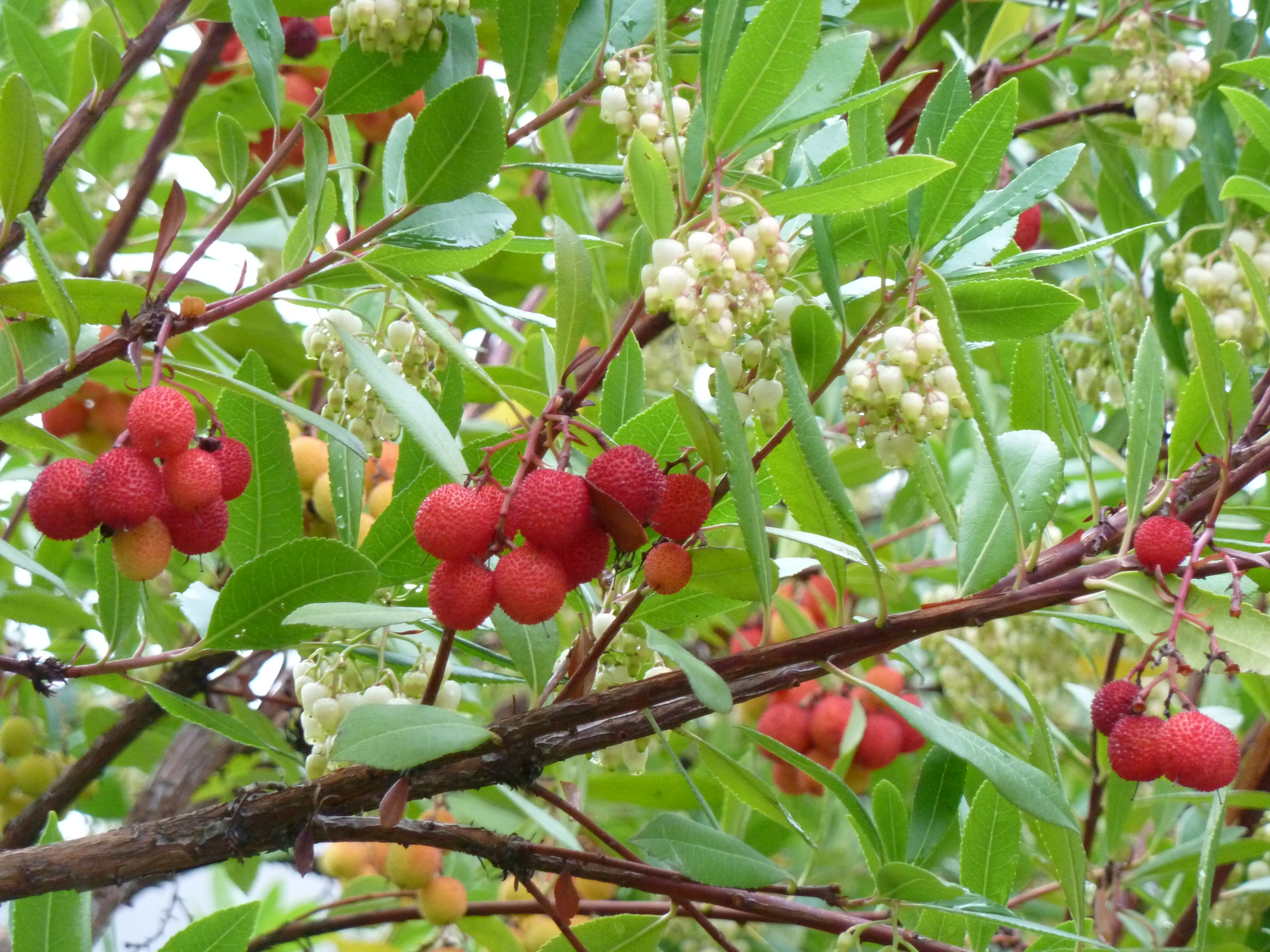
The green leaves, white flowers and red berries of the strawberry tree, whose colours recall the flag of Italy: for this reason this bush is considered one of the Italian national symbols. The strawberry tree is the national tree of Italy.

The Italian flag was a symbol of the revolutions of 1848. In March 1848, the Five Days of Milan, an armed insurrection which led to the temporary liberation of the city from Austrian rule, were characterised by a profusion of flags and tricolour cockades. On 20 March, during furious fighting, with the Austrians barricaded in the Castello Sforzesco and within the defensive systems of the city walls, the patriots Luigi Torelli and Scipione Bagaggia managed to climb on the roof of the Milan Cathedral and hoist the Italian flag on the highest spire of the church, the one on which the Madonnina stands. At the moment of the appearance of the tricolour on the spire of the Madonnina, the crowd below greeted the event with a series of enthusiastic "Hurray!" This historic flag is kept inside the Museum of the Risorgimento in Milan. The patriot Luciano Manara then managed to hoist the tricolour, amidst the Austrian artillery shots, on the top of Porta Tosa. The abandonment of the city by the Austrian troops of field marshal Josef Radetzky, on 22 March, determined the immediate establishment of the provisional government of Milan chaired by the podestà Gabrio Casati, who issued a proclamation that read:

Let's get it over with once with any foreign domination in Italy. Embrace this tricolour flag that flies over the country for your valour and swear never to let it tear again. (Note: Facciamola finita una volta con qualunque dominazione straniera in Italia. Abbracciate questa bandiera tricolore che pel valor vostro sventola sul Paese e giurate di non lasciarvela strappare mai più.)

— Gabrio Casati

The process of transforming the flag of Italy into one of the Italian national symbols was completed, definitively consolidating itself, during the Milanese uprisings.

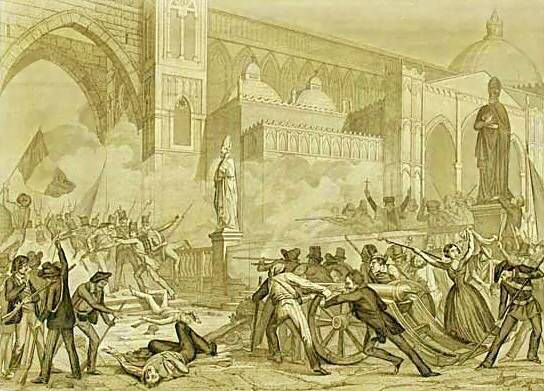
The Sicilian revolution of 1848, which was characterised by a wide use of the tricolour

The following day King Charles Albert of Piedmont-Sardinia assured the provisional government of Milan that his troops, ready to come to his aid by starting the First Italian War of Independence, would use a tricolour defaced with the Savoyan coat of arms superimposed on the white as a war flag. In his proclamation to the Lombard–Venetian people, Charles Albert said:

"In order to show more clearly with exterior signs the commitment to Italian unification, we want that Our troops ... have the Savoy shield placed on the Italian tricolour flag. (Note: Per viemmeglio dimostrare con segni esteriori il sentimento dell'unione italiana, vogliamo che le nostre truppe, entrando nel territorio della Lombardia e della Venezia, portino lo Scudo di Savoia sovrapposto alla bandiera tricolore italiana)

— Charles Albert of Piedmont-Sardinia

As the arms, blazoned gules a cross argent, mixed with the white of the flag, it was fimbriated azure, blue being the dynastic colour, although this does not conform to the heraldic rule of tincture. The rectangular civil and state variants were adopted in 1851.

A makeshift tricolour consisting of redshirts, green displays and a white sheet was hoisted on the flagpole of the ship that brought Giuseppe Garibaldi back to Italy from South America shortly after the outbreak of the First Italian War of Independence. The patriots who had gathered at the port of Genoa to welcome her return gave Anita Garibaldi, in front of 3,000 people, a tricolour to be given to Giuseppe Garibaldi so that he could plant it on Lombard soil.

The Grand Duchy of Tuscany in the act of granting the constitution (17 February 1848) did not change the national banner ("The State retains its flag and its colours") but later granted the Tuscan militias, by decree, the use of a tricolour scarf next to the symbols of the Grand Duchy (25 March 1848). The Grand Duke, following the pressure of the Tuscan patriots, then adopted the tricolour flag also as a state banner and as a military banner for the troops sent to help Charles Albert of Piedmont-Sardinia. Similar measures were adopted by the Duchy of Parma and Piacenza and by the Duchy of Modena and Reggio.

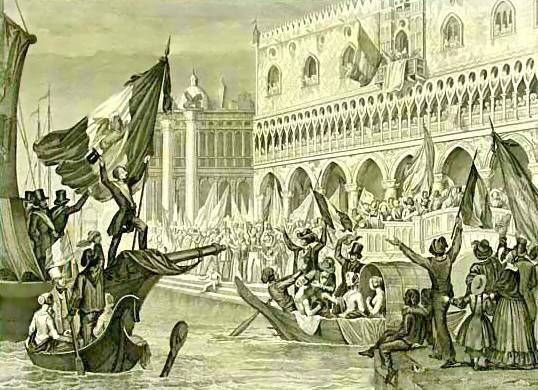
The proclamation the Republic of San Marco in Venice (1848), event that was characterised by a waving of tricolour flags

The flag of the Constitutional Kingdom of the Two Sicilies, a white field charged with the coats of arms of Castile, Leon, Aragon, Two Sicilies, and Granada, was modified by Ferdinand II through the addition of a red and green border. This flag lasted from 3 April 1848 until 19 May 1849. The Provisional Government of Sicily, which lasted from 12 January 1848 to 15 May 1849 during the Sicilian Revolution, adopted the Italian tricolour, defaced with the trinacria, or triskelion.

The Republic of San Marco, proclaimed independent in 1848 by the Austrian Empire, also adopted the tricolour. The flags that they adopted marked the link to Italian independence and unification efforts. The former, the Italian tricolour undefaced, and the latter, charged with the winged lion of St. Mark, from the flag of the Republic of Venice (maritime republic which existed from 697 AD until 1797 AD), on a white canton. A chronicler of the time described the final moments of the subsequent capitulation of the Republic of San Marco by the Austrian troops, which took place on 22 August 1849:

The tricolour flags waved above every work, in every danger, and because the enemy balls not only tore up the silk, but broke the stick, it was immediately found who at great risk was going to replace another. (Note: Le bandiere tricolori sventolavano sopra ogni opera, in ogni pericolo, e perché le palle nemiche non solo ne stracciavano la seta, ma rompevano il bastone, si trovava subito chi a gran rischio andava a sostituirne un'altra.)

— Chronicler witnessing the last hours of the Republic of San Marco

The tricolour flag of 1848 that greeted the expulsion of the Austrians from Venice is kept in the Museum of the Risorgimento and the Venetian 19th century.

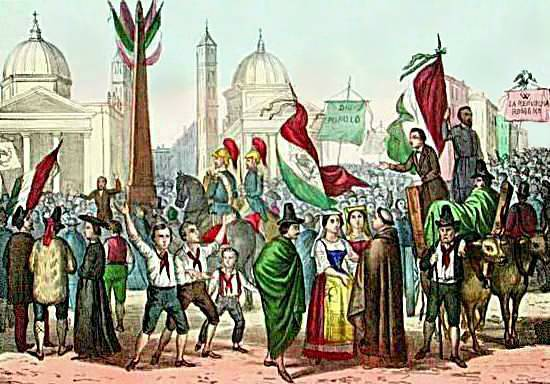
The proclamation of the Roman Republic in Piazza del Popolo (1848) in Rome among a profusion of tricolour flags

In 1849, the Roman Republic, formed following the revolt against the Papal State that dethroned the Pope, adopted as its national banner a green, white and red flag with a republican Roman eagle at the tip of the pole. This lasted for four months, while the Papal States of the Church was in abeyance. The Roman Republic resisted until 4 July 1849, when it was capitulated by the French Army. The troops from beyond the Alps, as a last act, entered the municipality of Rome where the last members of the republican assembly not yet captured were barricaded. Their secretary Quirico Filopanti surrendered wearing a tricolour scarf.

The tricolour also flew over the barricades of the Ten Days of Brescia, a revolt of the citizens of the Lombard city against the Austrian Empire, and in many other centres such as Varese, Gallarate, Como, Melegnano, Cremona, Monza, Udine, Trento, Verona, Rovigo, Vicenza, Belluno and Padua. This spread throughout the Italian Peninsula and demonstrated that the tricolour flag had by then assumed a consolidated symbolism valid throughout the national territory. The iconography of the Italian flag then began to spread not only in the vexillological and military fields, but also in some everyday objects such as scarves and clothing fabrics.

This turning point lasted until the failure of revolutions and the end of the First Italian War of Independence (1849), which ended with the defeat of the Piedmont-Sardinian Army of Charles Albert; after this, the ancient flags were restored. Only the Kingdom of Piedmont-Sardinia confirmed the Italian tricolour as the national flag of the state even after the First Italian War of Independence ended. After the defeat in the First Italian War of Independence in 1849, Charles Albert abdicated in favour of his son Victor Emmanuel II.

==== From the unification of Italy to World War I ====
Kingdom of Italy
- Use: State flag, state and naval ensign
- Proportion: 2:3
- Adopted: 1861 (proclamation of the Kingdom of Italy)
- Relinquished: 1946 (birth of the Italian Republic)
- Design: A vertical tricolour of green, white, and red, defaced with the arms of Savoy and crown
- Use: Civil flag and ensign
- Proportion: 2:3
- Adopted: 1861 (proclamation of the Kingdom of Italy)
- Relinquished: 1946 (birth of the Italian Republic)
- Design: A vertical tricolour of green, white, and red, defaced with the arms of Savoy
- Use: War flag
- Proportion: 1:1
- Adopted: 1861 (proclamation of the Kingdom of Italy)
- Relinquished: 1946 (birth of the Italian Republic)
- Design: A defaced Italian tricolour

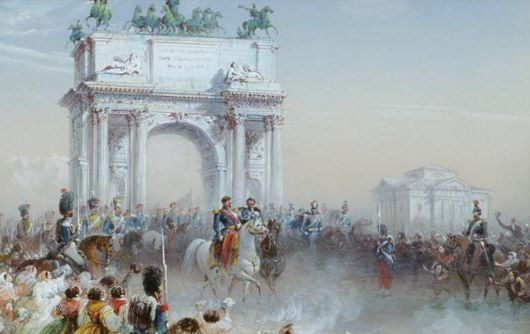
Victor Emmanuel II and Napoleon III of France entered Milan during the Second Italian War of Independence (1859).

On 14 April 1855, before the departure for the Crimean War, the Italian tricolour flags were solemnly entrusted to the soldiers of the Sardinian Expeditionary Corps in the Crimean War by King Victor Emmanuel II of Piedmont-Sardinia with the following farewell sentence:

Soldiers! Here are your flags. Generously unfurled by the magnanimous Charles Albert, they remind you of the distant homeland and eight centuries of noble traditions. Know how to defend them; bring them back crowned with new glory and your sacrifices will be blessed by present and future generations. (Note: Movete dunque fidenti nella vittoria, e di novelli allori fregiate la Vostra bandiera, quella bandiera coi tre colori e colla eletta gioventù qui da ogni parte d'Italia convenuta e sotto a lei raccolta, vi addita che avete compito vostro l'indipendenza d'Italia, questa giusta e santa impresa che sarà il vostro grido di guerraSoldati! Eccovi le vostre bandiere. Generosamente spiegate dal magnanimo Carlo Alberto, vi ricordino la patria lontana ed otto secoli di nobili tradizioni. Sappiate difenderle; riportatele coronate di nuova gloria ed i vostri sacrifici saranno benedetti dalle presenti e dalle future generazioni.)

— Victor Emmanuel II of Piedmont-Sardinia

One of the Italian flags that participated in the Crimean War is kept in the Royal Armoury of Turin. In 1857, an Italian flag with the pole surmounted by a Phrygian cap and with an archipendulum, a symbol of social balance, was a symbol of the Sapri expedition, or rather the failed attempt to trigger a revolt in the Kingdom of the Two Sicilies perpetrated by Carlo Pisacane. In order not to be captured, Pisacane committed suicide, and was reported to be bandaged with the tricolour flag.

On 10 January 1859, King Victor Emmanuel II of Piedmont-Sardinia, in front of the members of parliament, announced the imminent entry into war of the Kingdom of Piedmont-Sardinia against the Austrian Empire:

So move confidently in the victory, and with new laurels adorn your flag, that flag with the three colours and with the chosen youth here from every part of Italy agreed and gathered under her, it shows you that you have the independence of Italy, this just and holy enterprise which will be your war cry (Note: Movete dunque fidenti nella vittoria, e di novelli allori fregiate la Vostra bandiera, quella bandiera coi tre colori e colla eletta gioventù qui da ogni parte d'Italia convenuta e sotto a lei raccolta, vi addita che avete compito vostro l'indipendenza d'Italia, questa giusta e santa impresa che sarà il vostro grido di guerra)

— Victor Emmanuel II of Piedmont-Sardinia

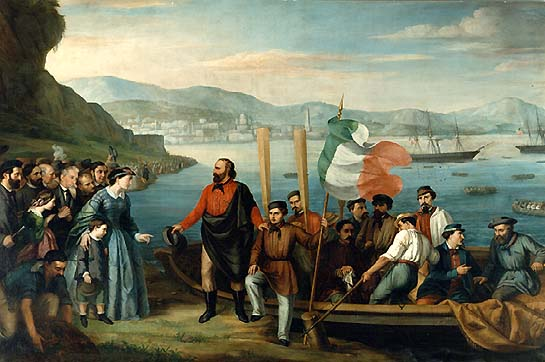
The departure of the Expedition of the Thousand (1860–1861)

When the Second Italian War of Independence (1859) broke out, volunteers from all over Italy were enrolled in the Piedmont-Sardinian army.

During the Second Italian War of Independence, the cities that were gradually conquered by Victor Emmanuel II of Piedmont-Sardinia and Napoleon III of France greeted the two sovereigns as liberators in a riot of flags and tricolour cockades; even the centres about to ask for annexation to the Kingdom of Piedmont-Sardinia through plebiscites underlined their desire to be part of a united Italy with the waving of the tricolour. The Italian flag waved in Lombardy, annexed following the victory of the Kingdom of Piedmont-Sardinia in the Second Italian War of Independence, as well as in Tuscany, Emilia, Marche and Umbria, annexed in the following year to the Kingdom of Piedmont-Sardinia through plebiscites, but also in cities that would have had to wait some time before being annexed, such as Rome and Naples.

The enthusiasm of the population toward the tricolour grew in addition to the army of the Kingdom of Piedmont-Sardinia and the troops of volunteers who participated in the Second Italian War of Independence, the green, white and red flag spread widely available in newly conquered or annexed regions by plebiscites, appearing on house windows, in shop windows and in public places such as hotels and taverns.

The tricolour was also the flag of the United Provinces of Central Italy, a short-lived military government established by the Kingdom of Piedmont-Sardinia that was formed by a union of the former Grand Duchy of Tuscany, Duchy of Parma, Duchy of Modena, and the Papal Legations, after their monarchs were ousted by popular revolutions. The United Provinces of Central Italy existed from 1859 to 1860, when they were annexed to the Kingdom of Piedmont-Sardinia.

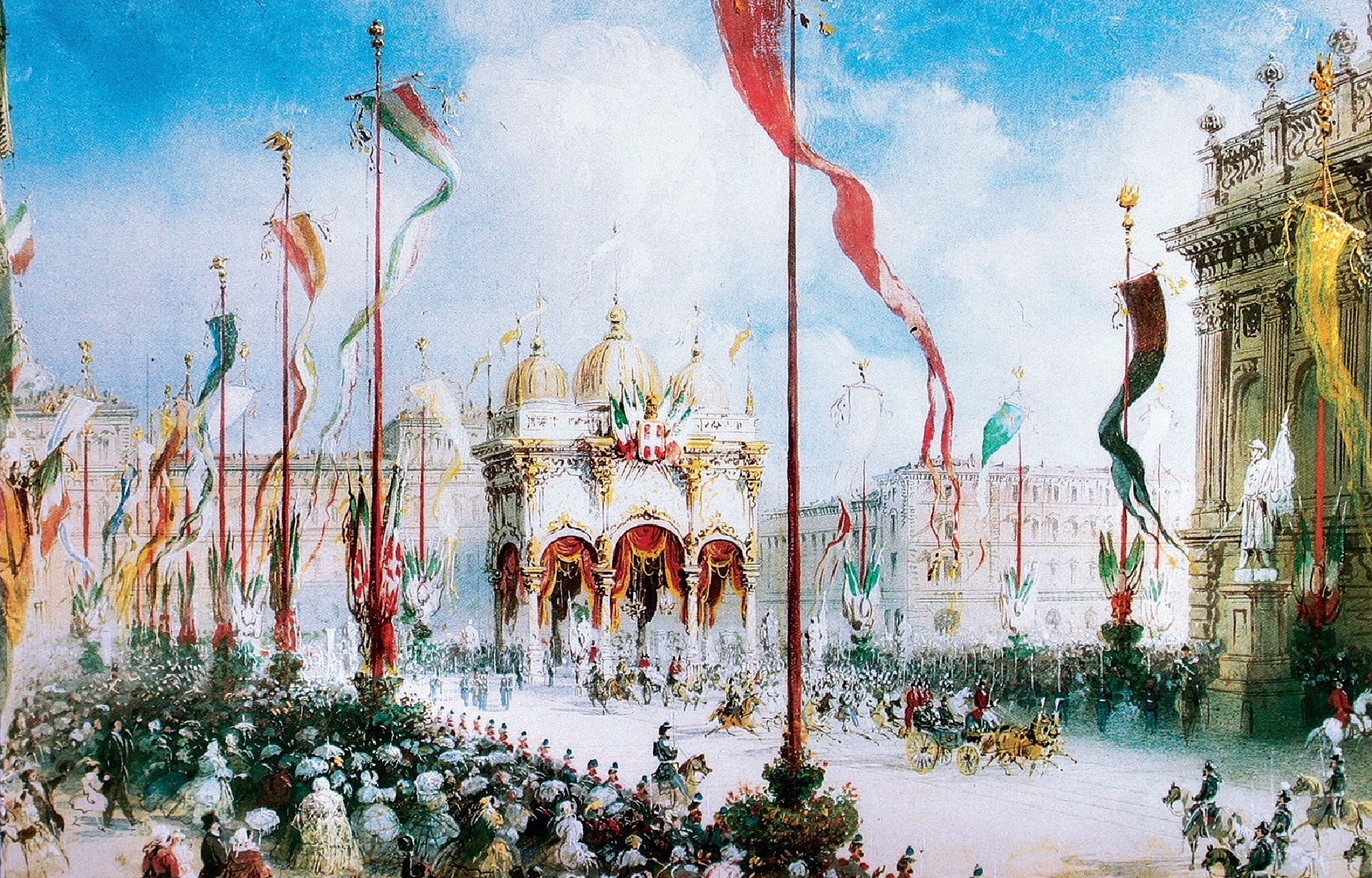
The royal procession at the opening of the Parliament of the Kingdom of Italy (1861) among a profusion of tricolour flags

The tricolour accompanied, although not officially, also the volunteers of the Expedition of the Thousand (1860–1861) led by Giuseppe Garibaldi, whose goal was to conquer the Kingdom of the Two Sicilies. Garibaldi, in particular, had an absolute deference and respect for the Italian flag. Shortly after the loss of Sicily, on 25 June 1860, trying to limit the damage given the growing participation of the population in the Expedition of the Thousand, King Francis II of the Two Sicilies, decreed that the green, white and red flag was also the official banner of his Kingdom, with the House of Bourbon-Two Sicilies coat of arms superimposed on the white. Adopted on 21 June 1860, this lasted until 17 March 1861, when the Two Sicilies was incorporated into the Kingdom of Piedmont-Sardinia, after its defeat in the Expedition of the Thousand. Ironically, in the final phase of the Expedition of the Thousand, the tricolour of the Kingdom of the Two Sicilies fluttered in antagonism to the tricolour flag of the Kingdom of Piedmont-Sardinia. Two of the original tricolours that flew on the Lombardo steamship that participated, together with Piedmont, in the Expedition of the Thousand, are preserved, respectively, inside the Central Museum of the Risorgimento at the Vittoriano in Rome and the Museum of the Risorgimento in Palermo.

Animated map of the Italian unification from 1829 to 1871

On 17 March 1861, there was the proclamation of the Kingdom of Italy, a formal act that sanctioned, with a normative act of the Kingdom of Piedmont-Sardinia, the birth of the unified Kingdom of Italy. On 15 April 1861, the flag of the Kingdom of Piedmont-Sardinia was declared the flag of the newly formed Kingdom of Italy. The tricolour therefore continued to be the national flag also of the new State, although not officially recognised by a specific law, but regulated with regard to the shape of military banners. This Italian tricolour, with the armorial bearings of the former Royal House of Savoy, was the first national flag and lasted in that form for 85 years until the birth of the Italian Republic in 1946.

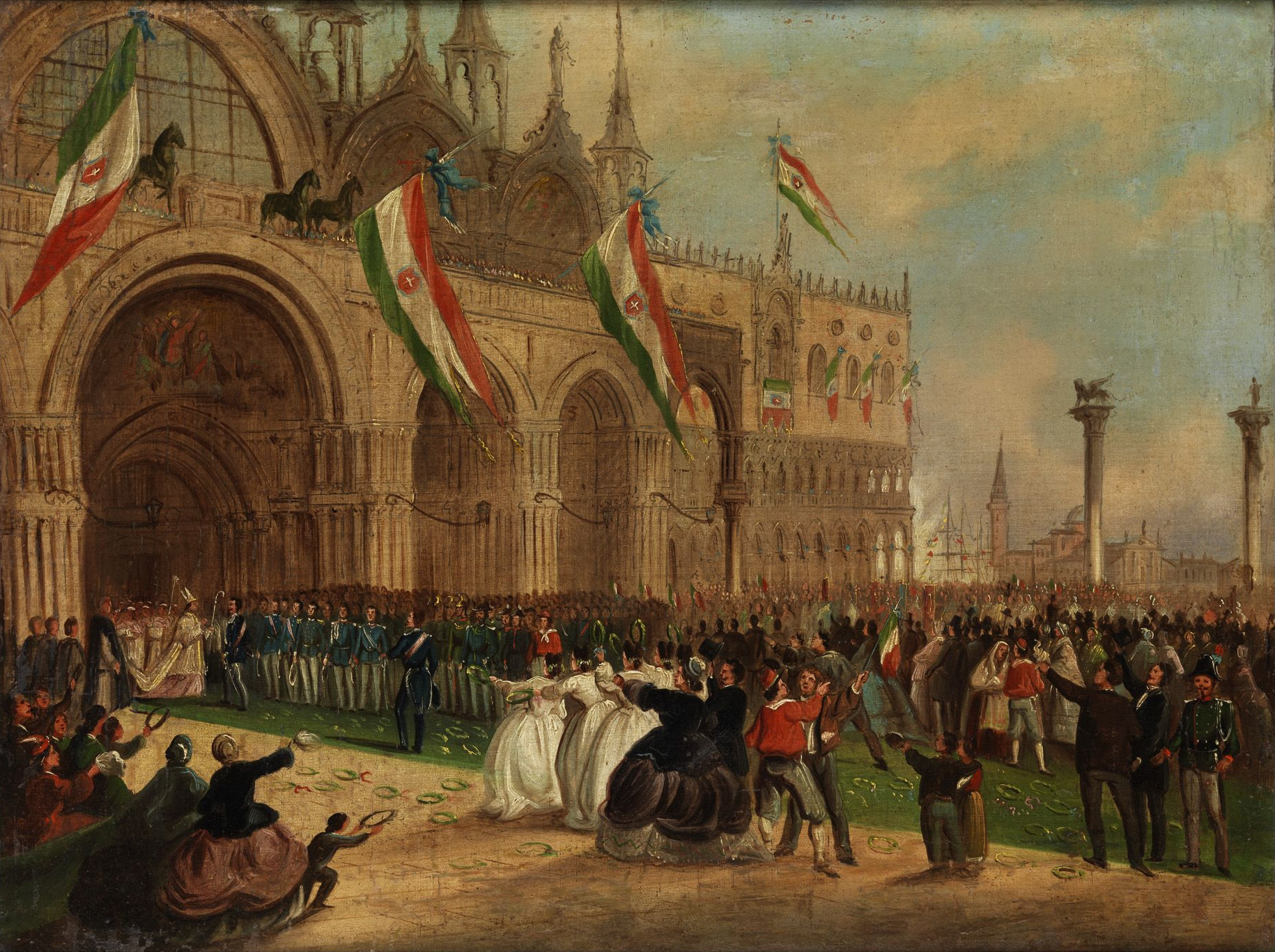
King Victor Emmanuel II of Italy entering Venice during the Third Italian War of Independence (1866) among a profusion of tricolour flags

The tricolore had a universal, transversal meaning, shared by both monarchists and republicans, progressives and conservatives and Guelphs as well as by the Ghibellines. The tricolour was chosen as the flag of a united Italy also for this reason. After the Unification of Italy, the use of the tricolour became increasingly widespread among the population as the flag and its colours began to appear on the labels of commercial products, school notebooks, the first cars and cigar packages. Even among the aristocrats it was successful; the most important families often had a flag bearer installed on the main façade of their mansions where they placed the Italian tricolour. It then began to appear outside public buildings, schools, judicial offices and post offices. During this period, tricolour bands were introduced for mayors and the jurors of the assize court during this period.

Following the Third Italian War of Independence in 1866, Veneto and Friuli were annexed to the Kingdom of Italy; the entry of the Italian Army troops into Venice, which took place on 19 October 1866, was greeted by a profusion of tricolour flags. Since the promulgation of a resolution of its municipal council, dated 5 November 1866, Vicenza is the only city in Italy to have adopted the tricolour flag as its own gonfalon, instead of the civic banner, loaded with the coat of arms of the municipality. The Venetian city decided to patriotically change the nature of its sign shortly before the visit of King Victor Emmanuel II, who arrived in the city for the awarding of the Gold Medal of Military Valour earned by the Venetian municipality with the battle of Monte Berico, fought on 10 June 1848 in the outskirts of the city. The occasion of the Sovereign's visit, Vicenza presented Victor Emmanuel II not with his own banner but, a decision from which his subsequent resolution was to originate, the Italian tricolour.

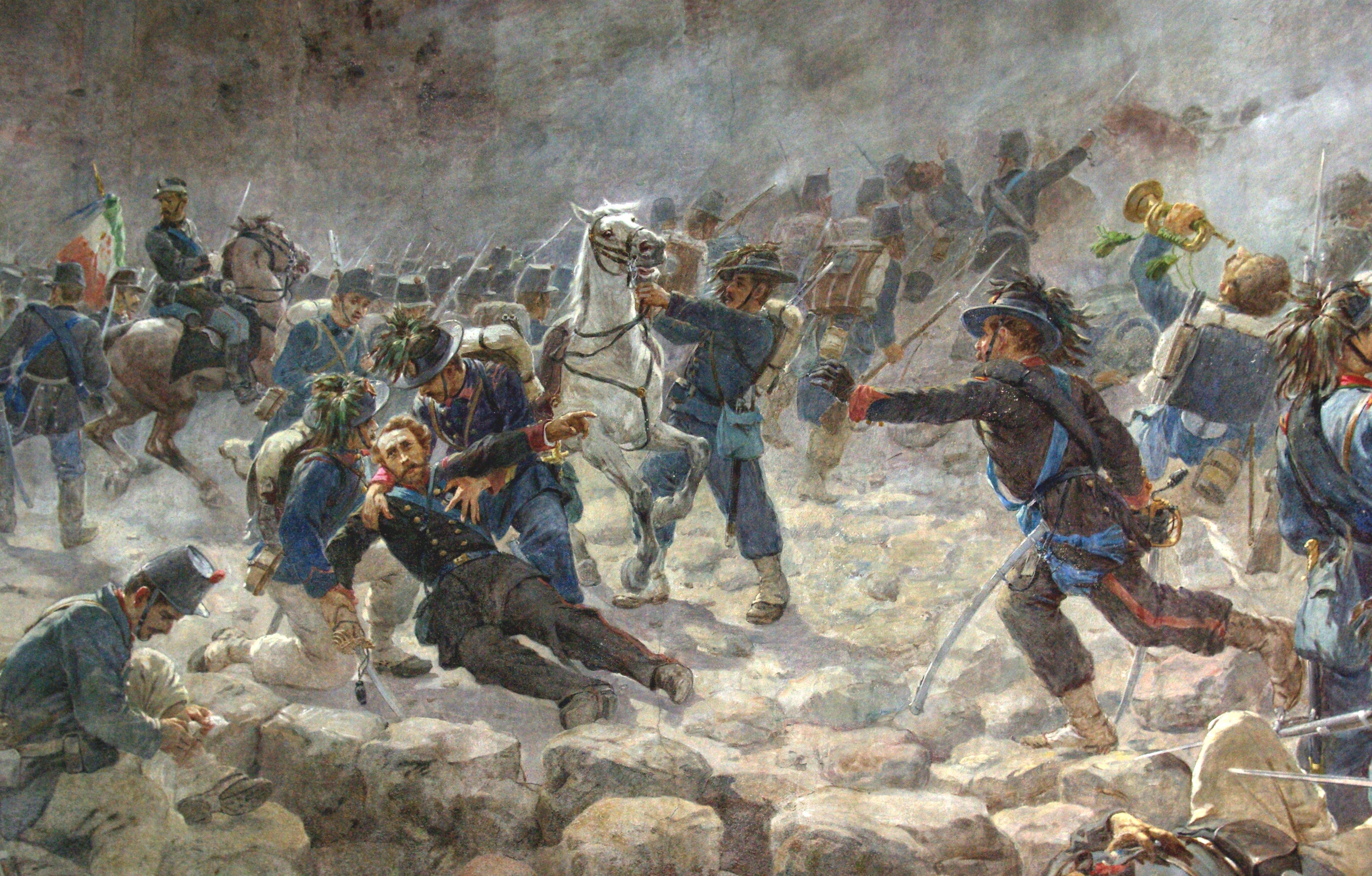
A moment of the fighting that led to the conquest of Rome by the Italian Army (1870)

During the battle of Custoza (24 June 1866), part of the Third Italian War of Independence, near Oliosi, today part of the municipality of Castelnuovo del Garda, the soldiers of the 44th regiment of the "Forlì" brigade saved the tricolour war flag from the capture of the Austro-Hungarian Army. In order not to hand over their military banner to the enemy, they tore the drape of the tricolour flag into 13 pieces, divided among those present, and hid those shreds of cloth under the jacket. After the war it was possible to recover 11 of the 13 portions of the cloth and thus reconstruct the flag, named Tricolore di Oliosi. Every year, on the third Sunday in June, the remembrance of the war episode is celebrated in Oliosi. At the military parade on 2 June 2011, held in via dei Fori Imperiali in Rome on the occasion of the celebrations for the 150th anniversary of the unification of Italy, the Tricolore di Oliosi was paraded on a cannon carriage along with five other historic Italian flags.

Massimo d'Azeglio was among the first to recognise the importance of the tricolour flag as a tool for forming a widespread national awareness. In this regard he declared: "The flag is a privileged symbol in the pedagogy of a nation". Tricolour flags then greeted the Italian Army during the march toward Rome, which ended with the capture of Rome on 20 September 1870, and the annexation of Lazio to the Kingdom of Italy. Rome officially became the capital of Italy on 1 January 1871, while the establishment of the royal court and the Savoy government took place on 6 July of the same year. From this date, the Italian flag flies from the highest flagpole of the Quirinal Palace.

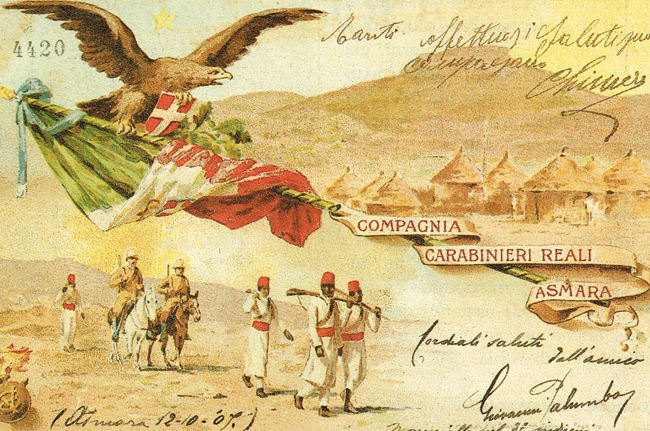
Postcard of the Carabinieri sent from the Italian Eritrea in 1907 and depicting an eagle flying an Italian flag

The first Italian colony was founded in 1882, the Assab bay, which became the first outpost of the future Italian Eritrea, where the flag of Italy waved in an Italian colony for the first time. Subsequently, the tricolour also waved in the Italian Somaliland, in the Italian Libya, in the Italian concession of Tientsin and in the Italian Islands of the Aegean.

In 1897, the Italian flag had its 100th anniversary. The centennial celebration in Reggio Emilia, where the tricolour was created on 7 January 100 years earlier, Giosuè Carducci, who later became the first Italian to win the Nobel Prize in Literature in 1906, defined the flag as "blessed" and kissed it at the end of the speech.

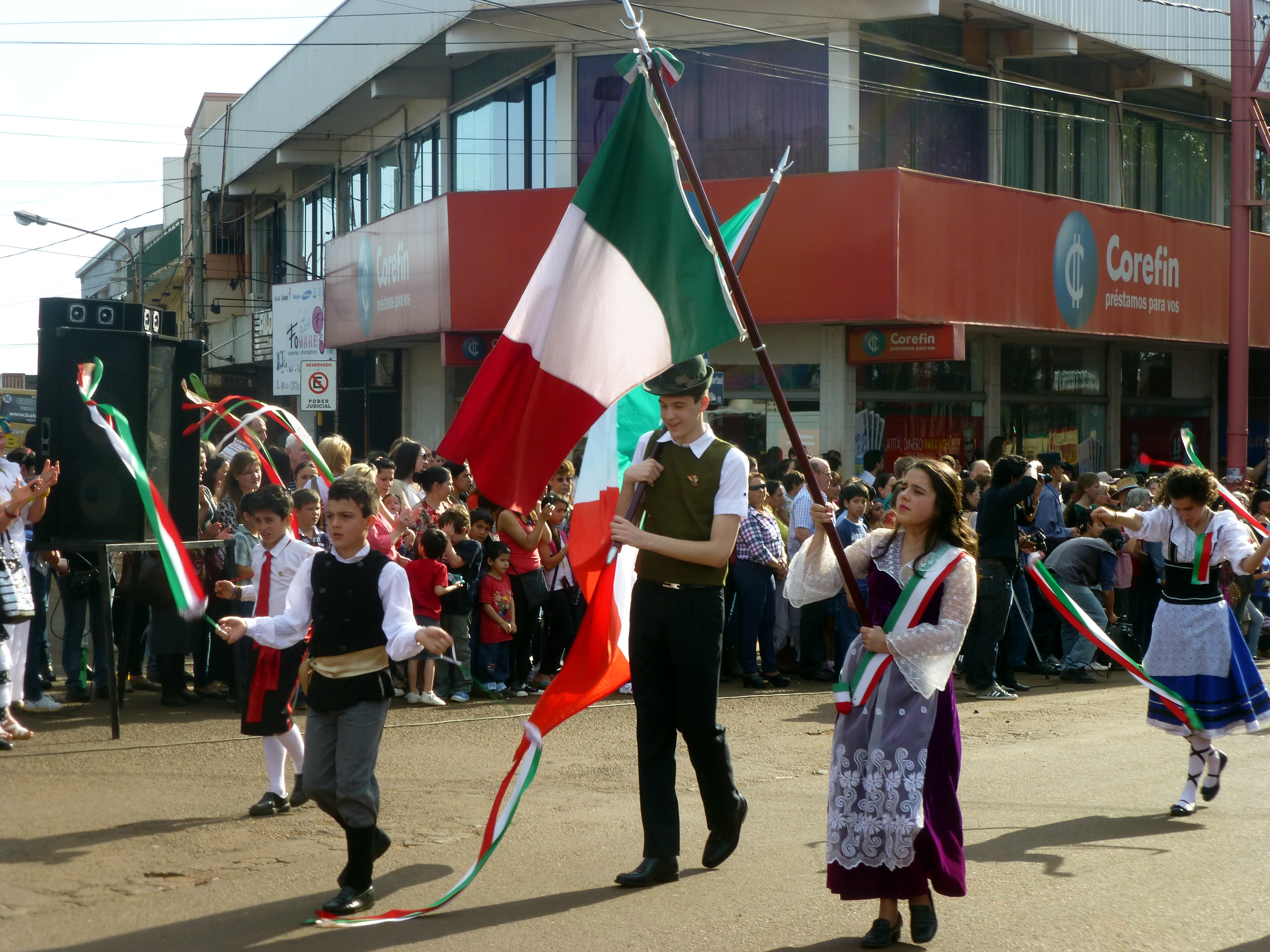
Italian Argentines during the opening parade of the XXXIV Immigrant's Festival

Around 1880 began large waves of Italian diaspora, especially towards the Americans. The tricolour, often carried in the suitcases of migrants, began to wave outside the national borders, especially in the Little Italies that were forming around the world. This bond with the land of origin did not fade with the passing of generations—often still alive in the third or fourth generation. Several years earlier in 1861, U.S. president Abraham Lincoln reviewed some military units that were participating in the American Civil War—among them was a Garibaldi Guard, made up of Italian immigrants, which had as its military banner the tricolour flag.

In 1885, the tricolour jersey was introduced for the cyclist who won the title of champion of Italy. Conceptually, this recognition is similar to the placement of a tricolour shield, the scudetto, on the jerseys of the team champion of Italy in football, rugby, volleyball and basketball. The idea of affixing a scudetto on the shirts of the winning sports teams of the respective national championships was Gabriele D'Annunzio. In football, the first sport to use it, it was introduced in 1924.

In 1889, in the culinary field, the pizza Margherita was invented, named in honour of Queen Margherita of Savoy, whose main ingredients recall the tricolour flag; green for the basil, white for the mozzarella and red for the tomato sauce. With the first trade union struggles at the end of the 19th century, the Italian flag began to wave in the hands of the demonstrators during strikes. Even during the struggles perpetrated by the Fasci Siciliani between 1892 and 1894 there was a profusion of Italian flag. They were contrasted by the tricolours of the police sent by the government to quell the trade union revolts. On 25 April 1900, the Italian flag flew in the Franz Josef Land, an archipelago located north of the Russian Empire between the Arctic Ocean and the Kara Sea, an expedition organized in the arctic areas led by explorer Umberto Cagni.

On 29 July 1900, King Umberto I of Italy, who succeeded his father Victor Emmanuel II in 1878, was assassinated in Monza at a public ceremony with the streets flagged with tricolours. The king was shot four times by the Italian-American anarchist Gaetano Bresci. Bresci claimed he wanted to avenge the people killed in Milan during the suppression of the riots of May 1898. Umberto I was succeeded by his son Victor Emmanuel III of Italy.

=== The two world wars and the interwar period ===
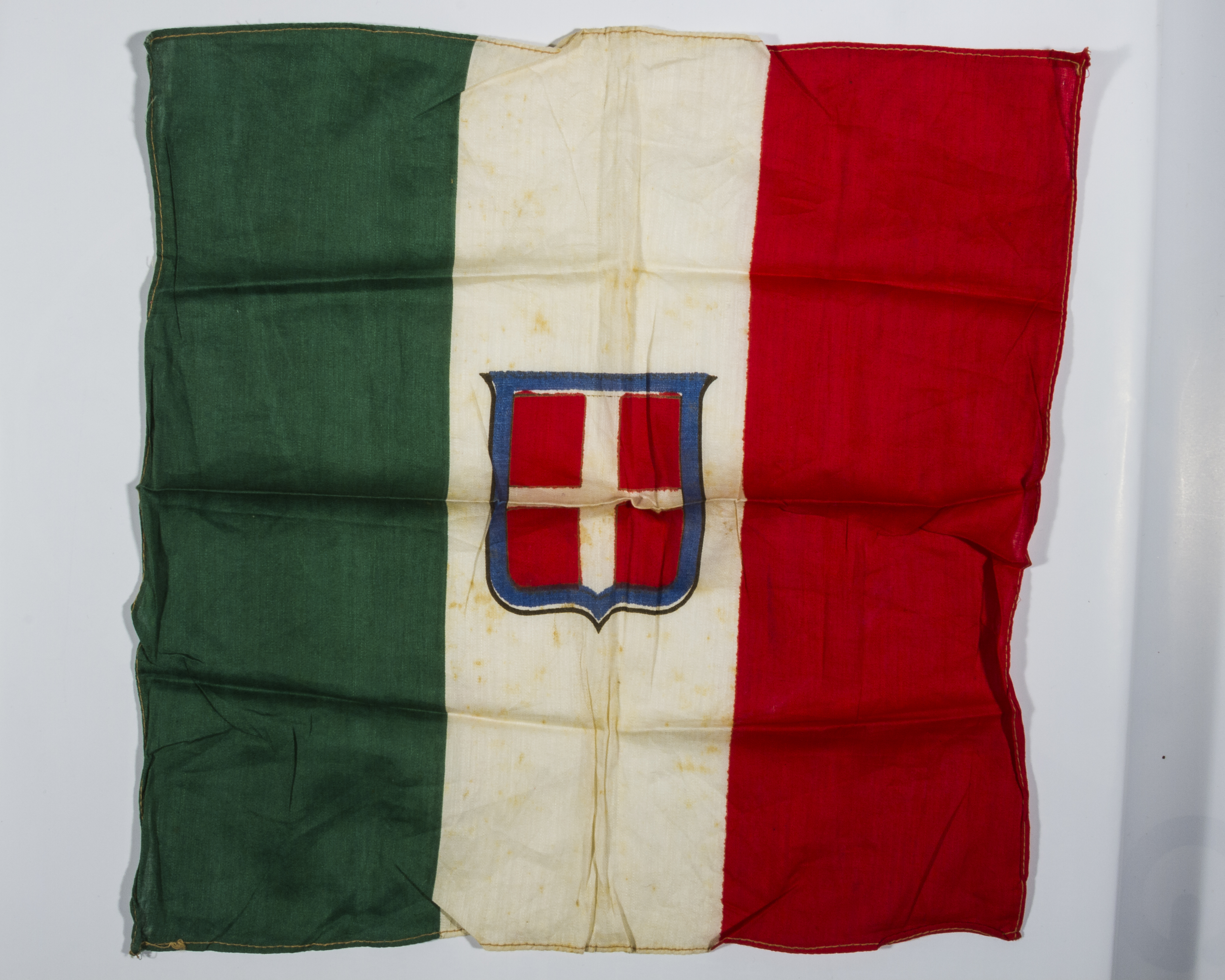
Italian flag dating from World War I

Italy entered World War I in 1915 with the aim of completing national unity, and for this reason, the Italian intervention in World War I is also considered the Fourth Italian War of Independence in a historiographical perspective that identifies in the latter the conclusion of the unification of Italy, whose military actions began during the revolutions of 1848 with the First Italian War of Independence. King Victor Emmanuel III of Italy, the day the Kingdom of Italy entered the war, appeared from the balcony of the Quirinal Palace while waving the tricolour shouting "Long live Italy". Victor Emmanuel III then made an official proclamation shortly before leaving for the Italian war front, which read, in its final part:

Soldiers of land and sea! [...] To us the glory of planting the tricolour of Italy on the sacred boundary that nature placed on the borders of our homeland, to us the glory of finally completing the work with so much heroism begun by our fathers. (Note: Soldati di terra e di mare! [...] A voi la gloria di piantare il Tricolore d'Italia su i termini sacri che natura pose a confine della Patria nostra, a voi la gloria di compiere, finalmente, l'opera con tanto eroismo iniziata dai nostri padri.)

— Victor Emmanuel III of Italy

The tricolour flag was a symbol in both the trenches and in the civil sphere. The colours green, white and red were widely used as a stimulus to the general mobilisation and moral sustenance of the civilian population, which was climbing a path that would have led to a very difficult situation, characterised by many deprivations. In the trenches, the tricolour was a fundamental symbol to spur the soldiers, while on the home front it was important for compacting and strengthening civil society.

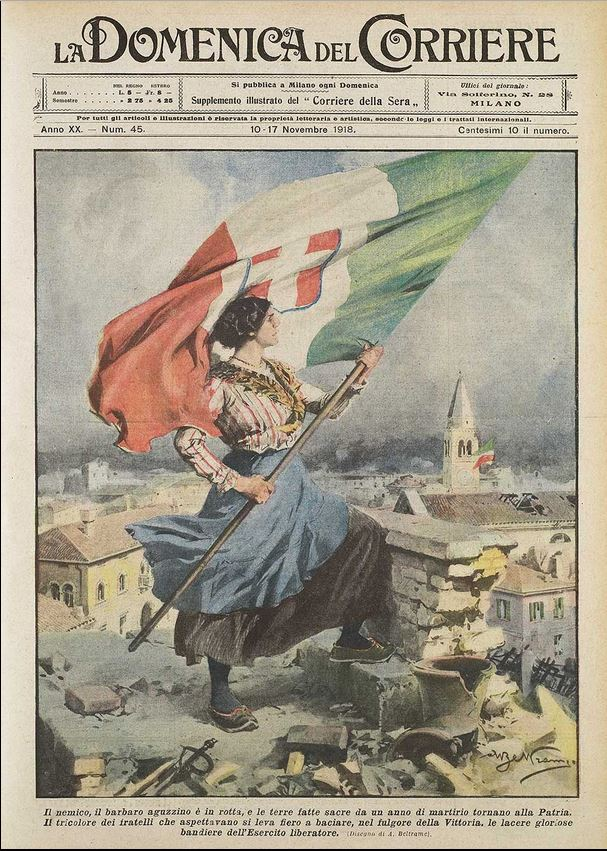
A woman, representing Italy, celebrates the Italian victory over Austria-Hungary in World War I with a tricolour over the newly conquered city of Trieste.

During the flight over Vienna, on 9 August 1918 aerial flyer Gabriele D'Annunzio launched the tricolour leaflet over Vienna with which he exhorted the enemy to surrender and end the war. The Italian troops then entered Trieste in November 1918 following the victory in the battle of Vittorio Veneto, which ended the conflict with the retreat and the definitive defeat of the Austrians. The War Bulletin No. 1267 of 3 November 1918 by General Armando Diaz announced the Bollettino della Vittoria and the Bollettino della Vittoria Navale by few days, read:

Our troops have occupied Trento and landed in Trieste. The tricolour flies over the Buonconsiglio Castle and the San Giusto tower. (Note: Le nostre truppe hanno occupato Trento e sono sbarcate a Trieste. Il tricolore sventola sul castello del Buonconsiglio e sulla torre di San Giusto)

— Armando Diaz

After World War I, the Italian flag was also a symbol of the Impresa di Fiume, led by D'Annunzio, and a consequence of the so-called "mutilated victory", a term used to describe the dissatisfaction concerning territorial rewards in favour of Italy at the end of World War I, shouted: "raise the flag: wave the tricolour!" During the Italian Regency of Carnaro (1919–1920), a state entity that administered the city of Fiume, now part of modern-day Croatia, D'Annunzio defined the Italian flag "the garment of the eternal nation" and urged the Italians to rebel against those responsible for the defeat of Caporetto by waving the "tricolour across the sky".

In particular, Italy, as a peace agreement at the conclusion of World War I, signed the Treaty of Saint-Germain-en-Laye (1919) and the Treaty of Rapallo (1920), which allowed the annexation of Trentino Alto-Adige, Julian March, Istria, Kvarner, with the cities of Trieste, Trento, Gorizia, Pola, as well as the Dalmatian city of Zara. The subsequent Treaty of Rome (1924) led to the annexation of the city of Fiume to Italy.

The coffin of the Italian Unknown Soldier was placed on the gun carriage of a cannon and wrapped in a tricolour flag during its journey from the Basilica di Santa Maria Assunta, Aquileia to the Altare della Patria in Rome, which took place in 1921 on a railway hearse. This historic flag is kept inside the Central Museum of the Risorgimento at the Vittoriano in Rome.

Italian Fascist flag during the 1920s bearing the fasces.

The War flag of the Italian Social Republic (1943–1945)

With the royal decree nº 2072 of 24 September 1923 and subsequently with the law nº2264 of 24 December 1925, the tricolour officially became the national flag of the Kingdom of Italy. On 31 January 1923, the salute to the flag by the students of Italian schools was instituted by the Ministry of Public Education whereby every Saturday morning, at the end of the lesson, the students paid homage to the flag with the Roman salute and with the performance of patriotic musical pieces.

In 1926, the Fascist regime attempted to have the Italian national flag redesigned by having the fasces, the symbol used by the Fascist movement, included on the flag. This attempt by the Fascist government to change the Italian flag to incorporate the fasces was stopped by strong opposition to the proposal by Italian monarchists. The Fascist government raised the national tricolour flag along with a Fascist black flag in public ceremonies.

Flag of the National Liberation Committee (1943–1945)

In 1926, an Italian flag was first brought to the North Pole by the Norge airship during the expedition led by Umberto Nobile and Roald Amundsen; the tricolours then greeted Italo Balbo in his oceanic seaplane crossings.

The Azione Cattolica, which made the Italian flag its banner in 1931, grouped the children of its organisation dedicated to children into three categories, which were based on age group and colours of the Italian flag: "green flames", "white flames" and "red flames". In August 1933, the Italian ocean liner SS Rex, which had just won the Blue Riband, arrived in New York City setting the record for Atlantic Ocean crossing in the shortest time (four days) was greeted by the waving of tricolour flags.

Trains covered with tricolour flags carried the settlers to the new cities founded after the reclamation of the Pontine Marshes, while on 5 May 1936 there was the solemn flag-raising in Addis Ababa, Italian Ethiopia, which greeted the founding of the Italian Empire. The flag in Addis Ababa was then lowered in November 1941 at the end of the East African campaign, which was fought during World War II.

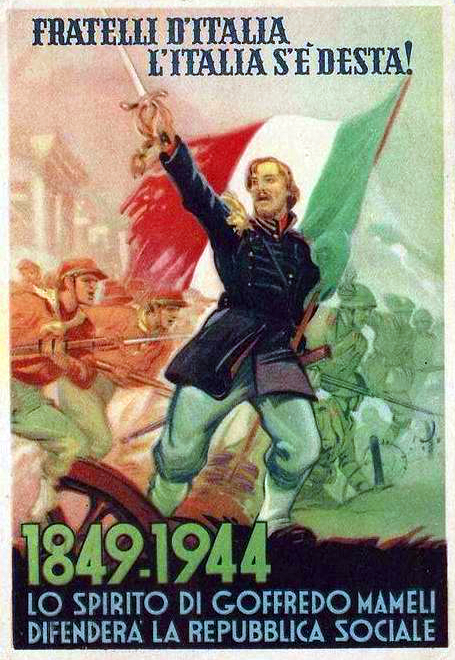
Il Canto degli Italiani and Goffredo Mameli remembered together with the period of the unification of Italy on a propaganda poster of the Italian Social Republic. In the background, a tricolour is waving.

Italy entered World War II on 10 June 1940 with the speech by Benito Mussolini delivered from the main balcony of Palazzo Venezia in Rome, but the climate was different from that which characterised Italy's entry into World War I. The king did not appear on the balcony of the Quirinal Palace waving the flag as he did in 1915.

During World War II, the Italian flag came back strongly after the Armistice of Cassibile of 8 September 1943, where it was taken as a symbol by the two sides who faced each other in the Italian Civil War in an attempt to recall the unification of Italy and its cultural tradition. In particular, it was used by the partisans as a symbol of the struggle against tyrants and emblem of the dream of a free Italy. Even the communist partisan brigades, which had the red flag as the official banner, often waved the Italian flag.

Tricolour flags were also the official banners of the Italian Partisan Republics and of the National Liberation Committee, as well as their antagonists, the Republicans in an attempt to recall the period of the unification of Italy and its cultural background. The national flag of the short-lived Fascist state in northern Italy, the Italian Social Republic (1943–1945), or "Republic of Salò" as it was commonly known, was identical to the flag of the modern Italian Republic, as both republics used the previous flag of the Kingdom of Italy with the coat of arms of Savoy removed.

This flag was rarely seen, while the war flag, charged with a silver/black eagle clutching horizontally placed fascio littorio (literally, bundles of the lictors), was very common in propaganda. Italian fascism derived its name from the fasces, which symbolised imperium, or power and authority, in ancient Rome. Roman legions had carried the aquila, or eagle, as signa militaria.

The Italian tricolour was also used for propaganda. The Italian Social Republic, for example, used it on a poster depicting Goffredo Mameli, the author of the lyrics of Il Canto degli Italiani, the national anthem of Italy from 1946, with an unsheathed sword and a tricolour behind him while he launches towards an assault. This poster bears the words "Brothers of Italy / Italy has woken!" and "1849–1944 The spirit of Goffredo Mameli/Defend the Social Republic".

Flag of the Italian ethnic minority in Yugoslavia

On 25 April 1945, the government of Mussolini fell. This event is commemorated by Liberation Day. With the liberation, the tricolour appeared in public places such as the towers of town halls, on bell towers of churches, and in factories. Remembering these events, Francesco Cossiga, at the time president of the Senate of the Republic, in a speech delivered on 28 June 1984, said:

With the tricolour of Italy the homeland was resurrected and republican democracy was established, which today peacefully unites all Italians. (Note: Con il tricolore d'Italia risorse la Patria e si affermò la democrazia repubblicana che oggi unisce pacificamente gli italiani tutti.)

— Francesco Cossiga

In the eastern Italian territories occupied by the Yugoslav partisan militias, the Italian flag was used with a red star in the centre as a model of the flag used by the partisan Garibaldi Brigades initially in the city of Fiume in 1943, then extended to all the territories where the Italian ethnic minority (Istrian Italians and Dalmatian Italians) resided. Having entered Yugoslavia, this flag remained official until 1992, when it was officially replaced by the flag adopted by the Italian state.

Following the defeat of Italy in World War II and the Paris Treaties of 1947, Istria, Kvarner and most of Julian March, with the cities of Pola, Fiume and Zara, passed to Yugoslavia, and after the latter's dissolution, to Croatia, causing the Istrian-Dalmatian exodus which led to the emigration of between 230,000 and 350,000 of local ethnic Italians (Istrian Italians and Dalmatian Italians), the others being ethnic Slovenians, ethnic Croatians, and ethnic Istro-Romanians, choosing to maintain Italian citizenship. After World War II, Gorizia was divided in two: one part remained with Italy while the other, which was renamed "Nova Gorica", passed first to Yugoslavia and then to Slovenia.

=== Italian Republic ===
The flag of Italian Republic

On 13 June 1946, the Italian Republic was officially founded and the last king of Italy Umberto II, who succeeded his father Victor Emmanuel III on 9 May 1946, left the country on 13 June into exile. On the same day, the tricolour with the Savoy coat of arms in the centre was lowered from the Quirinal Palace. The Italian flag was modified with the decree of the president of the Council of Ministers No. 1 of 19 June 1946. Compared to the monarchic banner, the Savoy coat of arms was eliminated. This decision was later confirmed in the session of 24 March 1947 by the Constituent Assembly, which decreed the insertion of article 12 of the Italian Constitution, subsequently ratified by the Italian Parliament, which states:

[...] The flag of the Republic is the Italian tricolour: green, white, and red, in three vertical bands of equal dimensions. [...]

— Article 12 of Constitution of Italian Republic

The members of the Constituent Assembly were deeply moved when they approved this article, and as a sign of joy and respect, stood up and applauded at length shortly after the approval. Shortly before the officialisation of the flag in the constitution, on 7 January 1947, the tricolour turned 150. The role of master of ceremonies that belonged to Giosuè Carducci 50 years earlier was assumed by Luigi Salvatorelli, whose speech, uttered during the Reggio Emilia official celebrations in the presence of Enrico De Nicola, Provisional Head of State, alluded to the delicate phase that post-war Italy was going through with particular reference to the humiliations suffered by the country in World War II:

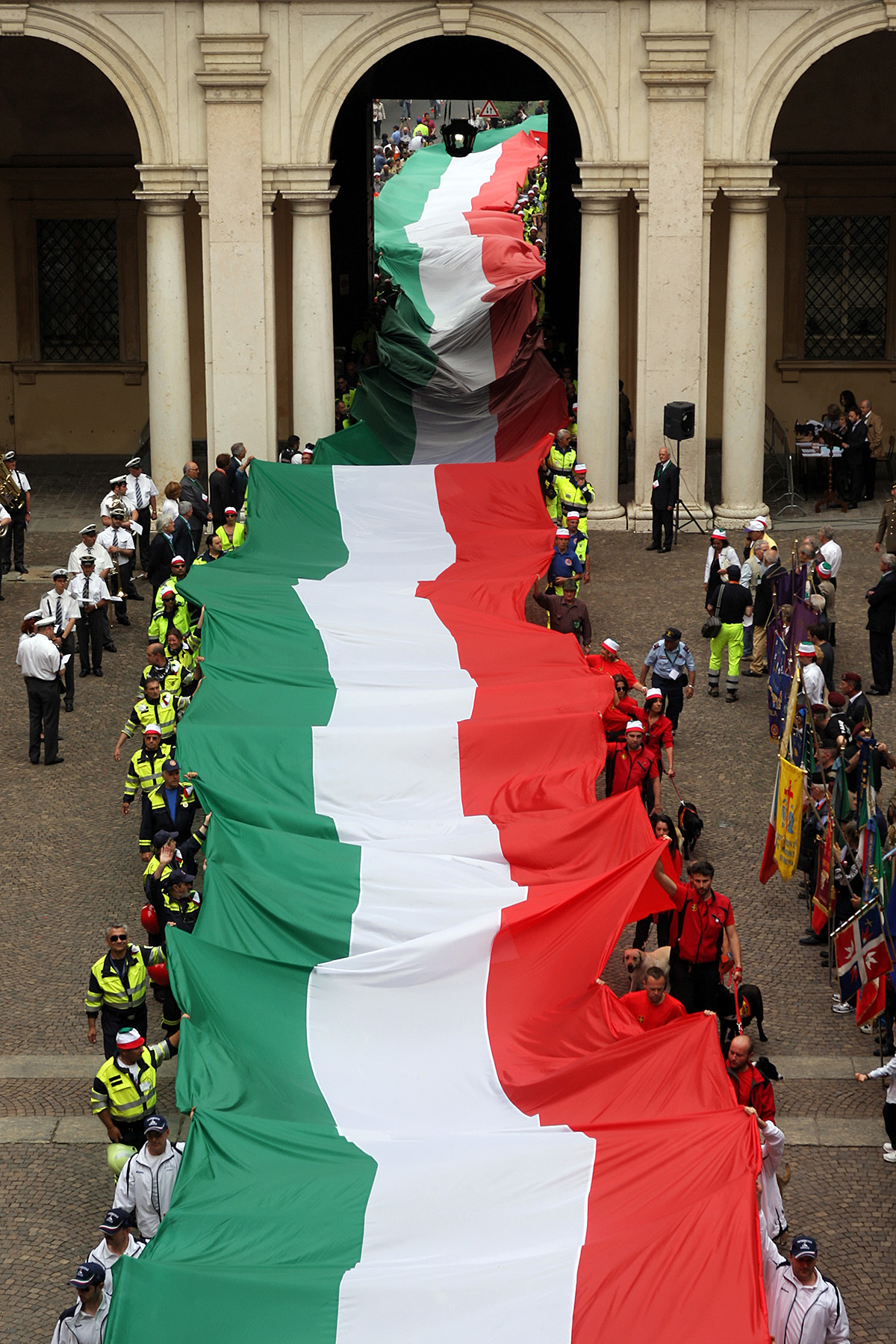
This Italian flag entered the Guinness World Records due to its length.

The tricolour is not lowered, it will not be lowered. It was re-blessed, rededicated by the insurrection of the patriots, by the blood of the partisans and soldiers of Italy fighting against Nazi-fascism in the new liberation struggle. (Note: Il tricolore non è abbassato, non sarà abbassato. Esso è stato ribenedetto, riconsacrato dalla insurrezione dei patrioti, dal sangue dei partigiani e dei soldati d'Italia combattenti contro il nazi-fascismo nella nuova lotta di liberazione.)

— Luigi Salvatorelli

The Republican tricolour was then officially and solemnly delivered to the Italian military corps on 4 November 1947 on the occasion of National Unity and Armed Forces Day. The universally adopted ratio is 2:3, while the war flag is squared (1:1). Each comune also has a gonfalone bearing its coat of arms. On 27 May 1949, a law was passed that described and regulated the way the flag was displayed outside public buildings and during national holidays.

During the republican era, the tricolour greeted important events in Italian history. The flag was hoisted at the top of K2 during the Italian expedition in 1954 that led Achille Compagnoni and Lino Lacedelli to be the first people to reach the summit of this mountain—the second highest in the world after Mount Everest, and was brought in 2011 to the International Space Station by astronaut Roberto Vittori on the occasion of the 150th anniversary of the unification of Italy. A profusion of Italian flags greeted the return of Trieste to Italy in 1954, which took place following the agreements signed between the governments of Italy, the United Kingdom, the United States and Yugoslavia concerning the status of the Free Territory of Trieste, an independent territory situated between northern Italy and Yugoslavia. The territory, under the direct responsibility of the United Nations Security Council in the aftermath of World War II, established on 10 February 1947 by a protocol of the Treaty of Peace with Italy.

The Italian naval ensign comprises the national flag defaced with the arms of the Italian Navy; the mercantile marine (and private citizens at sea) use the civil ensign, differenced by the absence of the mural crown and the lion holding open the gospel, bearing the inscription, PAX TIBI MARCE EVANGELISTA MEVS instead of a sword. The shield is quartered, symbolic of the four great thalassocracies of Italy, the repubbliche marinare of Venice (represented by the lion passant, top left), Genoa (top right), Amalfi (bottom left), and Pisa (represented by their respective crosses); the rostrata crown was proposed by Admiral Cavagnari in 1939 to acknowledge the Navy's origins in ancient Rome.

The tricolour flag was the official banner of the Italian Trust Administration of Somalia (1950–1960), which was granted on a UN mandate, and which was the first peacekeeping mission of the Italian Army. The tricolour continues to represent Italy in all peacekeeping missions in which the Italian Armed Forces participate.

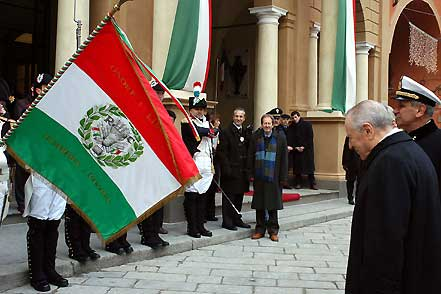
The former president of the Italian Republic, Carlo Azeglio Ciampi, honours the flag of Cispadane Republic, first Italian flag, during the Tricolour Day on 7 January 2004 in Reggio Emilia.

In 1997, on its bicentenary, 7 January was declared Tricolour Day; it is intended as a celebration, though not a public holiday. On 31 December 1996, with the same law that established the Tricolour Day, a celebration held on 7 January of each year in memory of the adoption of the red, white and green flag by the Cispadane Republic (7 January 1797), established a national committee of 20 members that would have the objective of organising the first solemn commemoration of the birth of the Italian flag.

Among the events celebrating the bicentenary of the Italian flag, was the longest tricolour in history, which also entered the Guinness World Records at 7,536 square metres (81,120 ft^{2}) long, 4.8 metres (16 ft) wide and had an area of 7,536 square metres (81,120 ft^{2}), and paraded in Rome from the Colosseum to the Capitoline Hill.

During the celebrations for the 140 years of national unity, on 4 November 2001, in San Martino della Battaglia, during the National Unity and Armed Forces Day, in reference to the tricolour, the former president of the Italian Republic, Carlo Azeglio Ciampi, said:

Let us work to ensure that every family, in every home, there is a tricolour to testify the feelings that have united us since the days of the glorious unification of Italy. The tricolour is not a simple state sign, it is a banner of freedom conquered by a people who recognize themselves as united, who find their identity in the principles of brotherhood, equality, justice. In the values of its own history and civilization. (Note: Adoperiamoci perché ogni famiglia, in ogni casa, ci sia un tricolore a testimoniare i sentimenti che ci uniscono fin dai giorni del glorioso Risorgimento. Il tricolore non è una semplice insegna di Stato, è un vessillo di libertà conquistata da un popolo che si riconosce unito, che trova la sua identità nei principi di fratellanza, di eguaglianza, di giustizia. Nei valori della propria storia e della propria civiltà.)

— Carlo Azeglio Ciampi

In 2003, a state ensign was created specifically for non-military vessels engaged in non-commercial government service whereby the Italian tricolour is defaced with the national coat of arms. Since 1914, the Italian Air Force have also used a roundel of concentric rings in the colours of the tricolour as aircraft marking, substituted, from 1923 to 1943, by encircled fasces. The Frecce Tricolori, officially known as the 313º Gruppo Addestramento Acrobatico, is its aerobatic demonstration team.

The law n. 222 of 23 November 2012, concerning "Rules on the acquisition of knowledge and skills in the field of" Citizenship and Constitution "and on the teaching of the Mameli hymn in schools", prescribes the study in schools of the Italian flag and other national symbols of Italy.

== Historical evolution of the flag ==
Flag of the Cispadane Republic (1797)

Flag of the Cisalpine Republic (1797–1798)

Flag of the Cisalpine Republic (1798–1802)

Flag of the Italian Republic (1802–1805)

Flag of the Kingdom of Italy (1805–1814)

Flag of the Italian United Provinces (1831)

Flag of the Kingdom of the Two Sicilies (1848–1849)

Flag of the Republic of San Marco (1848–1849)

Flag of the Kingdom of Piedmont-Sardinia (1848–1851)

Flag of the Kingdom of Sicily (1848–1849)

Flag of the Grand Duchy of Tuscany (1848–1849)

Flag of the Roman Republic (1849)

War flag of the Roman Republic (1849)

Flag of the Free Cities of Menton and Roquebrune (1848–1849)

Flag of the Kingdom of Piedmont-Sardinia (1851–1861)

Flag of the United Provinces of Central Italy (1859–1860)

Flag of the Kingdom of the Two Sicilies (1860–1861)

State flag of the Kingdom of Italy (1861–1946)

Civil flag of the Kingdom of Italy. Merchant flag in the period (1861–1946)

Flag of the Colonna Italiana (1936–1945)

Flag of the Italian Social Republic (1943–1945)

Flag of the National Republican Army (1 December 1943 to 7 May 1945)

War flag of the Italian Social Republic (28 January 1944 to 7 May 1945)

Flag of the National Liberation Committee (1943–1945)

Flag of the Brigate Garibaldi (1943–1945)

Flag of the Italian ethnic minority (Istrian Italians and Dalmatian Italians) in Yugoslavia (1945–1990)

Flag of the Trust Territory of Somaliland (1950–1960)

Flag of Italians of Croatia (1990–present)

Flag of the Italian Republic (1946–2003)

Flag of the Italian Republic (2003–2006)

Flag of the Italian Republic (2006–present)

== Description ==
=== Colours ===
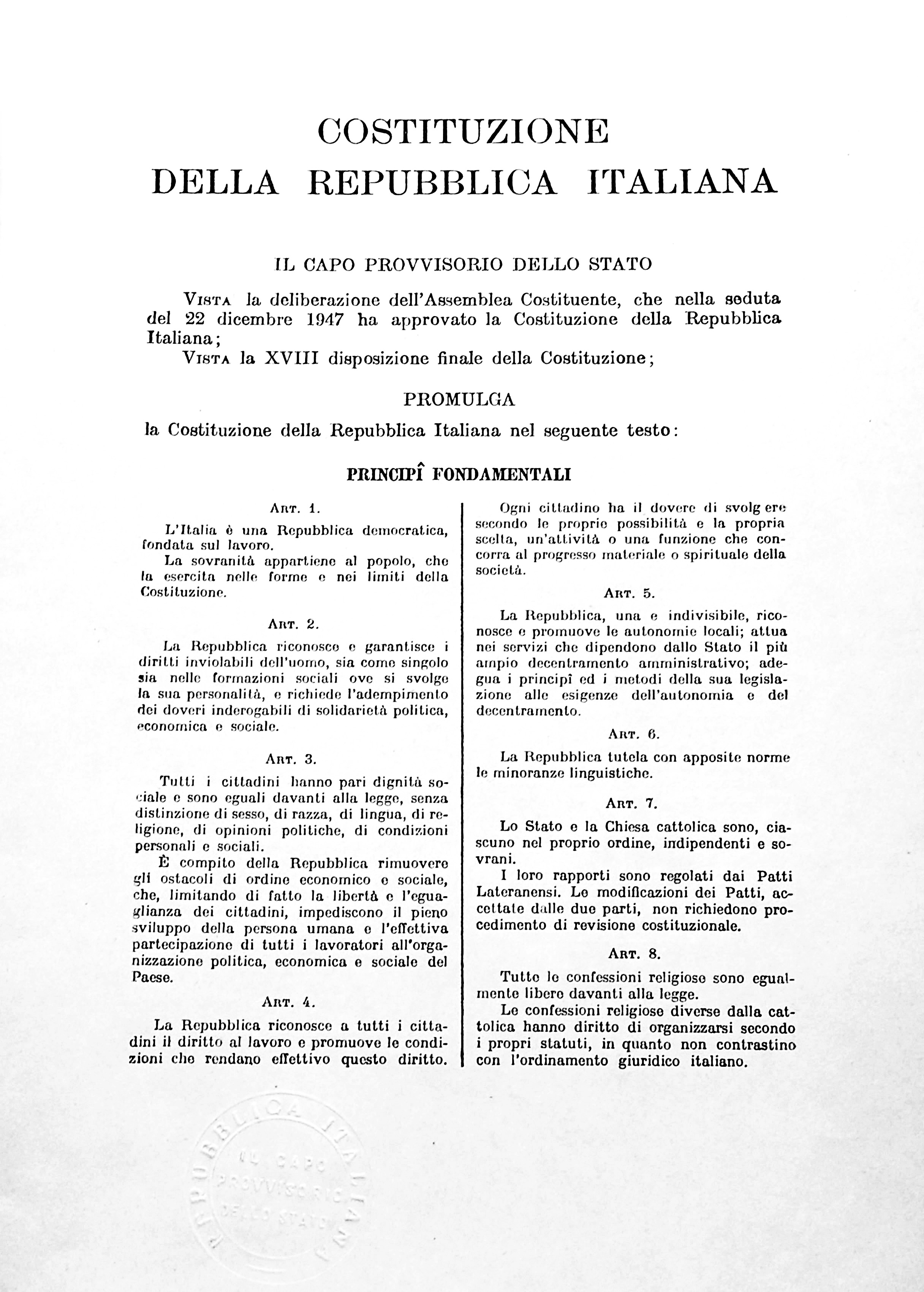
One of three original copies of Constitution of the Italian Republic, now in the custody of Historical Archives of the president of the Italian Republic

The colours of the Italian flag are indicated in article 12 of the Constitution of the Italian Republic, published in the Gazzetta Ufficiale No. 298, extraordinary edition, of 27 December 1947, and came into force on 1 January 1948:

- green;
- white;
- red.

If the flag is exposed horizontally, the green part should be placed at the hoist side, with the white one in a central position and the red one outside, while if the banner is exposed vertically the green section should be placed above.

=== Chromatic definition ===
The Italian flag, using the 2003 to 2006 colours

The Italian flag, using the 2006 colours

The need to precisely define the colours was born from an event that happened at the Justus Lipsius building, seat of the Council of the European Union, of the European Council and of their Secretariat, when an Italian MEP, in 2002, noticed that the colours of the Italian flag were unrecognisable with red, for example, which had a shade that turned towards orange. For this reason the government, following the report of this MEP, decided to specifically define the colours of the Italian national flag.

The shades of green, white and red were first specified by these official documents:

- circulaire of the Undersecretary of State for the Presidency of the Council of Ministers of 18 September 2002;
- circulaire by the State Secretary for the Presidency of the Council of Ministers of 17 January 2003;
  - green: Pantone tessile 18-5642TC (Golf Green), called in the text "bright green grass";
  - white: Pantone tessile 11-4201TC (Cloud Dancer), called in the text "milky white";
  - red: Pantone tessile 18-1660TC (Tomato), called in the text "red tomato".

New documents then replaced the previous ones:

- circulaire of the Presidency of the Council of Ministers No. EU 3.3.1 / 14545/1 of 2 June 2004;
- decree of the President of the Council of Ministers of 14 April 2006, "General provisions relating to ceremonial and precedence among public offices"
  - green: Pantone tessile 17-6153 TCX (Fern Green);
  - white: Pantone tessile 11-0601 TCX (Bright White);
  - red: Pantone tessile 18-1662 TCX (Scarlet Red).

The chromatic tones of the three colours, on polyester stamina, are enshrined in paragraph 1 of article n. 31 "Colour definition of the colours of the flag of the Republic", of Section V "Flag of Republic, National Anthem, National Feasts and State Funeral", of Chapter II "General provisions relating to ceremonial", of the annex "Presidency of the Council of Ministers – State Ceremonial Department", to the decree of the president of the Council of Ministers of 14 April 2006 "General provisions on ceremonial and precedence between public offices", published in the Gazzetta Ufficiale No. 174 of 28 July 2006.

Description	Number	RGB	CMYK	HSV	Hex
Fern Green	17-6153 TC	0, 140, 69	100%, 0%, 51%, 45%	150°, 100%, 55%	#008C45
Bright White	11-0601 TC	244, 245, 240	0%, 0%, 2%, 4%	72°, 2%, 96%	#F4F5F0
Flame Scarlet	18-1662 TC	205, 33, 42	0%, 84%, 80%, 20%	357°, 84%, 80%	#CD212A

== Other official flags ==
=== Governmental standards ===
Standard of the President of the Italian Republic, modified in 2000

The president of the Italian Republic has an official standard. The current version is based on the square flag of the Napoleonic Italian Republic, on a field of blue, charged with the emblem of Italy in gold. The square shape with a Savoy blue border symbolise the four Italian Armed Forces, namely the Italian Air Force, the Carabinieri, the Italian Army and the Italian Navy, of which the president is the commander. Blue in heraldry also metaphorically symbolises command.

The first version of the standard, adopted in 1965 and used until 1990 was very similar to the current version only without the red, white and green. The emblem was also much larger. This version of the standard was replaced in 1990 by then President Francesco Cossiga. Cossiga's new version of the standard contained the same royal blue background but now with a squared Italian national flag in the centre and no emblem. This version was short-lived as only two years later it was replaced by the 1965 standard, only with a smaller emblem. This version lasted until 2000 from when it was replaced by the current version.

After the Republic was proclaimed, the national flag was provisionally adopted as the head of state in place of the royal standard. On the initiative of the Ministry of Defence, a project was prepared in 1965 to adopt a distinct flag. Opportunity suggested the most natural solution was the Italian tricolour defaced with the coat of arms—but under conditions of poor visibility, this could easily be mistaken for the standard of the president of Mexico, which is also that country's national flag. The standard is kept in the custody of the Commander of the Reggimento Corazzieri of the Arma dei Carabinieri, along with the war flag (assigned to Regiment in 1878).

A separate insignia for the president of the Senate, in exercise of duties as acting head of state under Article 86, was created in 1986. This has a white square on the blue field, charged with the arms of the Republic in silver. Distinguishing insignia for former presidents of the Republic was created in 2001; a tricolour in the style of the presidential standard, it is emblazoned with the Cypher of Honour of the president of the Republic.

The standard of president of the Council of Ministers of Italy, introduced for the first time in 1927 by Benito Mussolini, in its first form a littorio beam appeared in the middle of the drape. The sign was abolished in 1943, while the current one was defined in 2008 by Silvio Berlusconi. It consists of a blue drapery bordered by two gold-coloured borders in the centre of which stands the emblem of the Republic. The banner should be exposed to every official engagement of the president and on the vehicles that carry it, but it is almost never used. The main colours are blue and gold, which have always been considered colours linked to the command.

Standard of a substitute president of the Italian Republic

Standard of a president emeritus of the Italian Republic

Standard of the president of the Council of Ministers of Italy

Standard of the Minister of Defence

=== Maritime flags ===
The naval ensigns are defaced to distinguish themselves from the flag of Mexico:

- the naval ensign bears the arms of the Navy: a shield, surmounted by a turreted and rostrum crown, which brings together in four parts the arms of four ancient maritime republics: Republic of Venice (where the Lion of Saint Mark carries the sword), Republic of Genoa, Republic of Pisa and Republic of Amalfi;
- the civil ensign bears a coat of arms identical to that of the Navy, but without a crown and in which the lion of Saint Mark carries the book;
- the government ensign, adopted in 2003, bears the emblem of the Italian Republic.
Jack of the (former) Regia Marina

Italian civil ensign

Italian government ensign

Italian naval ensign

Italian naval jack (recto)

== Protocol ==
=== Obligation to exhibit ===
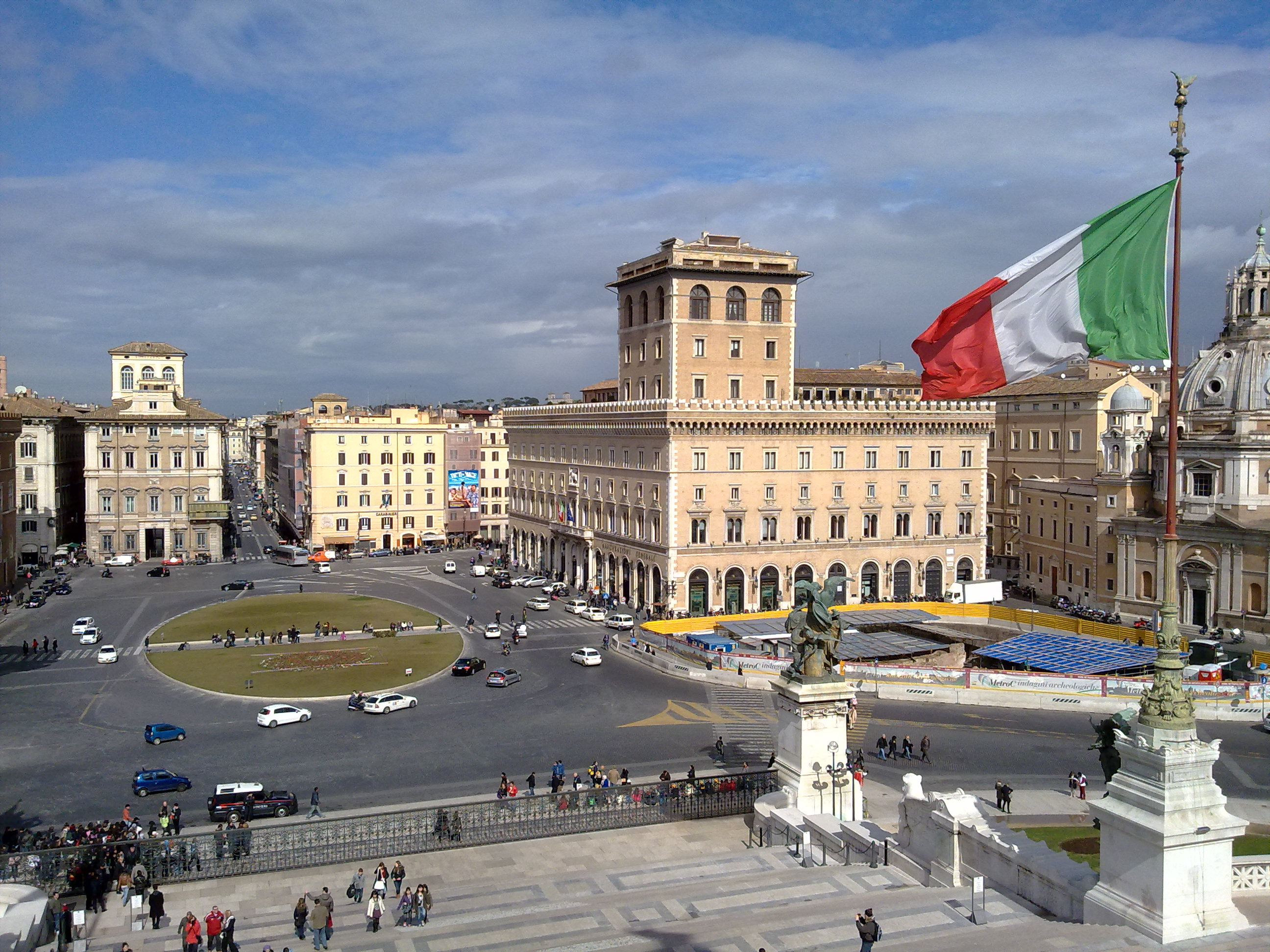
The Italian flag flying at the Altare della Patria, Piazza Venezia, Rome

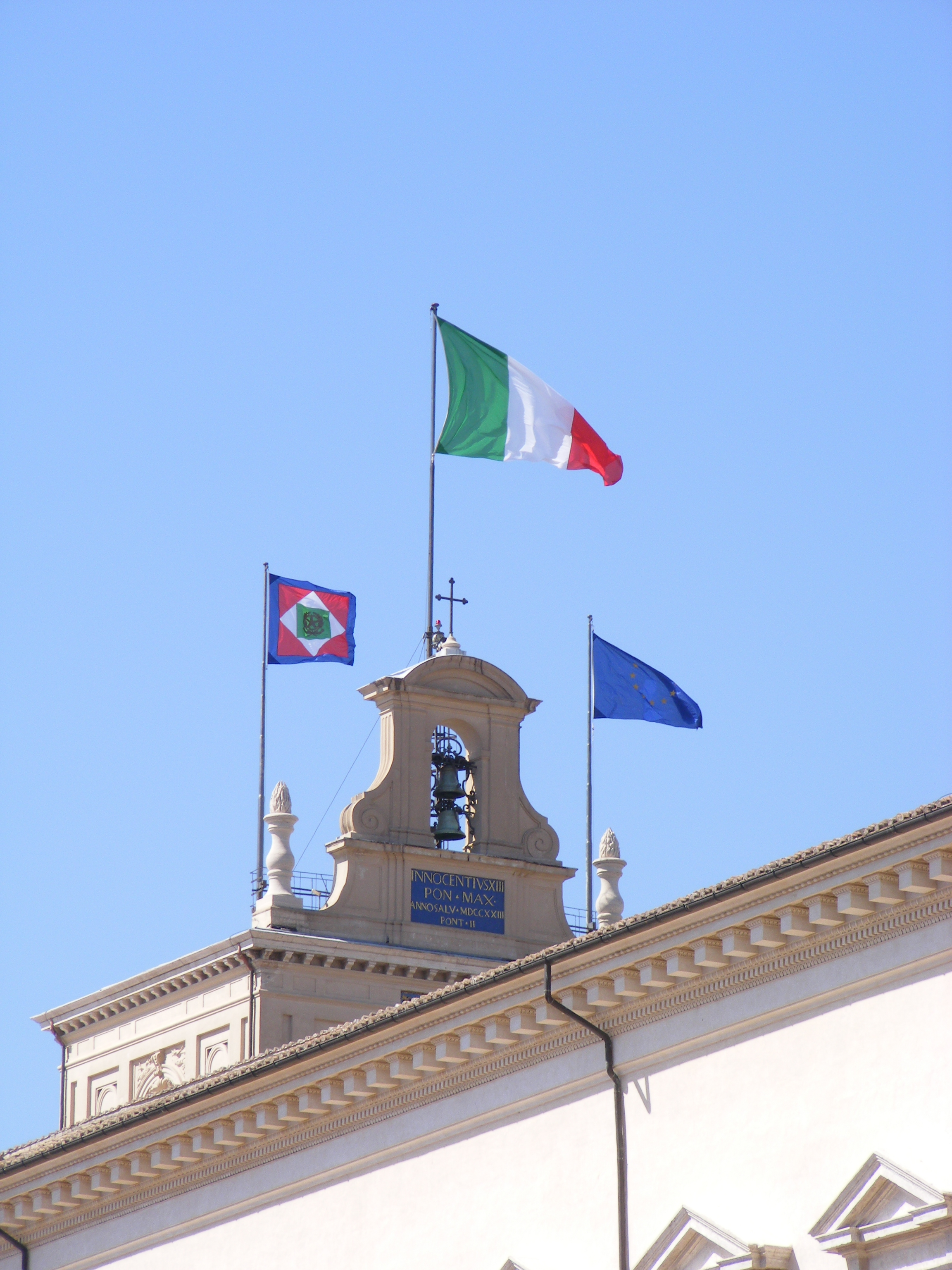
The Italian flag flying on the top of the Quirinal Palace, Rome, the main official residence of the President of the Italian Republic. From left to right, the presidential standard of Italy, the flag of Italy and the flag of the European Union.

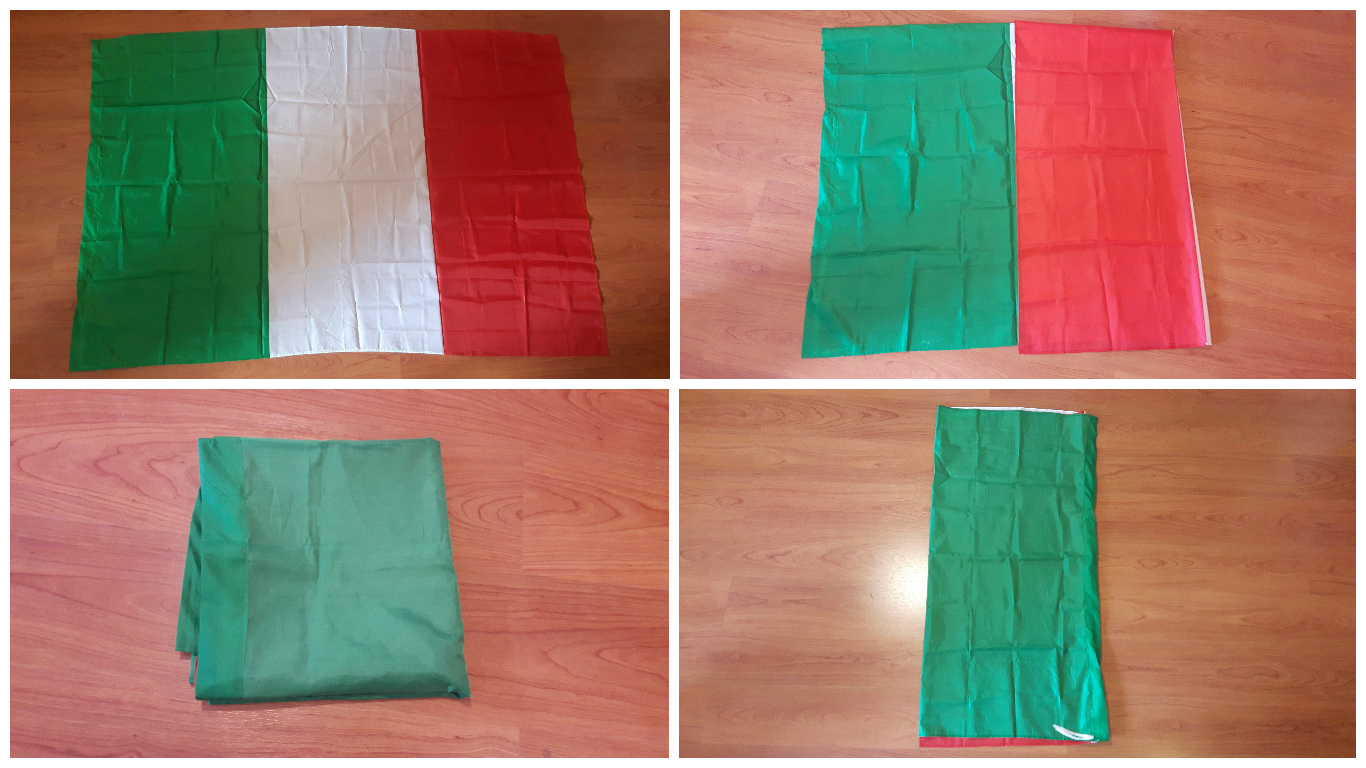
From above, clockwise, image showing how to fold the Italian flag correctly

The law, implementing Article 12 of the Constitution and following of Italy's membership of the European Union, lays down the general provisions governing the use and display of the flag of the Italian Republic and the flag of European Union (in its territory). In particular, in public buildings the flag of the Italian Republic, the flag of the European Union and the portrait of the president of the Italian Republic must be displayed in the offices of the most important Italian institutional offices.

The flag of Italy must also be displayed outside all schools of all levels, outside university complexes, outside the buildings that host the voting operations, outside the prefectures, police headquarters, palaces of justice and outside the central post offices. The flag of Italy must also be displayed on all public offices on the Tricolour Day (7 January), the Anniversary of the Lateran Treaty (11 February), the Anniversary of the Liberation (25 April), the Labour Day (1 May), the Europe Day (9 May), the Feast of the Italian Republic (2 June), the commemoration of the Four days of Naples (28 September), the feast of the patron saint of Italy (Francis of Assisi, 4 October), United Nations Day (24 October; here the tricolour must fly together with the flag of the United Nations) and National Unity and Armed Forces Day (4 November).

When displayed alongside other flags, the flag of Italy takes the position of honour; it is raised first and lowered last. Other national flags should be arranged in alphabetical order. Where two (or more than three) flags appear together, the national flag should be placed to the right (left of the observer); in a display of three flags in line, the national flag occupies the central position. The European flag is also flown from government buildings on a daily basis. In the presence of a foreign visitor belonging to a member state, this takes precedence over the Italian flag. As a sign of mourning, flags flown externally shall be lowered to half-mast; two black ribbons may be attached to those otherwise displayed.

=== Exposure mode ===
The tricolour flags displayed must always be in excellent condition, fully extended and must never touch water or land. In no case can figures and writings be written or printed on the cloth. Furthermore, the Italian flag can never be used as a simple drapery or as a fabric in common use (e.g. to cover tables or as curtains).

In the event of public mourning the banner can be raised at half-mast and two strips of black velvet can be affixed to the cloth; the latter are instead mandatory when the tricolour participates in funeral ceremonies. In public ceremonies, the tricolour must always parade first.

=== Flag-folding ===
There is a precise way to fold the tricolour correctly, by taking into account the three vertical bands of which the banner is composed.

The flag must be folded according to the boundaries of the colour bands: first the red band and then the green band must be folded over the white one in order to leave only the latter two colours visible; only subsequently should it be folded further in order to completely cover the red and white with green—the only colour that must be visible at the time of the closure of the cloth.

=== Legal protection ===
Article 292 of the Italian Penal Code ("Insult or damage to the flag or other emblem of the State") protects the Italian flag by providing for the crime of insulting it, or other banners bearing the national colours, thus providing:

Anyone who vilifies the national flag or another emblem of the State with insulting expressions is punished with a fine ranging from €1,000 to €5,000. The penalty is increased from €5,000 to €10,000 if the same act is committed in occasion of a public occasion or an official ceremony.

Anyone who publicly and intentionally destroys, disperses, deteriorates, renders useless or smears the national flag or another emblem of the state is punished with imprisonment for up to two years.

For the purposes of criminal law, the national flag means the official flag of the state and any other flag bearing the national colours. (Note: Chiunque vilipende con espressioni ingiuriose la bandiera nazionale o un altro emblema dello Stato è punito con la multa da euro 1 000 a euro 5 000. La pena è aumentata da euro 5 000 a euro 10 000 nel caso in cui il medesimo fatto sia commesso in occasione di una pubblica ricorrenza o di una cerimonia ufficiale. Chiunque pubblicamente e intenzionalmente distrugge, disperde, deteriora, rende inservibile o imbratta la bandiera nazionale o un altro emblema dello Stato è punito con la reclusione fino a due anni. Agli effetti della legge penale per bandiera nazionale si intende la bandiera ufficiale dello Stato e ogni altra bandiera portante i colori nazionali.)

— Art. 292 of the Italian penal code

== Flag-raising ==
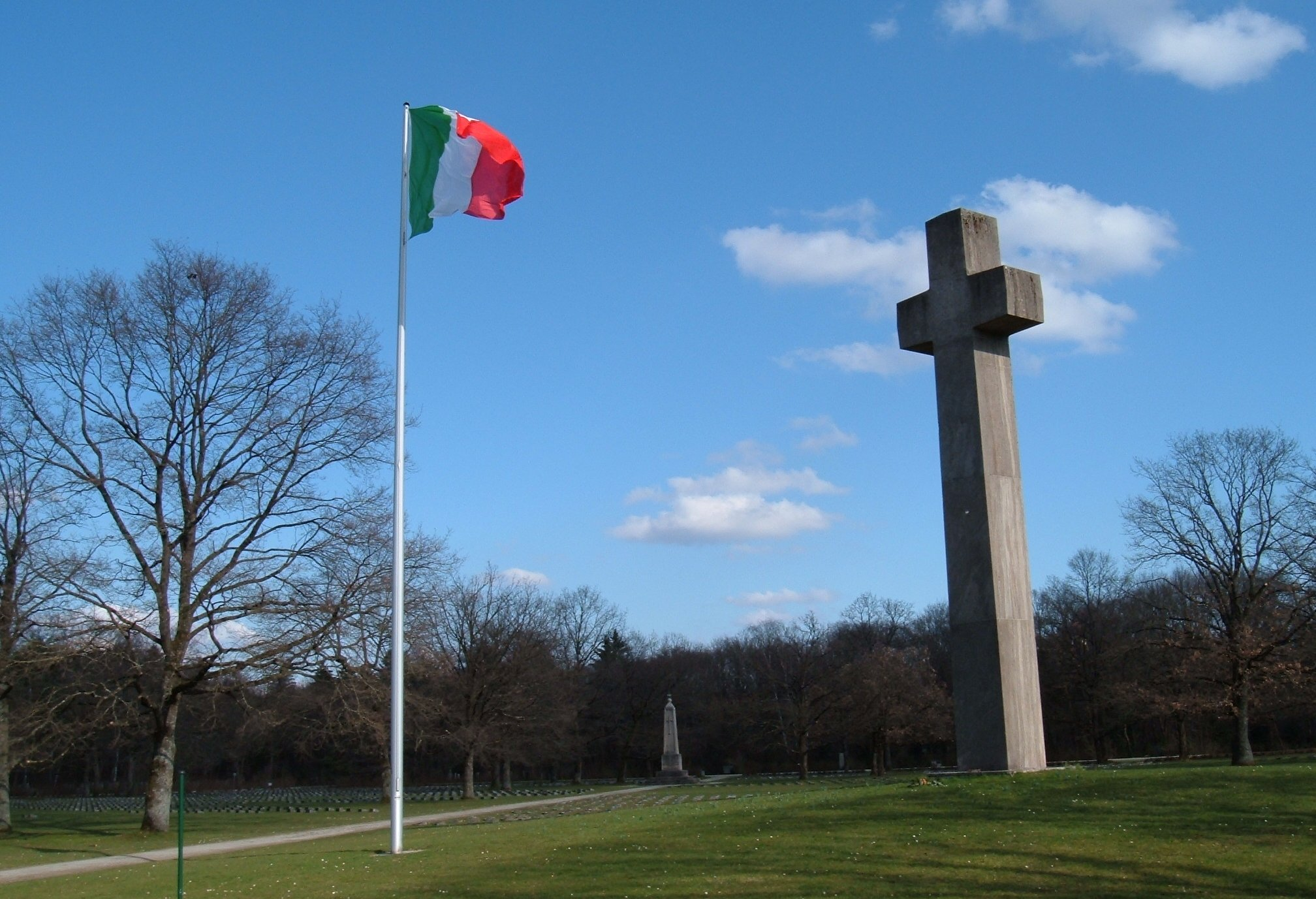
Flag waving at an Italian war grave in Munich, Germany

The flag-raising of the tricolour takes place at the first light of dawn, with the flag which is made to slide quickly and resolutely up to the end of the flagpole. In the military sphere, it is announced by trumpet blasts and is performed on the notes of the national anthem.

The flagship, which takes place in the evening, is instead slower and more solemn so as not to make it seem a rapid lowering. The tricolour can be exposed also during the night only if the place where it is flying is conveniently illuminated.

In the presence of other flags, as well as receiving the most important honour position, it must be hoisted first and lowered last.

== Meaning of the Colours of the Flag ==
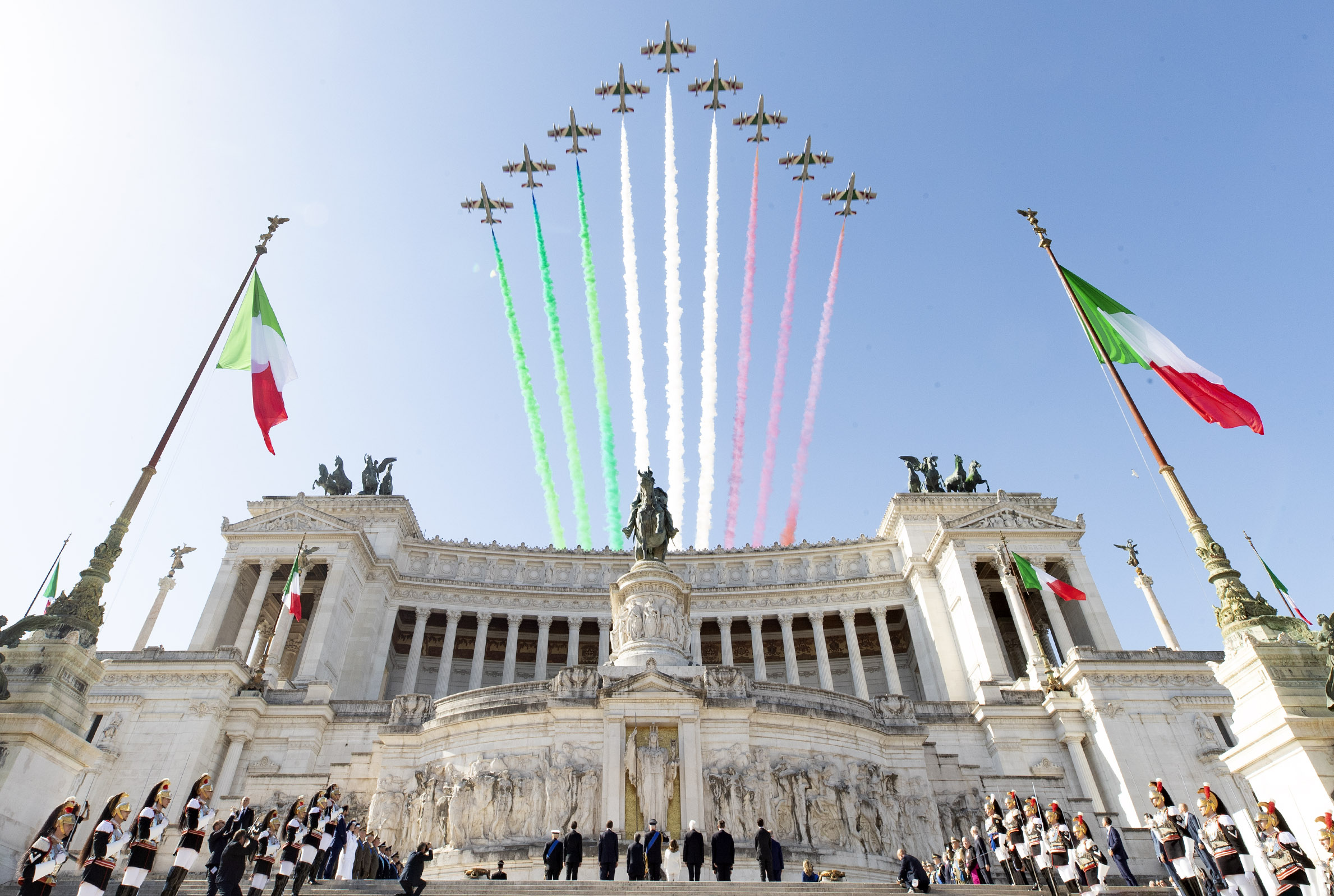
The Frecce Tricolori, with green, white, and red smoke trails, above the Altare della Patria in Rome

As the similarity suggests, the Italian tricolour derives from the flag of France, which was born during the French Revolution from the union of white – the colour of the monarchy – with red and blue – the colours of Paris, and which became the symbol of social and political renewal perpetrated by the original Jacobinism.

Green, the first Italian tricolour cockades, symbolised natural rights, namely social equality and freedom. After various events it came to 7 January 1797, the date of the adoption of the tricolour flag by the Cispadane Republic, the first Italian sovereign state to make use of it. During the Napoleonic period, the three colours acquired a more idealistic meaning for the population: the green represents hope, the white represents faith and the red represents love.

Other less probable conjectures that explain the adoption of the green hypothesise a tribute that Napoleon wanted to give to Corsica, where he was born, or to a possible reference to the verdant Italian landscape. For the adoption of greenery there is also the so-called "Masonic hypothesis": even for Freemasonry, green was the colour of nature, a symbol of human rights, which are naturally inherent in the human being, as much as of the florid Italian landscape. This interpretation is opposed by those who maintain that Freemasonry, as a secret society, did not have such an influence at the time that inspired Italian national colours.

Another hypothesis that attempts to explain the meaning of the three Italian national colours would, without historical bases, be that the green is linked to the colour of the meadows and the Mediterranean maquis, the white to that of the snows of the Alps and the red to the blood spilt in the Wars of Italian Independence and Unification.

A more religious and philosophical interpretation is that green represents hope, white represents faith, and red represents charity (love), in reference to the three theological virtues.

== Tricolour Day ==
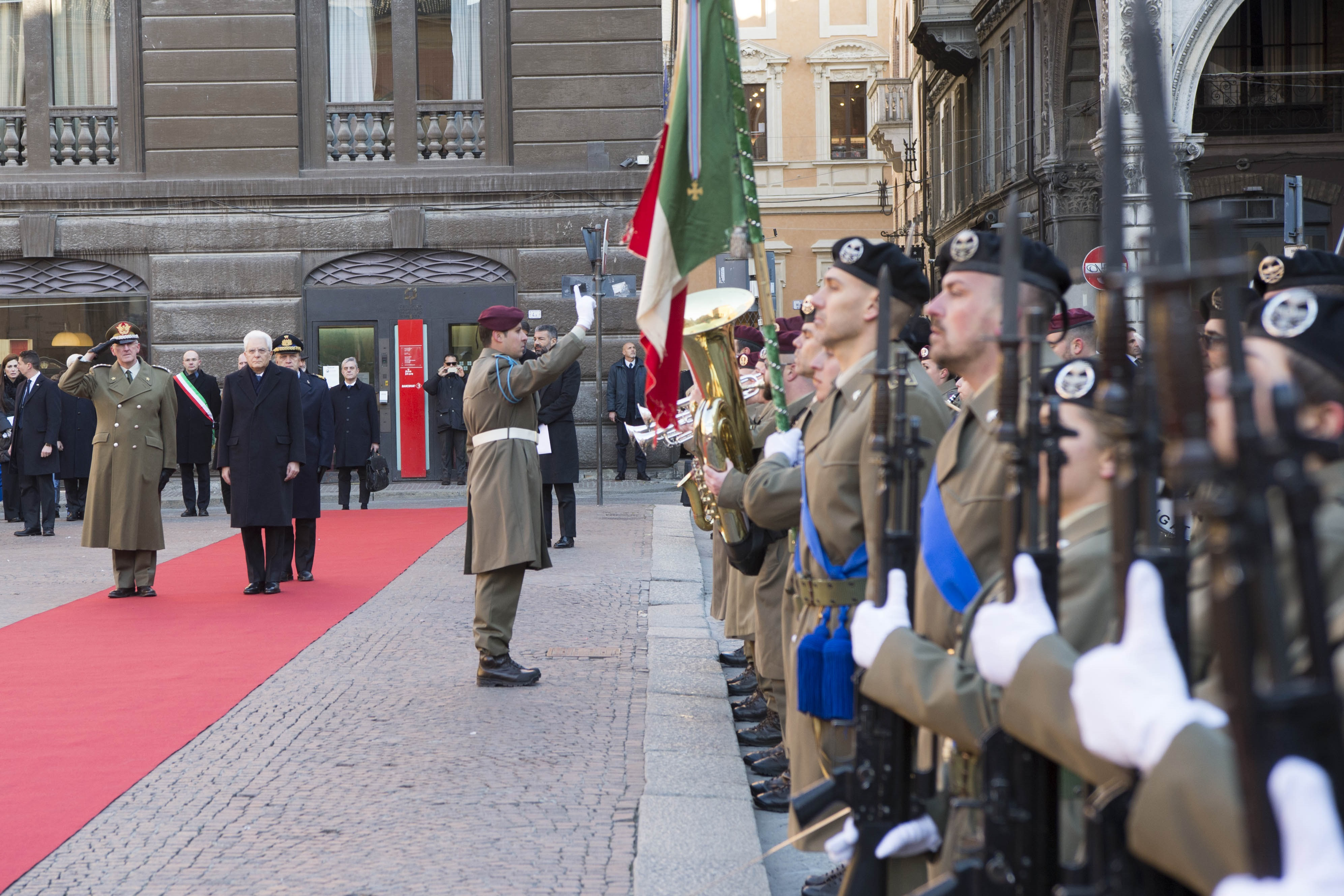
The president of Italy, Sergio Mattarella, during his entry into the Sala del Tricolore on the occasion of the Tricolour Day on 7 January 2017

To commemorate the birth of the Italian flag, the Tricolour Day was established on 31 December 1996, which is known in Italian as the Festa del Tricolore. It is celebrated every year on 7 January, with the official celebrations being organised in Reggio nell'Emilia, the city where the first official adoption of the tricolour was declared as a national flag by an Italian sovereign state, the Cispadane Republic, which took place on 7 January 1797.

In Reggio nell'Emilia, the Festa del Tricolore is celebrated in Piazza Prampolini, in front of the town hall, in the presence of one of the highest offices of the Italian Republic (the president of the Italian Republic or the president of one of the chambers), who attends the flag-raising on the notes of Il Canto degli Italiani and which renders military honours a reproduction of the flag of the Cispadane Republic.

In Rome, at the Quirinal Palace, the ceremonial foresees instead the change of the Guard of honour in solemn form with the deployment and the parade of the Corazzieri Regiment in gala uniform and the Fanfare of the Carabinieri Cavalry Regiment. This solemn rite is carried out only on three other occasions, during the anniversary of the unification of Italy (17 March), the Festa della Repubblica (2 June) and the National Unity and Armed Forces Day (4 November).

== The flag in museums ==
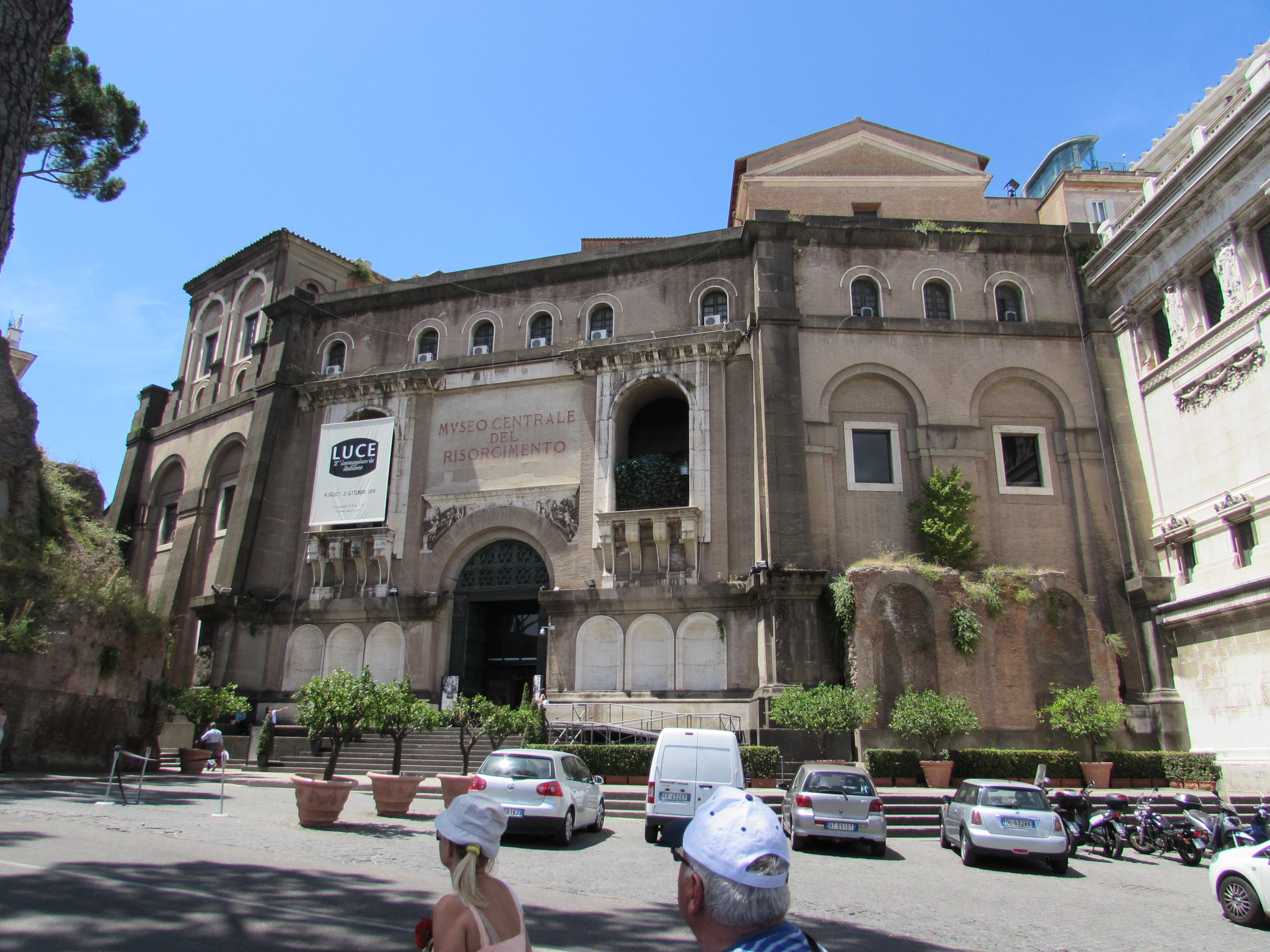
The Central Museum of the Risorgimento at Vittoriano, located in Rome

There are many museums that host at least one historic Italian flag. Located throughout the Italian Peninsula, they are mainly located in northern Italy.

The most important exhibition space that hosts Italian tricolour flags is found in the architectural complex of the Altare della Patria in Rome. Inside the "Central Museum of the Risorgimento at the Vittoriano", there are about 700 historical flags belonging to the Italian Army, Italian Navy and Italian Air Force departments, as well as the tricolour flag with which it was wrapped in 1921 coffin of the Unknown Soldier on his journey to the Altar of the Patria. The oldest tricolour preserved in the Central Museum of the Risorgimento dates back to 1860: it is one of the original tricolours that flew on the Lombardo steamship which, together with Piedmont steamship, participated in the expedition of the Thousand. The Vittoriano also houses the Flag Memorial (Sacrario delle Bandiere), the museum that collects and preserves disused Italian war flags.

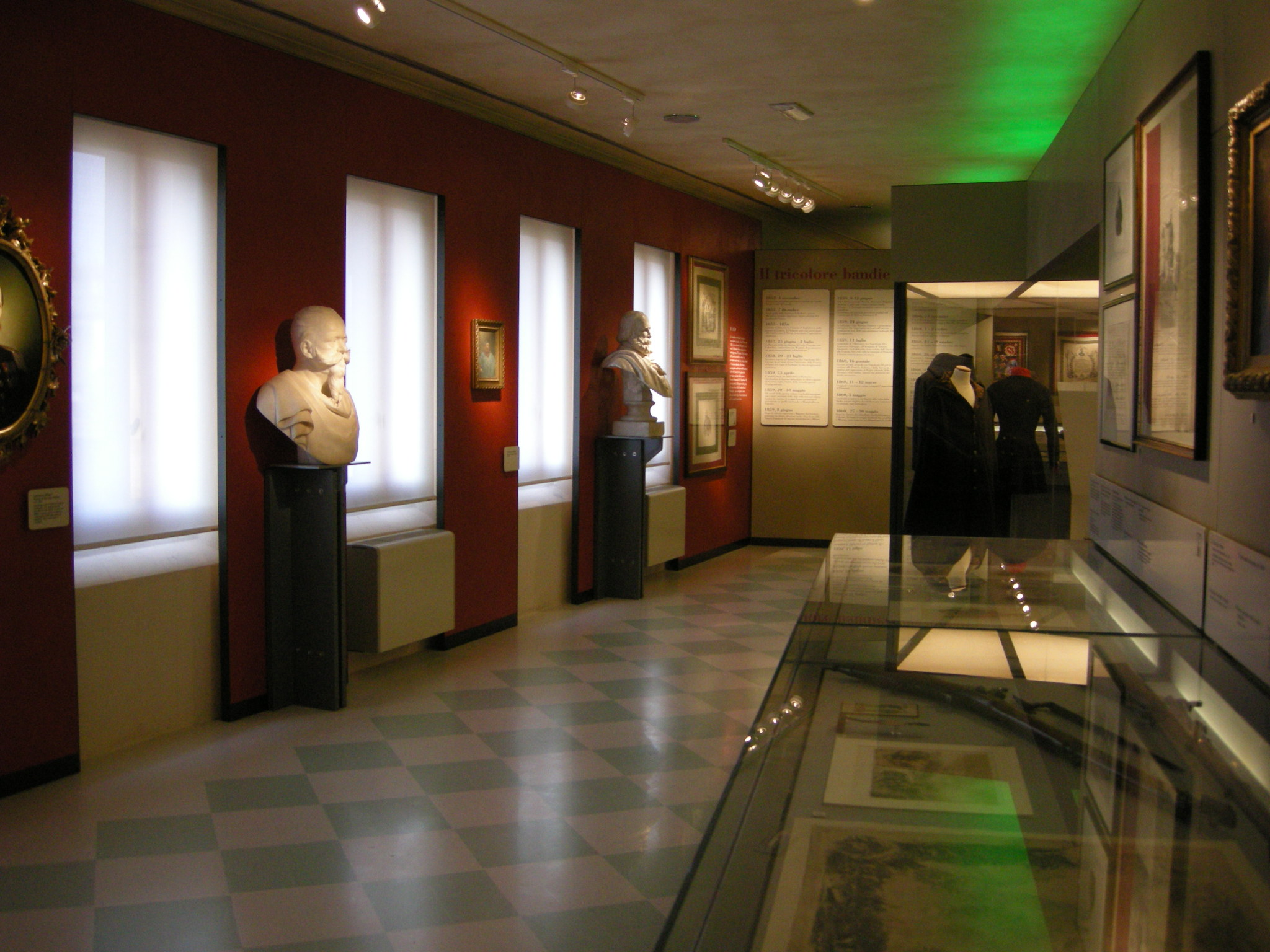
Interior of the Tricolour Flag Museum in Reggio Emilia, the city that saw the birth of the Italian flag in 1797

Other exhibition spaces that also host historical tricolour flags in Rome include, the Historical Museum of the Carabinieri, the Historical Museum of the Bersaglieri, the Historical Museum of the Infantry, the Historical Museum of the Sardinian Grenadiers, the Historical Museum of the Military engineering, the Historical Museum of the Guardia di Finanza and the Historical Museum of Military Motorization.

The Tricolour Flag Museum in Reggio nell'Emilia, the city that saw the birth of the Italian flag in 1797, was founded in 2004. It is located within the town hall of the Emilian city, adjacent to the Sala del Tricolore where documents and memorabilia attributable to the period between the arrival of Napoleon Bonaparte in Reggio (1796) and 1897, the year of the first centenary of the Italian flag are kept.

Other exhibition spaces that also host historical tricolour flags in Emilia-Romagna are the Museum of the Risorgimento and of the Resistance in Ferrara, the Civic Museum of the Risorgimento in Modena, the Museum of the Resistance in Montefiorino, the Civic Museum of the Risorgimento in Bologna, the Museum of the Risorgimento in Imola and the Museum of the Risorgimento in Piacenza.

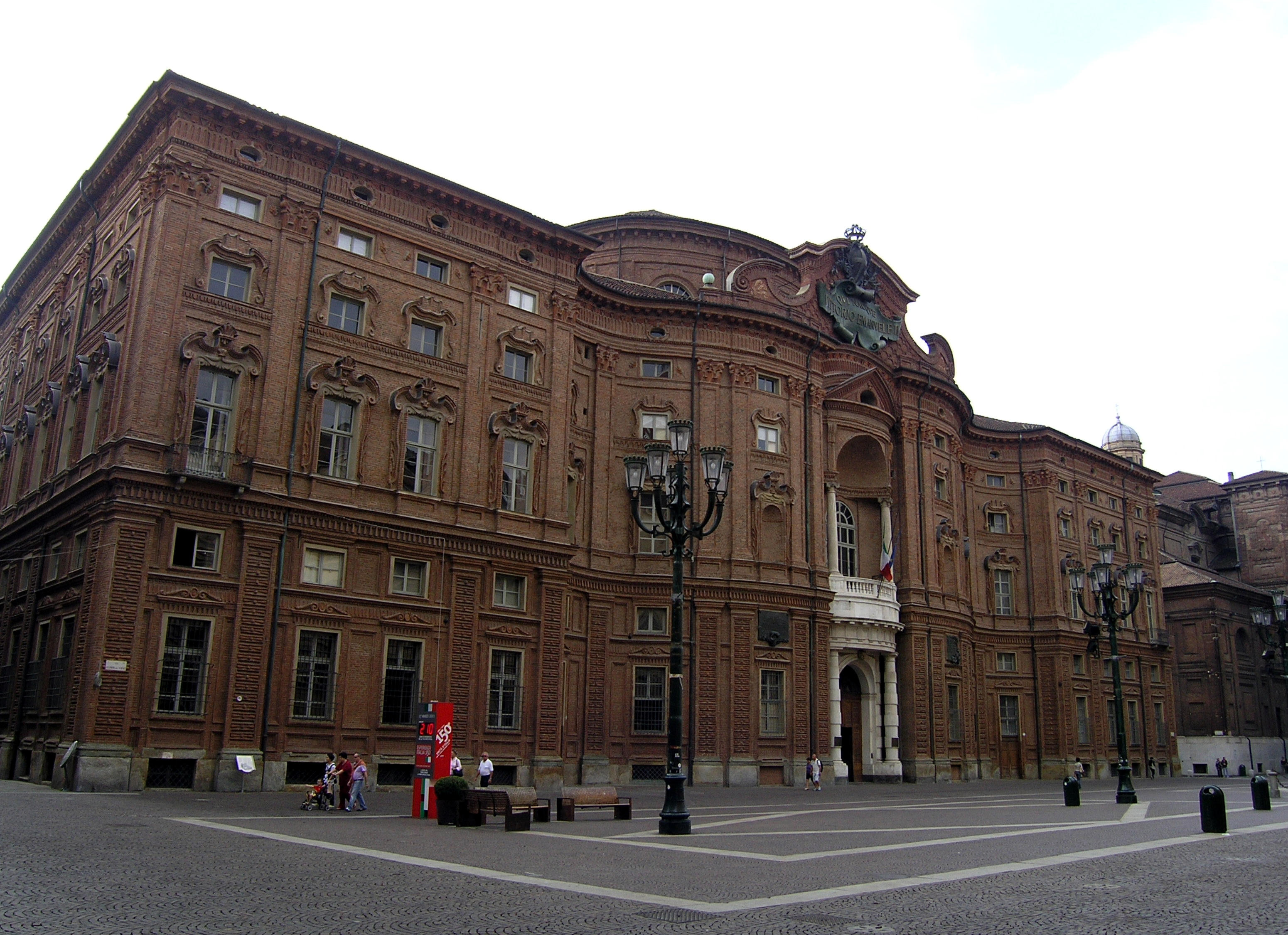
The National Museum of the Italian Risorgimento in Turin

The National Museum of the Italian Risorgimento in Turin, the only one of Risorgimento that officially has the title of "national", house a rich collection of tricolours, including some dating back to the revolutions of 1848. Among the relics of the Royal Armory of Turin there is a flag of 1855, a relic in the Crimean War, in which the Russian Empire lost to an alliance of the Ottoman Empire, France, Britain and Kingdom of Piedmont-Sardinia. In Piedmont, there are also other museums that host Italian flags in their collections: the National Historical Museum of Artillery in Turin, the Historical Museum of the Cavalry in Pinerolo and the Badogliano Historical Museum in Grazzano Badoglio.

In Liguria, there is the Museum of the Risorgimento and Mazzinian Institute in Genoa which preserves, among other things, an original flag of the Young Italy, while in La Spezia there is the Naval Technical Museum of the Navy, founded in the 15th century by Amadeus VIII, Duke of Savoy.

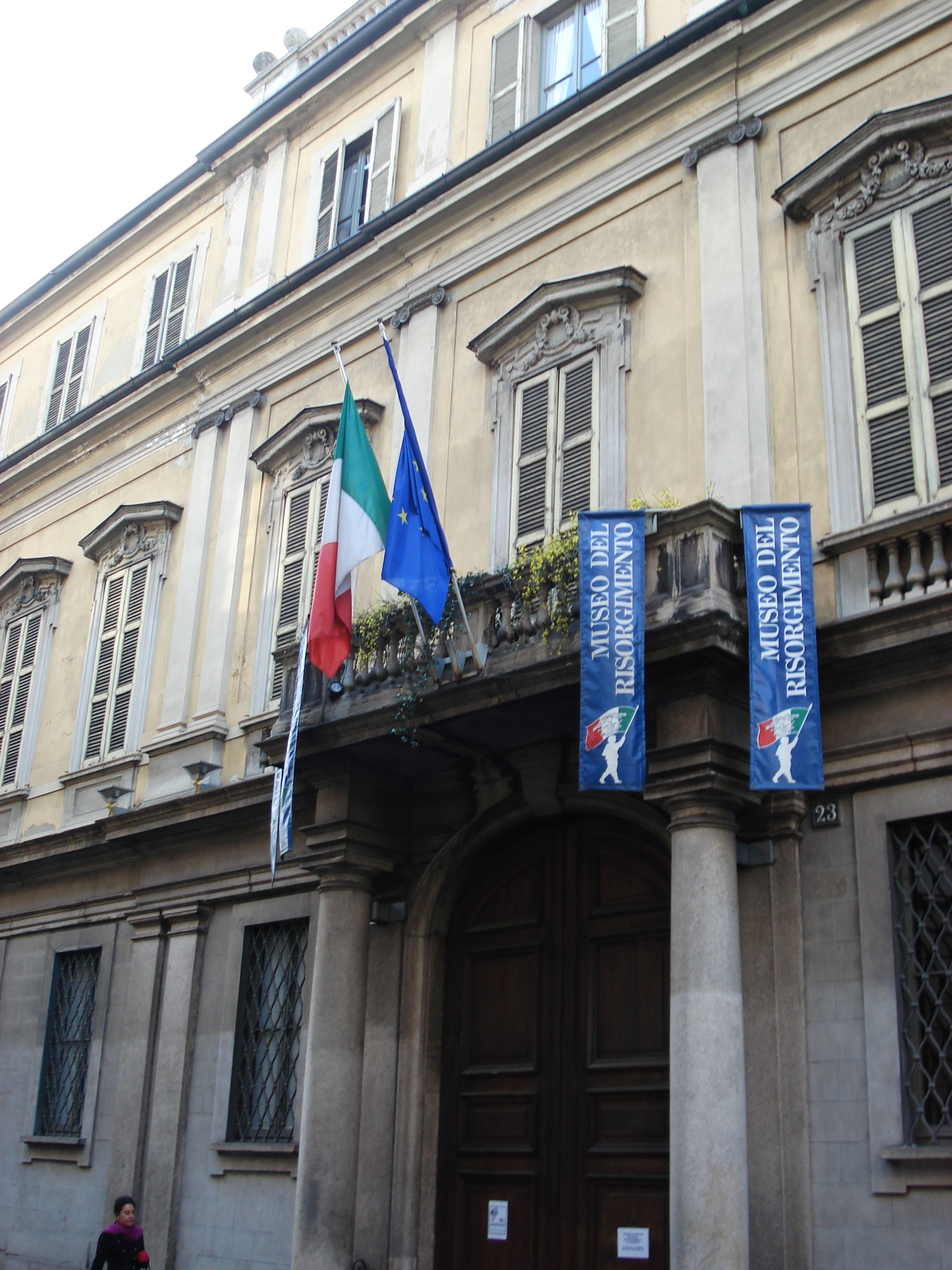
The Museum of the Risorgimento in Milan

The Museum of the Risorgimento in Milan houses several tricolours from the Napoleonic era, including a flag of the Lombard Legion dating back to 1797 and delivered to the cohort of hunters on horseback only after the aforementioned ceremony in Piazza del Duomo, Milan, on 6 November 1796. Inside the Milanese museum there is also the tricolour flag dating back to the Five Days of Milan that flew from the Milan Cathedral on 20 March 1848.

Near Mantua, in Solferino, is the Museum of the Risorgimento of Solferino and San Martino, which celebrates the 1859 military battle of the same name and which houses many relics of the event, including several tricolour flags.

Other exhibition spaces that also host historical tricolour flags in Lombardy include the International Museum of the Red Cross in Castiglione delle Stiviere, the Museum of the Risorgimento in Bergamo, the Museum of the Risorgimento in Brescia, the Museum of the Risorgimento in Como, the Vittoriale degli Italiani in Gardone Riviera, the Museum of the Risorgimento in Mantua, the Museum of the Risorgimento in Pavia and the Museum of the Risorgimento in Voghera.

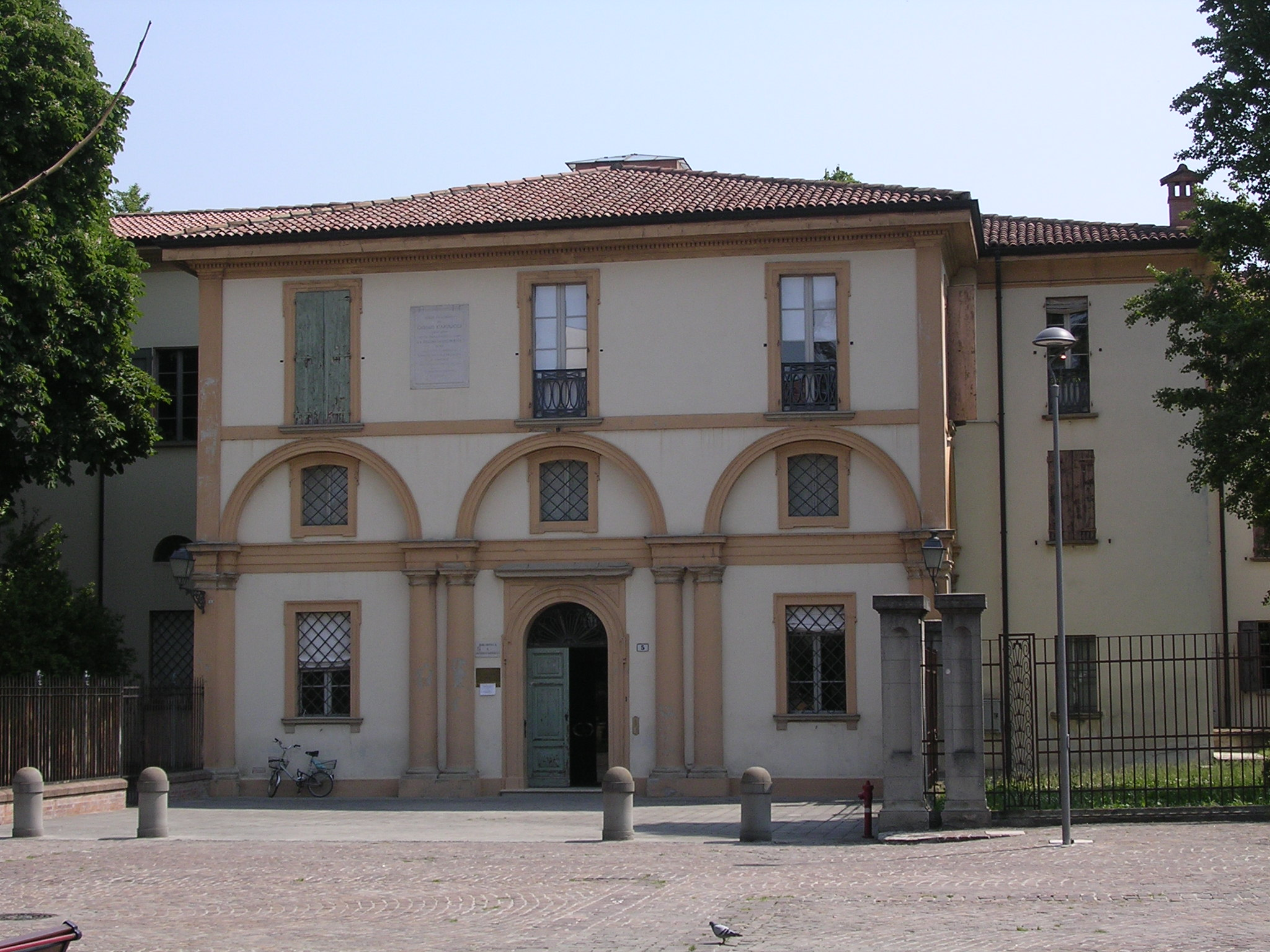
The Civic Museum of the Risorgimento in Bologna

In Venice, the Museum of the Risorgimento and the Venetian 19th century preserves the tricolour flag of 1848 which greeted the expulsion of the Austrians from the city; Venice also hosts the Naval History Museum, which has an importance comparable to the homonymous exhibition space in La Spezia. The description of the Triveneto museums is completed by the Italian War History Museum in Rovereto, dedicated to World War I, which houses many relics, including several tricolour flags; the Historical Museum of Trento, which preserves items dedicated to the Alpini troops, the Museum of the Risorgimento and of the contemporary age in Padua, the Museum of the Risorgimento and of the Resistance in Vicenza. In Trieste, there is the Museum of the Risorgimento and the shrine of Oberdan.

In Sardinia, in addition to the Museum of the Risorgimento of the State Archives in Cagliari, there is the Museum of the Risorgimento Duca d'Aosta in Sanluri, set up at the castle of Eleonora D'Arborea, which preserves, among the numerous patriotic and the historical flags, the tricolour that on 3 November 1918 flew first in the Trieste just reconquered by Italy after the victory in World War I.

Other exhibition spaces that also host historical tricolour flags in other regions of Italy include the Domus Mazziniana in Pisa, the Marche museum of the Risorgimento and the Resistance in Macerata, the Museum of the Risorgimento in Palermo, which also preserves one of the original tricolour flags belonging to the Lombardo steamship which participated in the Expedition of the Thousand, and the museum of the State Archives in Naples which houses, among other things, twelve of the twenty-one tricolour flags requisitioned by the Bourbon general Carlo Filangieri from the Sicilian patriots of Caltagirone, Catania, Leonforte and Syracuse during the Sicilian revolution of 1848.

== Similar national flags ==
Comparison of similarities of the Italian and Mexican flags

The Italian national flag belongs to the family of flags derived from the French tricolour, with all the meanings attached, as mentioned, to the ideals of the French Revolution.

Due to the common arrangement of the colours, at first sight, it seems that the only difference between the Italian and the Mexican flag is only the coat of arms of Mexico present in the latter; in reality the Italian tricolour uses lighter shades of green and red, and has different proportions than the Mexican flag—those of the Italian flag are equal to 2:3, while the proportions of the Mexican flag are 4:7. The similarity between the two flags posed a serious problem in maritime transport, given that originally the Mexican mercantile flag was devoid of arms and therefore was consequently identical to the Italian Republican tricolour of 1946; to obviate the inconvenience, at the request of the International Maritime Organization, both Italy and Mexico adopted naval flags with different crests.

Also due to the Italian layout, the Italian flag is also quite similar to the flag of Ireland, with the exception of orange instead of red (although the shades used for these two colours are very similar) and proportions (2:3 against 1:2).

Flag of Ireland

The Hungarian flag has the same colours as the Italian one, but on the Magyar banner the red, white and green tricolour is arranged horizontally. Another banner chromatically similar to the Italian one is the flag of Bulgaria; similarly to the Hungarian flag, the Bulgarian banner has the white, green and red tricolour (starting from the top) in horizontal stripes, and therefore also in this case there is no confusion with the Italian tricolour.

Similar to the Hungarian banner is the flag of Iran, but green and red are reversed. In the flag of Madagascar green and red are in horizontal bands while white is in vertical band. The flag of Oman is similar to the Bulgarian banner, but the green and red colours are reversed (the flag of Oman may also be similar to the flag of Hungary, but the red and white colours are reversed), while the flag of Tajikistan is similar to the Hungarian banner.

Finally, they present other combinations of the three colours, the flags of Madagascar, Suriname, and Burundi. The flag of Suriname has a very specific composition of horizontal tricolour bands: the central red band (loaded with a gold star) and flanked by white and green bands. The flag of Burundi instead has a white Saint Andrew's Cross that divides the cloth into four triangular sections, the upper and lower ones red and the lateral ones green.

== The flag in the arts ==
=== In the visual arts ===
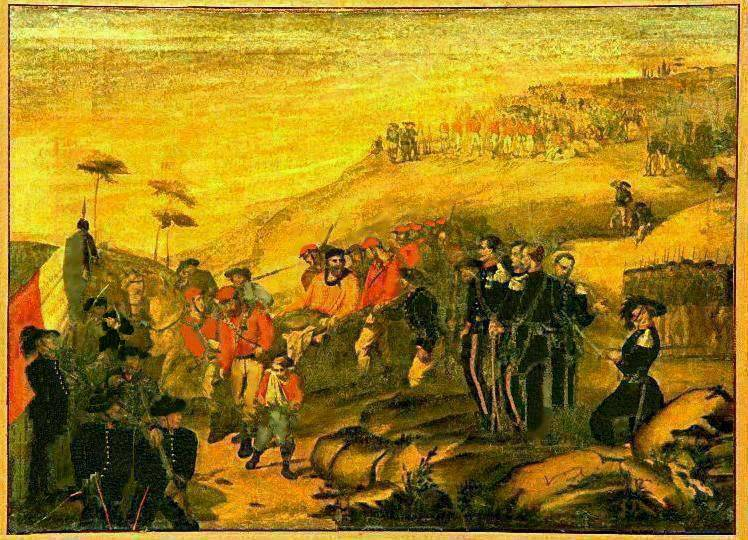
Garibaldi wounded in Aspromonte by an unknown author (around 1870)

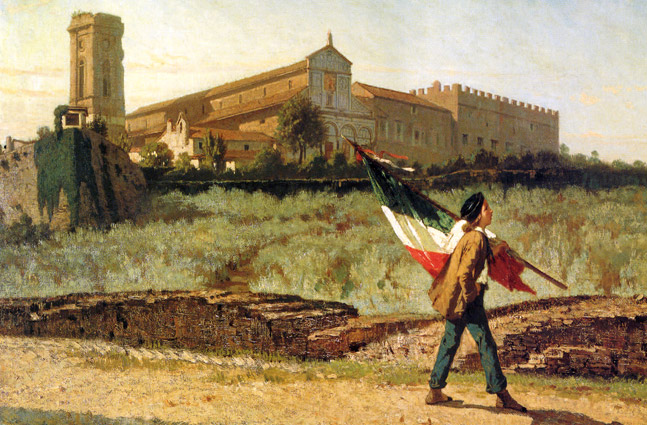
The first Italian flag brought to Florence by Francesco Saverio Altamura (1859)

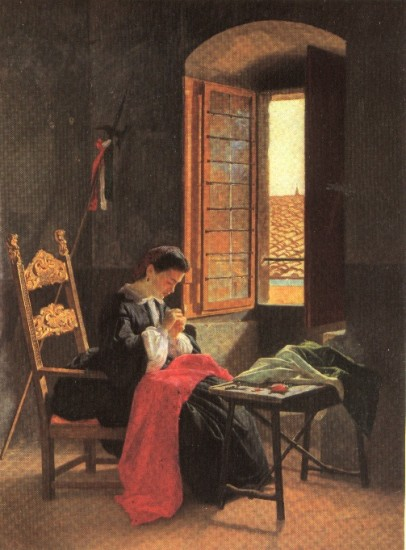
26 April 1859 by Odoardo Borrani (1861)

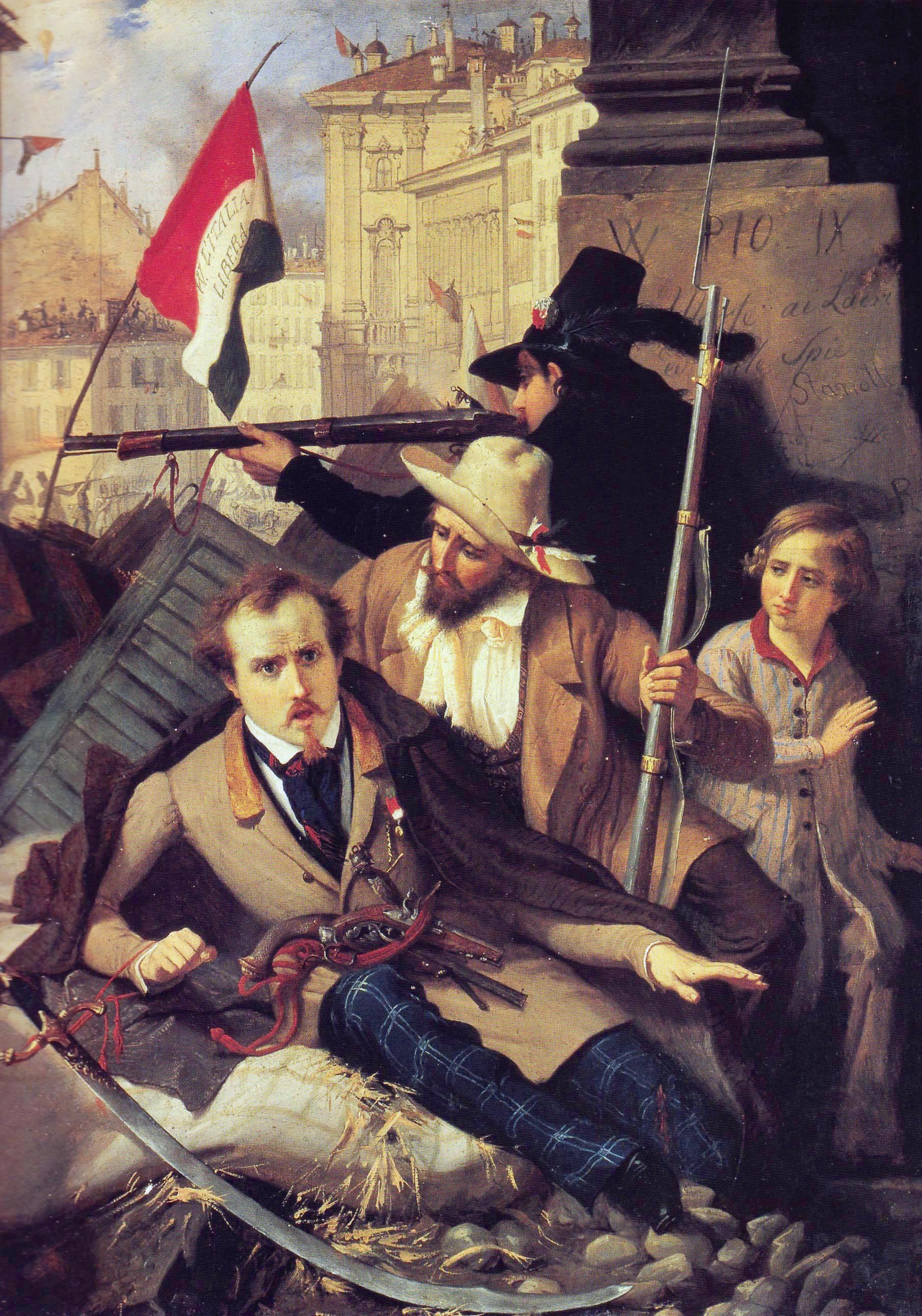
Fighting at Litta Palace (mid 19th century) by Baldassare Verazzi

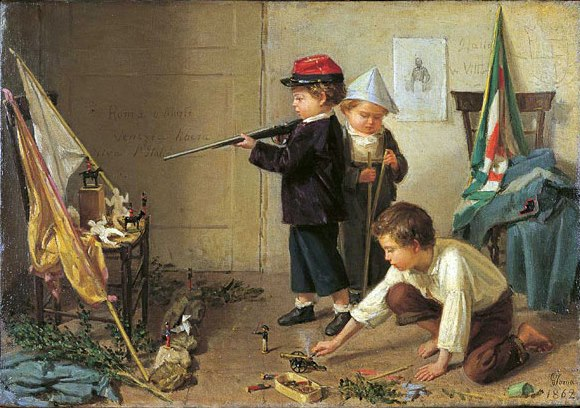
Little patriots (1862) by Gioacchino Toma

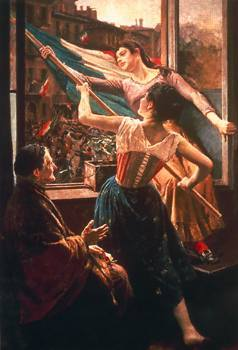
Episode of the Five Days in Piazza Sant'Alessandro (late 19th century) by Carlo Stragliati

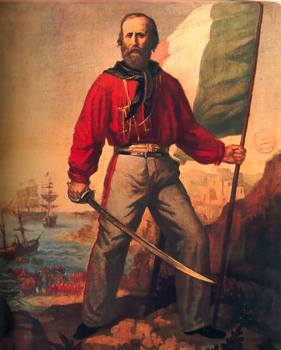
Garibaldi lands in Marsala (late 19th century) by Gerolamo Induno

Famous paintings dating back to the unification of Italy whose subject revolves around the tricolour are Pasquale Sottocorno assaulting the Military Engineering Palace during the Five Days of Milan (1860) by Pietro Bouvier, Charles Albert of Piedmont-Sardinia on the balcony of the Greppi Palace (1848) by Carlo Bossoli, Little patriots (1862) by Gioacchino Toma, Garibaldi lands in Marsala (late 19th century), The departure of the volunteers (1877–1878), The departure of the Garibaldine (1860), The departure of the conscripts in 1866 (1878) The return of the wounded soldier (1854), all by Gerolamo Induno, The first Italian flag brought to Florence (1859) by Francesco Saverio Altamura, The wounded soldier (1865–1870) by Angelo Trezzini, Episode of the Five Days in Piazza Sant'Alessandro by Carlo Stragliati (late 19th century), Fighting at Litta Palace (half 19th century) by Baldassare Verazzi, The brothers are in the field! Remembrance of Venice (1869) by Mosè Bianchi, The breach of Porta Pia (1880) by Carlo Ademollo, On 26 April 1859 (1861) by Odoardo Borrani, and Garibaldi's Burial (1862–64) by Filippo Liardo.

The tricolour often recurs in the paintings of Italian painters adhering to futurism. In particular, Giacomo Balla has often used the symbol of the Italian flag in some patriotic works such as Flag Waving, Interventionist Demonstration and Demonstration 20th September.

=== In music ===
The first songs on the tricolour started to be composed shortly after its official adoption on 7 January 1797. The most famous popular musical composition written in this period and dedicated to the Italian flag is To the tricolour, which reads:

Tricolour the Insignia and the Standard
new fire awaken us in the heart!
The ringing of the trumpets is a harbinger
of victories, triumphs and valor (Note: Tricolore le Insegne e il Vessillo novo foco ci destano in cor! Delle trombe foriero è lo squillo di vittorie, trionfi e valor)

— To the tricolour, unknown author

Most of the songs dedicated to the Italian flag were written during the unification of Italy. The most famous is The flag of the three colours, sung in all Italian primary schools for decades:

The flag of the three colours
has always been the most beautiful,
we always want that,
we want freedom.
And the yellow and black flag
here he has finished reigning!
The yellow and black flag
here he has finished reigning!
All united in one pact
tight around the flag,
we will shout morning and evening:
long live the three colours! (Note: La bandiera dei tre colori è sempre stata la più bella, noi vogliamo sempre quella, noi vogliam la libertà. E la bandiera gialla e nera qui ha finito di regnar! La bandiera gialla e nera qui ha finito di regnar! Tutti uniti in un sol patto stretti intorno alla bandiera, griderem mattina e sera: viva, viva i tre color!)

— The flag of the three colours, unknown author

During the battle of Aspromonte (29 August 1862), the notes of The tricolour flag, by an unknown author, rang out; the flag is also mentioned in Garibaldi's hymn, a 1859 song by Luigi Mercantini, which accompanied the Expedition of the Thousand. Other pieces from the unification of Italy celebrating the tricolour are Giuseppe Bertoldi's Liberation of Milan, O Ardent young people by an anonymous author and Luigi Mercantini's War Hymn of 1848–49.

The Italian flag is then mentioned in the musical composition The bell of San Giusto and in the piece Faccetta Nera, written by Renato Micheli and set to music by Mario Ruccione in April 1935 on the occasion of the Second Italo-Ethiopian War (1935–1936).

The 1961 song The Flag by Domenico Modugno was also dedicated to the flag. In 1965, singer Ivan Della Mea recalled the tricolour as a symbol of national unity in the song 9th May. The song refers to the event organised on 9 May 1965 in memory of the 20eth anniversary of the Liberation of Italy (1943–1945).

In March 2007, singer-songwriter Graziano Romani published the album Three colours, inspired by the Italian flag and the occasion in which the tricolour was adopted in his hometown, Reggio Emilia.

=== In literature ===
Many romantic poets treated the tricolour flag in their literary works, drawing juxtapositions and symbolisms:

From the Alps to the Strait brothers we are all!
On the open limits, on the destroyed thrones
let's plant our common three colours!
Green hopes it for so many years,
red the joy of having accomplished it,
white the brotherly faith of love. (Note: Dall'Alpi allo Stretto fratelli siam tutti! Su i limiti schiusi, su i troni distrutti piantiamo i comuni tre nostri color! Il verde la speme tant'anni pasciuta, il rosso la gioia d'averla compiuta, il bianco la fede fraterna d'amor.)

— Giovanni Berchet, To arms to arms !, 1831

White is the faith that chains us
red is the joy of our hearts
I'll put a verbena leaf in it
which I myself fed with fresh moods. (Note: Il bianco l'é la fede che ci incatena il rosso l'allegria dei nostri cuori ci metterò una foglia di verbena ch'io stesso alimentai di freschi umori.)

— Francesco Dall'Ongaro, The Brigidino (In honor of the Italian tricolour), 1847

We too have our flag
no longer like one day so yellow, so black;
on the white linen of our banner
waving a green laurel wreath:
of our tyrants in cowardly blood
the area of the third colour is tinted. (Note: Noi pure l'abbiamo la nostra bandiera non più come un giorno sì gialla, sì nera; sul candido lino del nostro stendardo ondeggia una verde ghirlanda d'allor: de' nostri tiranni nel sangue codardo è tinta la zona del terzo color.)

— Arnaldo Fusinato, The Song of the Insurgents, April 1848

The three colours of your flag are not three kingdoms but the whole of Italy:
the white Alps,
red the two volcanoes,
green is the grass of the Lombard planes. (Note: I tre colori della tua bandiera non son tre regni ma l'Italia intera: il bianco l'Alpi, il rosso i due vulcani, il verde l'erba dei lombardi piani.)

— Francesco Dall'Ongaro, Garibaldi in Sicily, May 1860

Be blessed! Blessed in the immaculate origin, blessed in the way of trials and misfortunes for which immaculate still you proceeded, blessed in battle and victory, now and forever, forever! Do not ramp of eagles and lions, do not surmount predatory beasts, in the holy banner; but the colours of our spring and our country, from Mont Cenis to Etna; the snows of the Alps, the April of the valleys, the flames of the volcanoes. And immediately those colours spoke to generous and kind souls, with the inspirations and effects of the virtues with which the homeland stands and augusts: white, the serene faith in the ideas that make the soul divine in the constancy of the wise; green, the perpetual re-flowering of hope as the fruit of good in the youth of poets; red, the passion and blood of martyrs and heroes. And immediately the people sang to her flag that she was the most beautiful of all and that they always wanted her and with her freedom! (Note: Sii benedetta! Benedetta nell'immacolata origine, benedetta nella via di prove e di sventure per cui immacolata ancora procedesti, benedetta nella battaglia e nella vittoria, ora e sempre, nei secoli! Non rampare di aquile e leoni, non sormontare di belve rapaci, nel santo vessillo; ma i colori della nostra primavera e del nostro paese, dal Cenisio all'Etna; le nevi delle alpi, l'aprile delle valli, le fiamme dei vulcani. E subito quei colori parlarono alle anime generose e gentili, con le ispirazioni e gli effetti delle virtù onde la patria sta e si augusta: il bianco, la fede serena alle idee che fanno divina l'anima nella costanza dei savi; il verde, la perpetua rifioritura della speranza a frutto di bene nella gioventù de' poeti; il rosso, la passione ed il sangue dei martiri e degli eroi. E subito il popolo cantò alla sua bandiera ch'ella era la più bella di tutte e che sempre voleva lei e con lei la libertà!)

— Giosuè Carducci, speech given to celebrate the 1st Centenary of the birth of the Tricolour, Reggio Emilia, 7 January 1897

== See also ==
- Cockade of Italy
- Flags of Napoleonic Italy
- Flags of regions of Italy
- List of Italian flags
- National symbols of Italy
- Sala del Tricolore
- Tricolour Day
- Tricolour Flag Museum
- Flag of Mexico

== Bibliography ==
- Bellocchi, Ugo (2008). Bandiera madre – I tre colori della vita (in Italian). Scripta Maneant. ISBN 978-88-95847-01-6.
- Bovio, Oreste (1996). Due secoli di tricolore (in Italian). Ufficio storico dello Stato Maggiore dell'Esercito. SBN IT\ICCU\BVE\0116837.
- Bronzini, Giovanni Battista; Dal Mestre, Luigi (1986). "La restaurazione austriaca a Milano nel 1814". Lares (in Italian). LII (3). Casa Editrice Leo S. Olschki: 425–464.
- Busico, Augusta (2005). Il tricolore: il simbolo la storia (in Italian). Presidenza del Consiglio dei Ministri, Dipartimento per l'informazione e l'editoria. SBN IT\ICCU\UBO\2771748.
- Colangeli, Oronzo (1965). Simboli e bandiere nella storia del Risorgimento italiano (PDF) (in Italian). Patron. SBN IT\ICCU\SBL\0395583. Archived (PDF) from the original on 6 August 2020.
- Fiorini, Vittorio (1897). "Le origini del tricolore italiano". Nuova Antologia di Scienze Lettere e Arti (in Italian). LXVII (fourth series): 239–267 and 676–710. SBN IT\ICCU\UBO\3928254.
- Maiorino, Tarquinio; Marchetti Tricamo, Giuseppe; Zagami, Andrea (2002). Il tricolore degli italiani. Storia avventurosa della nostra bandiera (in Italian). Arnoldo Mondadori Editore. ISBN 978-88-04-50946-2.
- Tarozzi, Fiorenza; Vecchio, Giorgio (1999). Gli italiani e il tricolore (in Italian). Il Mulino. ISBN 88-15-07163-6.
- Tobia, Bruno (2011). L'Altare della Patria (in Italian). Il Mulino. ISBN 978-88-15-23341-7.
- Vecchio, Giorgio (2003). "Il tricolore". Almanacco della Repubblica (in Italian). Bruno Mondadori. pp. 42–55. ISBN 88-424-9499-2.
- Villa, Claudio (2010). I simboli della Repubblica: la bandiera tricolore, il canto degli italiani, l'emblema (in Italian). Comune di Vanzago. SBN IT\ICCU\LO1\1355389.
