= List of wars involving Italy =

This is a list of wars involving the Italian Republic and its predecessor states since the Italian wars of independence in the 19th century, but does not include wars fought by the historic states of Italy. The result of these conflicts follows this legend:

Italian victory
Italian defeat
Another result*
Ongoing conflict

*e.g. result unknown or indecisive/inconclusive, result of internal conflict inside Italy, status quo ante bellum, or a treaty or peace without a clear result.

== Italian Wars of Unification ==
The Risorgimento movement emerged to unite Italy in the 19th century. The Kingdom of Piedmont-Sardinia took the lead in a series of wars to liberate Italy from foreign control. Following three Wars of Italian Independence against the Habsburg Austrians in the north, the Expedition of the Thousand against the Bourbons of the Two Sicilies in the south, and the Capture of Rome, the unification of the country was completed in 1871 when Rome was declared capital of Italy.

Start	Finish	Name of conflict	Belligerents		Outcome
Start	Finish	Name of conflict	Combatant 1	Combatant 2	Outcome
1848	1849	First Italian War of Independence	Kingdom of Sardinia; Italian Volunteer Army; Supported by: Provisional Government of Milan; Republic of San Marco; Kingdom of Sicily; Grand Duchy of Tuscany; Duchy of Modena and Reggio; Duchy of Parma and Piacenza; Roman Republic	Austrian Empire; Kingdom of Lombardy–Venetia; (French Second Republic) French Republic; (1849)	Austrian victory: Return to the status quo ante bellum
1853	1856	Crimean War	Ottoman Empire; France (Note: From 1854); United Kingdom (Kingdom of Sardinia) Sardinia (Note: From 1855)	Russia Greece (Note: Until 1854)	Allied victory: Russia loses the Danube Delta and Southern Bessarabia
1859	1859	Second Italian War of Independence	France; Sardinia	Austria	Franco-Sardinian victory: Armistice of Villafranca; Sardinia annexes Lombardy from Austria, occupies and later annexes Habsburg-ruled Tuscany, Modena and Emilia. France gains Savoy and Nice from Sardinia.
1860	1860	Expedition of the Thousand	Redshirts; Supported by: (Kingdom of Sardinia) Piedmont-Sardinia	(Kingdom of the Two Sicilies) Two Sicilies; Supported by: Papal States	Garibaldine victory: Liberation of Southern Italy; Collapse of the Kingdom of the Two Sicilies; Papal States reduced to Lazio; Proclamation of the Kingdom of Italy; Post-Unification Italian Brigandage; Southern Italy, Marche and Umbria annexed by the Kingdom of Piedmont-Sardinia
1861	1865	Brigandage in Southern Italy	Kingdom of Italy	Southern Italian brigands Supported by: Bourbon Legitimists in Southern Italy; Partisans from Bourbon Spain	Unification victory
1866	1866	Third Italian War of Independence	Kingdom of Italy; Supported by: Prussia	Austrian Empire; Liechtenstein	Italian victory: Veneto, Friuli and Mantua annexed by Italy
1870	1870	Capture of Rome	Kingdom of Italy	Papal States	Italian victory: Fall of the Papal States; Completion of the Italian unification; Rome becomes the capital of Italy; Annexation of Rome and Lazio by the Kingdom of Italy

== Kingdom of Italy (1861–1946) ==
Start	Finish	Name of conflict	Belligerents		Outcome
Start	Finish	Name of conflict	Combatant 1	Combatant 2	Outcome
1885	1895	Eritrean war	Italy	Ethiopia; Mahdist Sudan; Eritrean rebels	Italian Victory: Treaty of Wuchale ends the Italo-Ethiopian War of 1887–1889, establishment of Italian Eritrea; defence and consolidation of the colony in the 1890s
1881	1899	Mahdist War	United Kingdom • Egypt • India • Canada • New South Wales; Italy • (Kingdom of Italy) Eritrea; Ethiopia; Congo Free State	Mahdist State	Allied victory: Sudanese invasions of neighbours repelled; Establishment of Anglo-Egyptian Sudan, a polity jointly ruled by Britain and Egypt; Kassala temporarily occupied by Italy; Congo secures the Lado Enclave until 1910
1895	1896	First Italo-Ethiopian War	Kingdom of Italy	Ethiopian Empire	Ethiopian victory: Treaty of Addis Abeba abrogates and replaces the treaty of Wuchale; Sovereignty of Ethiopia preserved; Italian possession of Eritrea confirmed
1890s	1908	Benadir war	Italy	Bimaal and other groups; Ethiopia; Dervish movement	Italian Victory: Establishment of Italian Somaliland; Suppression of the Bimaal revolt
1897	1898	Cretan Revolt (1897–1898) (International Squadron (Cretan intervention, 1897–1898))	Cretan revolutionaries Kingdom of Greece; British Empire; France (Kingdom of Italy) Italy; Russian Empire; Austria-Hungary (until April 12, 1898); German Empire (until March 16th, 1898)	Ottoman Empire	Italian Victory: Cretan State established through the intervention of the great powers of Europe; Withdraw of Ottoman forces from Crete.
1899	1901	Boxer Rebellion	(British Empire) United Kingdom Japan; Russia; France; United States; Germany; Italy; Austria-Hungary	Righteous Harmony Society Manchu-China	Italian Allied Victory, Boxer Protocol: Anti-foreign societies banned in China.; Italy obtains the Italian concession of Tientsin
1900	1920	Somaliland Campaign	Italy; United Kingdom	Dervish movement Ethiopian Empire	Italian-British Victory: Collapse of the Dervish state
1902	1903	Venezuelan naval blockade	United Kingdom (German Empire) Germany; Italy	Venezuela	Inconclusive/Other Outcome: Venezuelan debt dispute resolved
1911	1912	Italo-Turkish War	Italy	Ottoman Empire	Italian Victory: Italy gains Tripolitania, Cyrenaica, Fezzan and the Dodecanese Islands.
1914	1918	World War I	Allied Powers France; British Empire: United Kingdom; Canada; Newfoundland; Australia; New Zealand; India; South Africa; Russia; United States; Italy; Japan; China; Serbia; Montenegro; Romania; Belgium; Greece; Portugal; Brazil	Central Powers Germany; Austria-Hungary; Ottoman Empire; Bulgaria	Italian Allied Victory: Destruction of the Austro-Hungarian Empire; Annexation of Trentino-Alto Adige, Gorizia and Gradisca, Istria, Trieste, Zara and the Julian March to the Kingdom of Italy.; Armistice of Villa Giusti; Treaty of Versailles: German demobilisation; Russia pulls out in 1917: Russian Civil War; Creation of the Soviet Union; Joseph Stalin Rises to power; Creation of League of Nations
1918	1920	Allied intervention in the Russian Civil War	(Russia) White Movement; British Empire: United Kingdom; Canada; Australia; India; South Africa; United States; France; Italy; Japan; Czechoslovakia; Greece; Estonia; Serbia; Poland; Romania; China	Russian SFSR; Far Eastern Republic; Latvian SSR; Ukrainian SSR; Commune of Estonia; Mongolian Communists	Bolshevik Victory: White Army defeated; Allied withdrawal from Russia; Soviet Union new Russian Power
1918	1923	Occupation of Constantinople	United Kingdom; France; Italy	Ottoman Empire	Temporary occupation: Constantinople Military occupation by the United Kingdom, followed by France and Italy, then abandoned.; Britain officially dismantled the Ottoman Empire parliament on 16 March 1920 and restored it on 9 September 1922 to the Ankara Government
1919	1923	Turkish War of Independence	Ottoman Empire; Russian SFSR; Italy	United Kingdom; France; Greece; Armenia; Georgia	Italian Allied Victory: Treaty of Lausanne
1920	1920	Vlora crisis	Italy	Principality of Albania	Compromise agreement: Italy voluntarily abandons Vlora, but annexes the island of Saseno.; Italy abandons plans to establish a mandate over Albania, but retains diplomatic protection over the country to guarantee its special interests.
1920	1920	Bloody Christmas	Italy	Italian Regency of Carnaro	Italian Victory: Expulsion of D'Annunzio's forces.; Conquest of the Italian Regency of Carnaro.; Independence of the Free State of Fiume.
1923	1932	Pacification of Libya	Italy	Senussi Order	Italian Victory: Stabilization of Italian rule in Libya.; Ethnic cleansing of the Cyrenaican indigenous population.; Mass deaths of Cyrenaican indigenous civilians.
1924	1927	Pacification of Italian Somaliland	Italy	Sultanate of Hobyo Majeerteen Sultanate; Somali rebels	Italian Victory: Pacification of Somalia; The independent Majeerteen Sultanate is suppressed in 1927, finalizing the Italian occupation of Somalia.
1935	1937	Second Italo-Abyssinian War	Italy: Italian Eritrea; Italian Somaliland	Ethiopian Empire	Italian Victory: Debellation of Ethiopia, foundation of Italian East Africa.
1936	1939	Spanish Civil War	(Spain) Nationalist Italy; Germany; Portugal; Foreign volunteers	(Second Spanish Republic) Republican Foreign volunteers Soviet Union (1936–1938); Mexico	Italian Allied Victory: Defeat of the Second Spanish Republic; Beginning of Franco's dictatorship
1939	1939	Invasion of Albania	Italy	Albania	Italian Victory, Italian occupation of Albania.
1939	1945	World War II: Italian Resistance (1943-1945); Italian Civil War; Japanese-Italian War	Axis Powers Germany; Japan; Italy (until 1943); Italian Social Republic (from 23 Sep. 1943); Hungary; Romania (until 1944); Bulgaria (until 1944); Serbia (until 1944); Slovakia; Croatia; Finland (until 1944); Vichy France; Thailand; Manchukuo; Mengjiang	Allied Powers United States; Soviet Union; United Kingdom; China; France; Poland; Canada; Australia; New Zealand; India; South Africa; Yugoslavia; Greece; Denmark; Norway; Netherlands; Belgium; Luxembourg; Czechoslovakia; Brazil; Mexico; Ethiopia; Italy (from 1943); Romania (from 1944); Bulgaria (from 1944); Finland (from 1944)	'United Nations' Allied victory: Kingdom of Italy signs the Armistice of Cassibile, declares war on Germany and becomes a co-belligerent of the Allies in 1943. Japan seizes the Italian concessions in China.; Nazi Germany, along with the collaborationist regime of the Italian Social Republic, is defeated in the 1943-1945 Italian Campaign by the Allies and the Italian Resistance; an aspect of this conflict is the Italian Civil War.; Italy signs the Treaty of Paris. It is forced to cede Istria, Zara and most of the Julian March to Jugoslavia, Brigue and Tende to France, as well as losing all its colonies and part of its surviving fleet, and paying reparations to several countries.

== Italian Republic (1946–present) ==
Start	Finish	Name of Conflict	Belligerents		Outcome
Start	Finish	Name of Conflict	Combatant 1	Combatant 2	Outcome
1960	1964	ONUC	United Nations	Various armed groups	Allied Victory: Stabilization of Congo's security
1982	1984	Multinational Force in Lebanon	Italy United States; France; United Kingdom	Islamic Jihad Organization; Iran; Syria; Progressive Socialist Party; Amal Movement	Withdrawal of the multinational mission, replaced by UNIFIL (ongoing): Multinational forces fail to prevent collapse of Lebanese Army into sectarian militias.; Multinational forces evacuated after the US embassy and US Marine barracks are bombed by the Islamic Jihad Organization.; Multinational forces oversee withdrawal of Palestine Liberation Organization.; Civil war continues until 1990.; Syrian occupation continues until 2005.
1991	1991	Gulf War: Operazione Locusta	Kuwait United States; Saudi Arabia; France; Egypt; Syria; United Kingdom; Italy; Other Allies	Iraq	Allied Victory: Kuwait regains its independence
1992	1995	Bosnian War	Bosnia and Herzegovina; Croatia; Belgium; Canada; Denmark; France; Germany; Italy; Luxembourg; Netherlands; Norway; Portugal; Spain; Turkey; United Kingdom; United States	Republika Srpska	Allied Victory: Dayton Accords; Internal partition of Bosnia and Herzegovina according to the Dayton Accords; Deployment of NATO-led IFOR to oversee the peace agreement; Massive civilian casualties for the Bosniak ethnic group
1992	1995	Somali Civil War	United States; United Kingdom; Italy; Saudi Arabia; Malaysia; Pakistan; Spain; India; Greece; Germany; France; Canada; Botswana; Belgium; Australia	(Somalia) Various Somali factions	UN withdrawal: UN withdrawal.; About 100,000 lives were saved by outside resistance.; Civil war is ongoing.
1997	1997	1997 Albanian civil unrest (Operation Alba)	(Albania) Government of Sali Berisha (Operation Alba): (Italy) Italian Armed Forces; (France) French Armed Forces; (Turkey) Turkish Armed Forces; (Greece) Hellenic Armed Forces; (Romania) Romanian Armed Forces; (Austria) Austrian Armed Forces; (Operation Libelle): (Germany) German Armed Forces; (Operation Silver Wake): United States Armed Forces	(Albania) Rebels	Allied Victory New Parliamentary Elections.
1998	1999	Kosovo War	United States France; Canada; Denmark; Germany; Italy; Kosovo Liberation Army	FR Yugoslavia	NATO victory: Kosovo administered by UNMIK
2001	2021	Afghanistan War	Afghanistan; United States; United Kingdom; Italy; Germany; France; Canada; Australia; New Zealand; Georgia; Poland; Romania; Turkey ISAF: Albania; Armenia; Austria; Azerbaijan; Bahrain; Belgium; Bosnia and Herzegovina; Bulgaria; Croatia; Czech Republic; Denmark; El Salvador; Estonia; Finland; Greece; Hungary; Iceland; Ireland; Jordan; Latvia; Lithuania; Luxembourg; Malaysia; Mongolia; Montenegro; Netherlands; Norway; Portugal; Republic of Macedonia; Singapore; Slovakia; Slovenia; South Korea; Spain; Sweden; Switzerland; Tonga; Ukraine; United Arab Emirates; (Afghanistan) Northern Alliance	Taliban al-Qaeda; Islamic Movement of Uzbekistan; HI-Gulbuddin; Hezb-e Islami Khalis; Haqqani network Lashkar-e-Taiba; Jaish-e-Mohammed; East Turkestan Islamic Movement; Tehrik-i-Taliban Pakistan; Islamic Emirate of Waziristan; Tehreek-e-Nafaz-e-Shariat-e-Mohammadi; Islamic Jihad Union Islamic Emirate of Afghanistan	Defeat: Invasion of Afghanistan; Fall of the Taliban government in Afghanistan; Destruction of al-Qaeda camps; Over two thirds of al-Qaeda's leadership demolished; Occupation of Afghanistan; Establishment of a new Afghan Government and Security Force; Taliban insurgency; Killing of Osama bin Laden; Escape of Ayman al-Zawahiri; Taliban retakes Kabul
2003	2006	Iraq War	Iraq; Iraqi Kurdistan Multi-National Force – Iraq: United States; United Kingdom; Italy; Australia; New Zealand; Spain; Netherlands; Poland; South Korea; Ukraine; Georgia; Other Allies	Islamic State of Iraq al-Qaeda; Various insurgents Ba'athist Iraq	Allied Victory: Overthrow of Ba'ath Party government; Execution of Saddam Hussein; Deployment in Dhi Qar Province; Iraqi insurgency, emergence of al-Qaeda in Iraq, and Sectarian Violence; Rise of the Islamic State of Iraq and the Levant, the successor of al-Qaeda in Iraq; Italian withdrawal in 2006, US withdrawal in 2011
2011	2011	First Libyan Civil War	Many NATO members acting under (United Nations) UN mandate, including: United States; France; Denmark; Italy; Canada and (Libya) Anti-Gaddafi forces several Arab League states Sweden	Libya: Pro-Gaddafi forces	Allied Victory: Fall of Gaddafi regime; Muammar Gaddafi killed; National Transitional Council take control
2024	Ongoing	Operation Aspides	European Union: Belgium; Estonia; Finland; France; Germany; Greece; Italy; Latvia; Netherlands; Sweden	Yemen (SPC): Yemeni Navy (SPC faction); Houthis	Ongoing

== See also ==
- History of Italy
- Military history of Italy
