= List of military equipment of Italy =

This is a list of all military equipment ever used by Italy. This list shall go in chronological order of newest military equipment of Italy to oldest.

== Italian Army ==
- List of military weapons of Italy
- List of equipment of the Italian Army

== Italian Navy ==
- List of active Italian Navy ships
- List of decommissioned ships of the Italian Navy
- Regia Marina

== Italian Air Force ==
- List of aircraft used by Italian Air Force
- List of Regia Aeronautica aircraft used in World War II
- List of World War I Entente aircraft
