= List of Italian service weapons =

== Service rifles ==
Firearm	Type	Calibre	Service
M1870 Italian Vetterli	Bolt-action single-shot	10.4mm Vetterli	1870–1887
M1870/87 Italian Vetterli-Vitali	Bolt-action	10.4mm Vetterli	1892–1950
Carcano	Bolt-action	6.5×52mm Mannlicher–Carcano	1892–1950
M1 Garand	Semi-automatic	.30-06 Springfield	1945–1959
Beretta BM-59	Selective fire	7.62×51mm NATO	1959–1990
Beretta AR70/90	Selective fire	5.56×45mm NATO	1972–present
Beretta ARX160	Selective fire	5.56×45mm NATO	2008–present (used in compresence with the Beretta AR70/90 Rifle)

== Service pistols ==
Firearm	Type	Calibre	Service
Bodeo M1889	Revolver	10.35mm	1889–1945 (?)
Glisenti M1910	Semi-Automatic	9mm Glisenti	1910–1945 (?)
Beretta M1923	Semi-Automatic	9mm Glisenti	1923–1945 (?)
Beretta M1934	Semi-Automatic	.380 ACP	1934–1951
Beretta M1951	Semi-Automatic	9mm Parabellum	1951–1981
Beretta M92FS	Semi-Automatic	9mm Parabellum	1981–Present
