= Sciarpa azzurra =

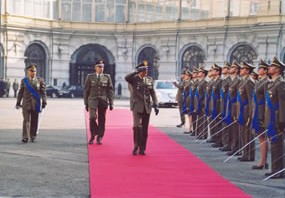
Italian Army officers wearing sciarpa azzurra

The sciarpa azzurra (English: Blue scarf or Blue sash) is a typical external ornament (sash or scarf) used as part of the uniforms of the Officers of the Italian Armed Forces and the Italian Police Corps, worn around the neck or tied around the waist in particular circumstances.

The same accessory is also worn by the Presidents of the provinces and metropolitan mayors of the metropolitan cities in official ceremonies.

== History ==
The origin of the colour (the Savoy blue) seems to date back to 20 June 1366, when the Green Count, Amadeus VI of Savoy, leaving for a crusade wanted by Pope Urban V to help his cousin on his mother's side, the Byzantine emperor John V Palaiologos, wanted that on his Venetian galley, flagship of a fleet of 17 ships and 2,000 men, a blue shawl flew next to the red-crossed silver standard of the House of Savoy:

"...of devotion in blue zendado with the image of Our Lady in a field strewn with stars (gold). And that sky color consecrated to Mary is, as far as I can see, the origin of our national color."

From that period onwards, officers wore a blue sash or scarf tied around their waist, which over time changed shape and placement on the uniform several times.

== The use ==
The Sciarpa azzurra is made up of a deep blue band 8.5 cm wide, with the ends of which end in two tasseled fringes and is worn over the neck, from the right shoulder to the left hip. From the 19th century to the present day, it has been worn around the neck (with the exception of the Cuirassiers, who wear it around the waist), usually from the right shoulder to the left hip. It is worn on the full dress uniform, in certain services such as the "picchetto" or by officers in full dress during ceremonies. It is noteworthy that later, blue would become the color of the House of Savoy, a choice that would also shape the colors of the Italian national football team and other sports. In 1832 the scarf returned to being blue. The blue scarf became a badge of service, not rank, on 9 October 1850.

The current consolidated text of local authorities describes the badge of the president of the province as a blue band with the coat of arms of the Republic and the coat of arms of his own province, to be worn over the shoulder. The provision also applies to the Mayors of metropolitan cities.

== Gallery ==
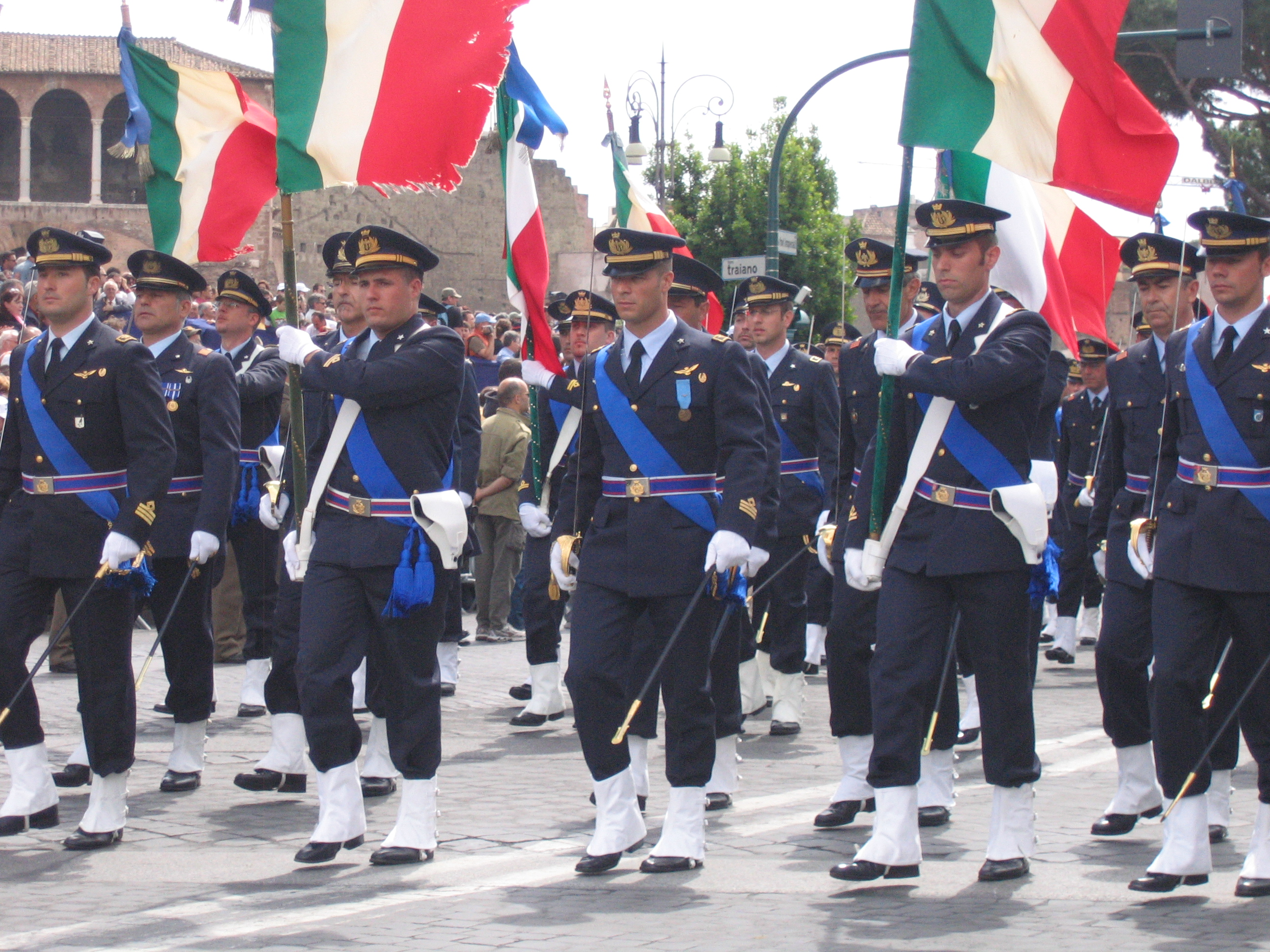
Italian Air Force officers in blue scarves.

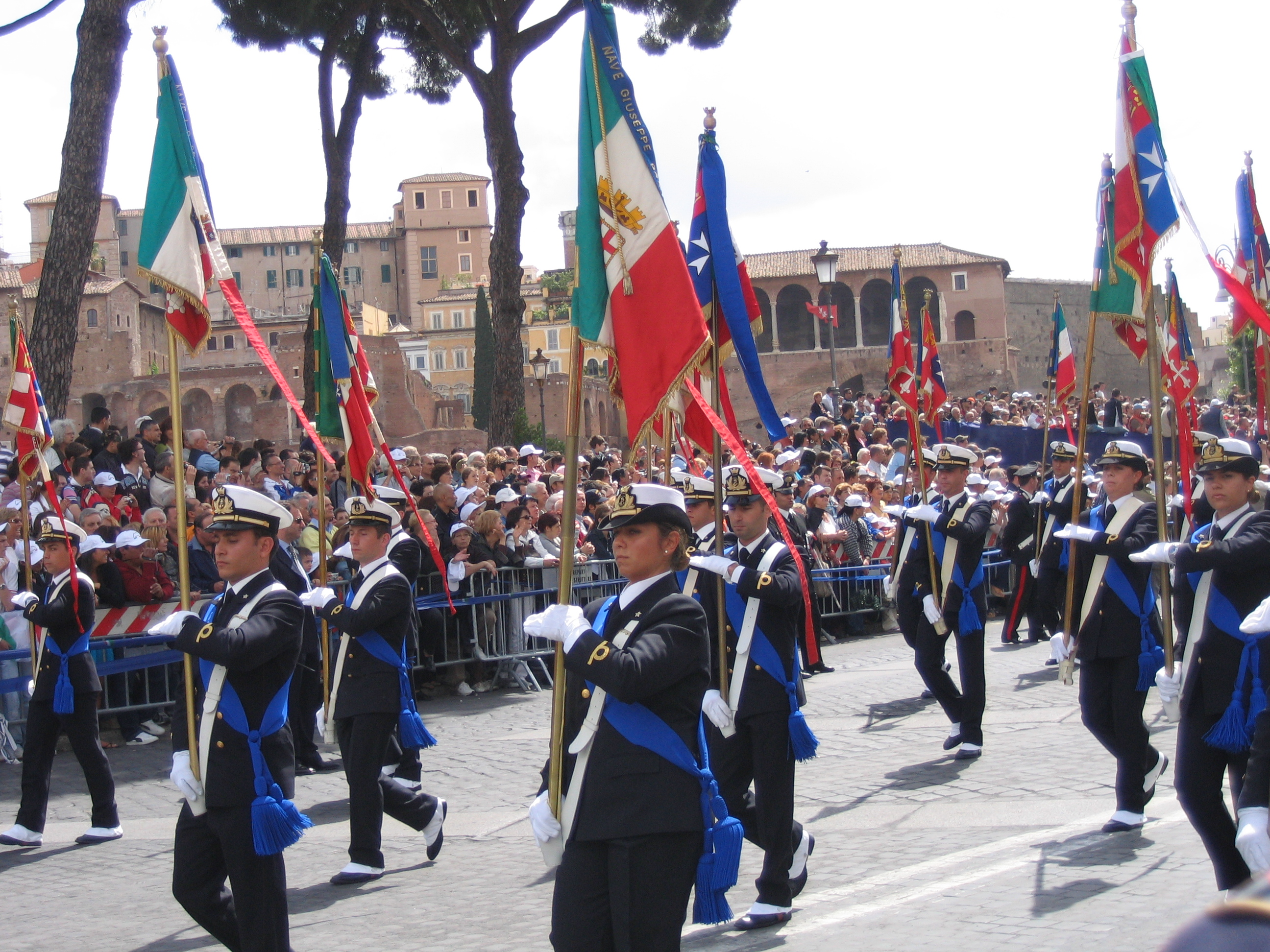
Italian Naval officers in blue scarves.

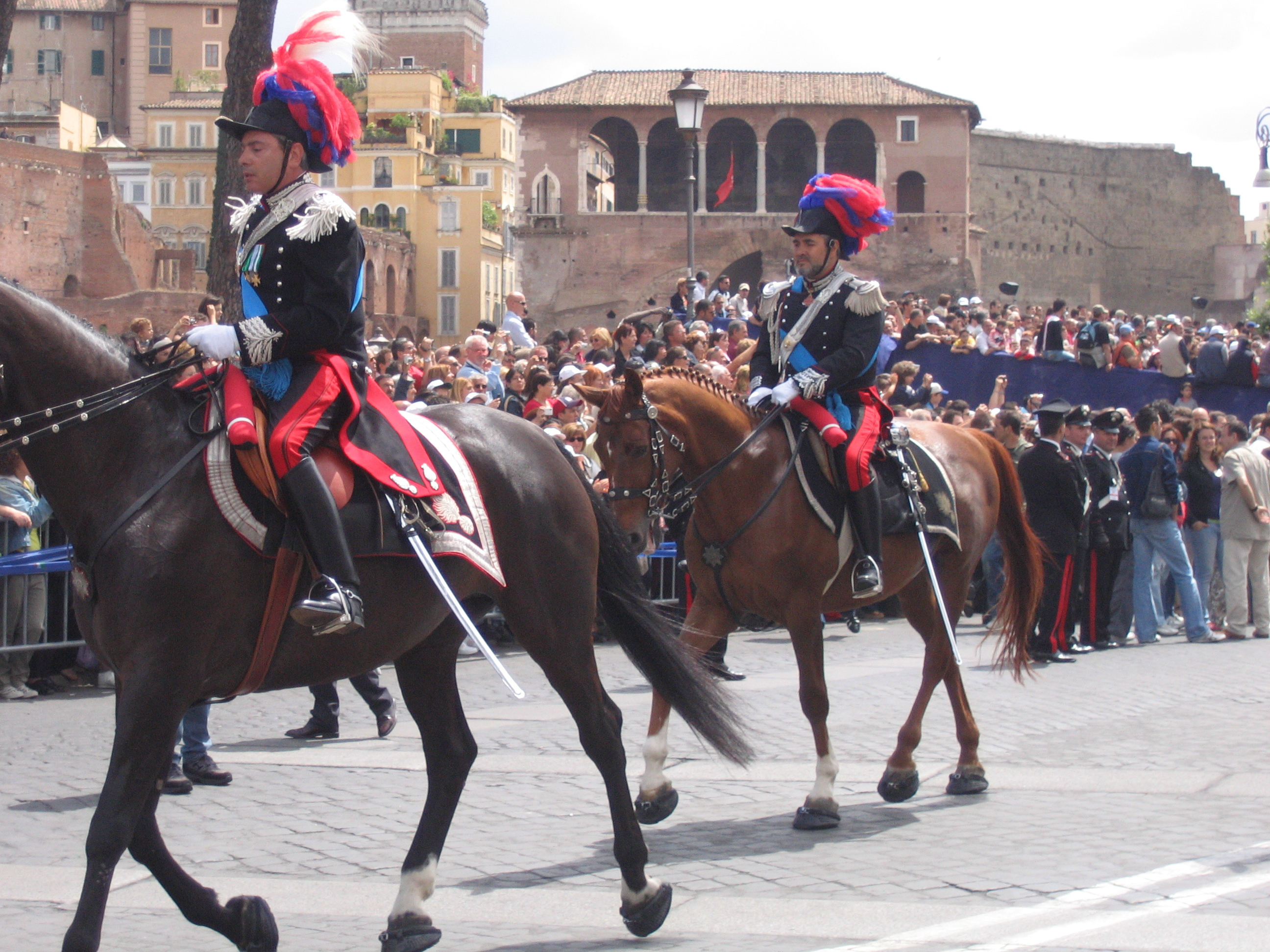
Carabinieri on horseback with blue scarves.

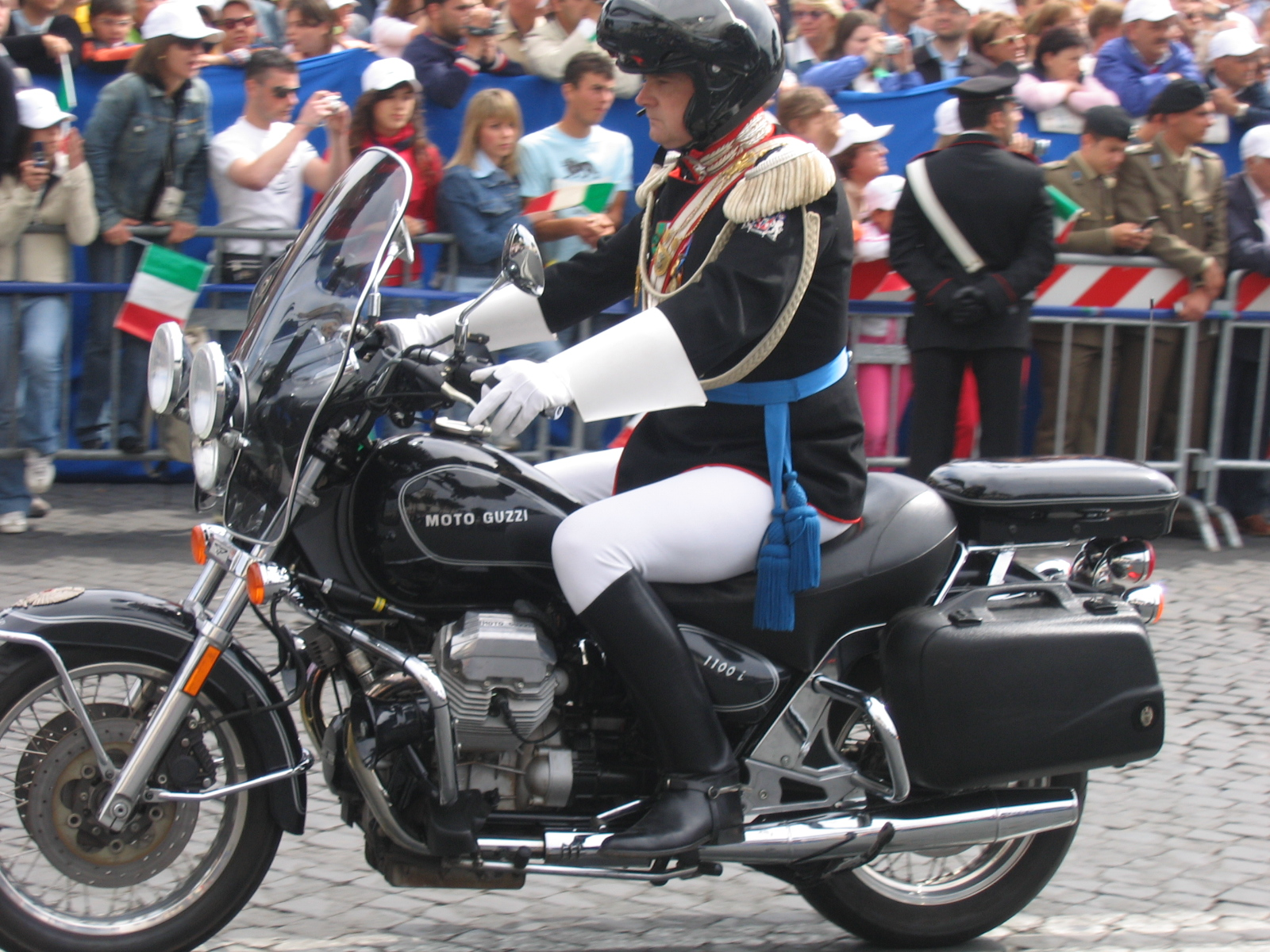
Officer of the Cuirassiers. The blue scarf worn around his waist is clearly visible.

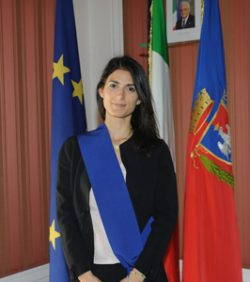
Mayor of Rome Virginia Raggi wearing the blue sash over her shoulder
