= Metropolitan mayor =

Local office in Italy

In the political system of Italy, the metropolitan mayor (Italian: sindaco metropolitano) is the single-member body body at the head of the government of a metropolitan city, a territorial entity that came into force in Italy on 1 January 2015. This position was not introduced by Legislative Decree No. 267/2000 ("Consolidated Law on the Organisation of Local Authorities"), which unlike Law No. 142/1990 did not list the bodies of the metropolitan city, and was instead established and regulated by Law No. 56 of 7 April 2014, containing "Provisions on Metropolitan Cities, Provinces, Unions, and Mergers of Municipalities".

== Functions ==
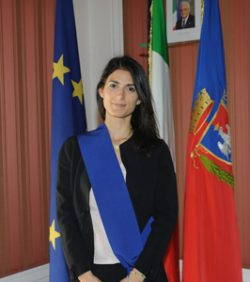
Virginia Raggi wearing the blue sash of the Metropolitan City of Rome Capital over her shoulder

The metropolitan mayor represents the local government institution, convenes and presides over the metropolitan city council and the metropolitan conference, supervises the functioning of the services and offices, and the execution of the acts and exercises the other functions attributed by the statute. He proposes to the metropolitan council the budget plans to be adopted and submitted to the metropolitan conference for opinion. The metropolitan mayor can appoint a deputy mayor, who is chosen from among the metropolitan councillors, establishing any functions delegated to him and giving immediate communication thereof to the metropolitan council.

The deputy mayor exercises the functions of the metropolitan mayor in any case in which the latter is prevented from doing so. If the metropolitan mayor ceases to hold office due to the cessation of the title of mayor of his municipality, the deputy mayor remains in office until the new metropolitan mayor takes office. The metropolitan mayor can also assign delegations to metropolitan councillors, in compliance with the principle of collegiality, according to the methods and within the limits established by the statute. Similarly to the president of the province, the metropolitan mayor wears as a distinctive sign, a light blue sash with the coat of arms of the Italian Republic and the coat of arms of his province, to be worn over the shoulder.

== Election methods ==
The metropolitan mayor is by right the mayor of the administrative centre; to this end, all the statutes of the metropolitan cities identify the capital or the institutional headquarters of the body (with the sole exception of the Metropolitan City of Bologna, in whose statute no capital or legal headquarters is indicated). If certain specific conditions are met, the Law No. 56 of 7 April 2014 (Delrio Law, named after Graziano Delrio) also allows for the possibility that the statute of the metropolitan city provides for the election by universal suffrage of the mayor and the metropolitan council with the electoral system that must be determined by state law.

The statutes of the metropolitan cities of Rome, Milan and Naples provide for the direct election by universal suffrage of the mayor and councilors in the event that the Italian Parliament passes a specific electoral law that regulates the vote. The statute of the metropolitan city of Genoa provides that the metropolitan mayor can be elected by universal and direct suffrage after the conditions established by the law of the state have been met and according to the methods established by the same.

The statutes of the metropolitan cities of Reggio Calabria and Venice provide that the metropolitan mayor and the metropolitan council are elected by universal suffrage, where the division of the capital city into multiple municipalities (comuni) is not provided for; the Delrio Law expressly provides for these entities to need to divide the capital city into multiple municipalities in order to be able to elect the two bodies by universal suffrage. On 1 December 2019, the fifth referendum for the separation of Venice and Mestre took place in Venice (a consultation that if successful would have made it possible to start the process to arrive at the direct election of the metropolitan bodies); however, the necessary quorum was not reached.

== See also ==
- Assembly of Mayors
- Municipal and provincial secretary
- Provincial Council
- Provincial deputation
- Provinces of Italy
- Vice president of the province
