= Quirinal Palace =

Official residence of the President of Italy

- Palazzo del Quirinale
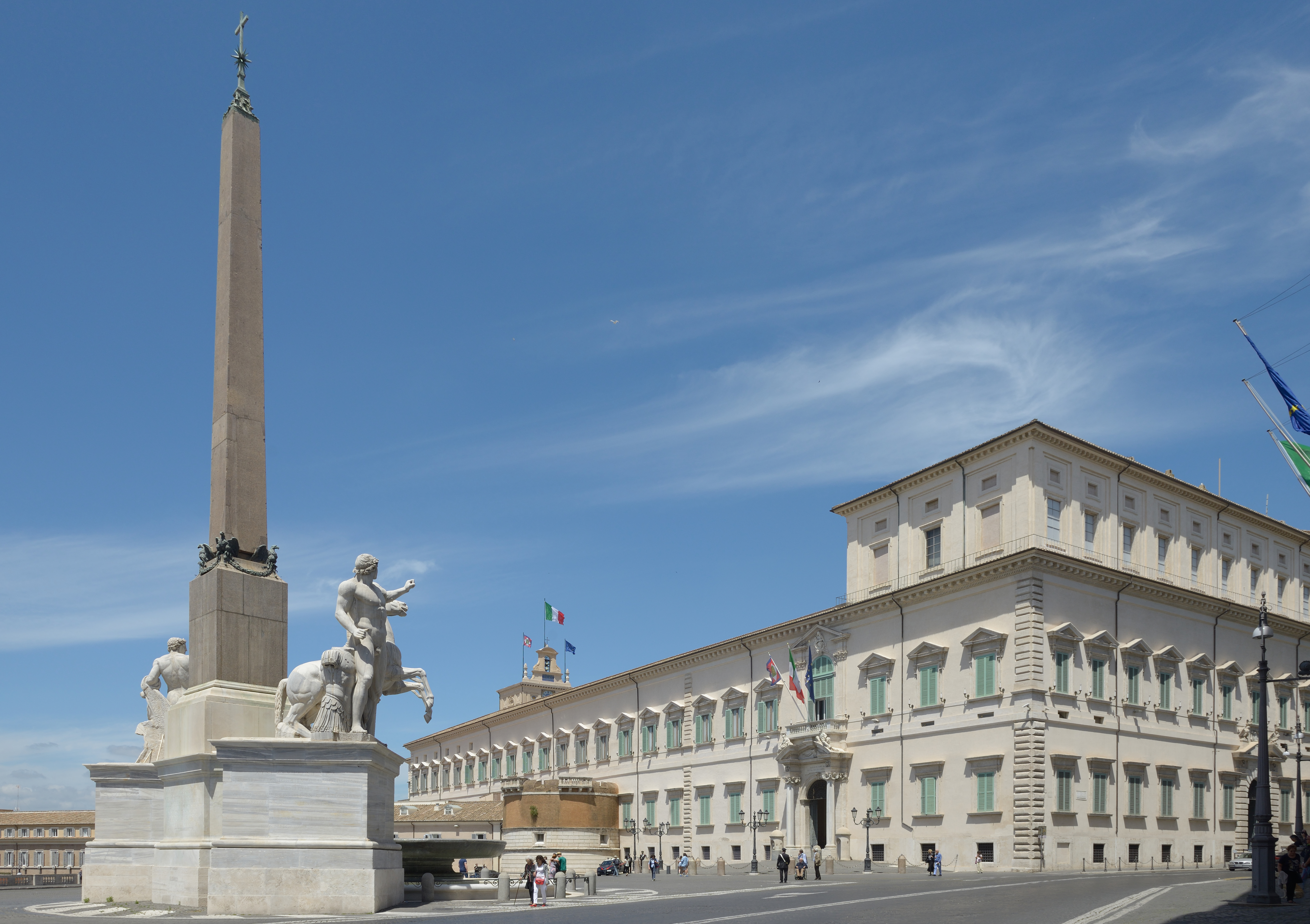
- The palace seen from Piazza del Quirinale
- Click on the map for a fullscreen view

General information
- Location: Rome, Italy
- Coordinates: 41°54′00″N 12°29′15″E
- Current tenants: Sergio Mattarella, as President of Italy
- Completed: 1583
- Client: Pope Gregory XIII

Design and construction
- Architects: Domenico Fontana; Carlo Maderno

The Quirinal Palace (Italian: Palazzo del Quirinale, pronounced [paˈlattso del kwiriˈnaːle]) is a historic building in Rome, Italy, the main official residence of the president of the Italian Republic, together with Villa Rosebery in Naples and the Tenuta di Castelporziano, an estate on the outskirts of Rome, some 25 km (16 mi) from the centre of the city. It is located on the Quirinal Hill, the highest of the seven hills of Rome in an area colloquially called Monte Cavallo. It has served as the residence for thirty popes, four kings of Italy and twelve presidents of the Italian Republic.

The Quirinal Palace, originally a papal residence built by Pope Gregory XIII, was selected by Napoleon to be his residence par excellence as emperor. However, he never stayed there because of the French defeat in 1814 and the subsequent European Restoration.

The palace extends for an area of 110,500 square metres (1,189,000 sq ft) and is the eleventh-largest palace in the world.

== History ==
=== Origins ===
The current site of the palace has been in use since ancient Roman times, as excavations in the gardens testify. On this hill, the Romans built temples for several deities, from Flora to Quirinus, after whom the hill was named. During the reign of Constantine the Great, the last complex of Roman baths was built here, as the statues of the twins Castor and Pollux taming the horses decorating the fountain in the square testify. The Quirinal, being the highest hill in Rome, was much sought after and became a popular location for the Roman patricians, who built luxurious villas there. An example is the remains of a villa in the Quirinal gardens, where a mosaic, part of the old floor has been found.

=== Foundation of the current palace ===
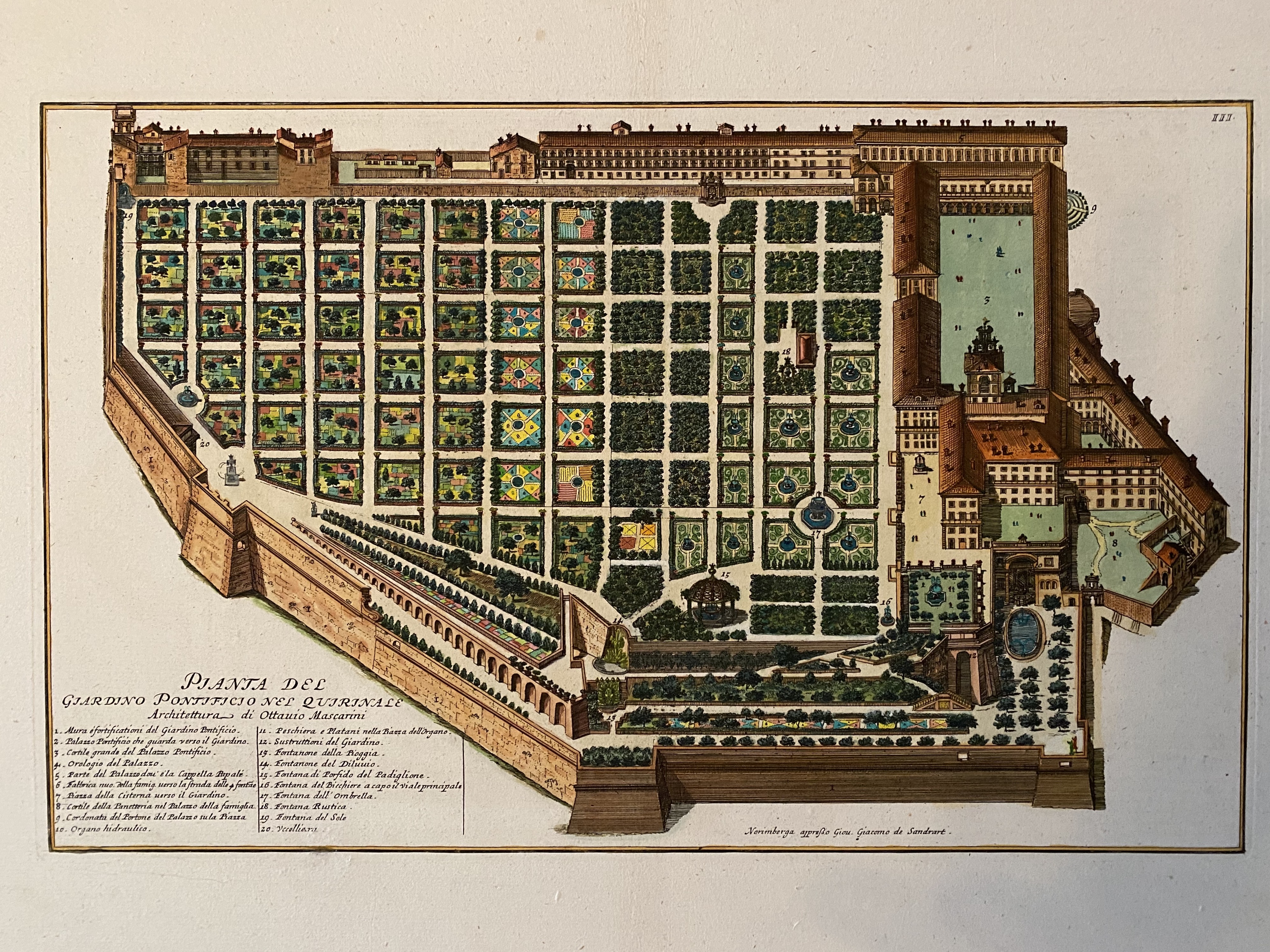
The palace and garden by Giovanni Battista Falda in 1683

The palace, located on the Via del Quirinale and facing onto the Piazza del Quirinale, was built in 1583 by Pope Gregory XIII as a papal summer residence. The Pope, who wanted to find a location which was far away from the humidity and stench coming from the River Tiber and likewise the unhealthy conditions of the Lateran Palace, chose the Quirinal hill as it was one of the most suitable places in Rome. On the site, there was already a small villa owned by the Carafa family and rented to Luigi d'Este. The Pope commissioned the architect Ottaviano Mascherino to build a palace with porticoed parallel wings and an internal courtyard by incorporating the Carafa villa, the original nucleus of the palace, later known as the Gregorian building. That project was not fully completed due to the Pope's death in 1585. However, it is still recognisable in the north part of the courtyard, especially in the double loggia facade, topped by the panoramic Torre dei Venti (tower of the winds) or Torrino. To the latter, a bell tower was added according to a project by Carlo Maderno and Francesco Borromini.

=== From the 17th century ===
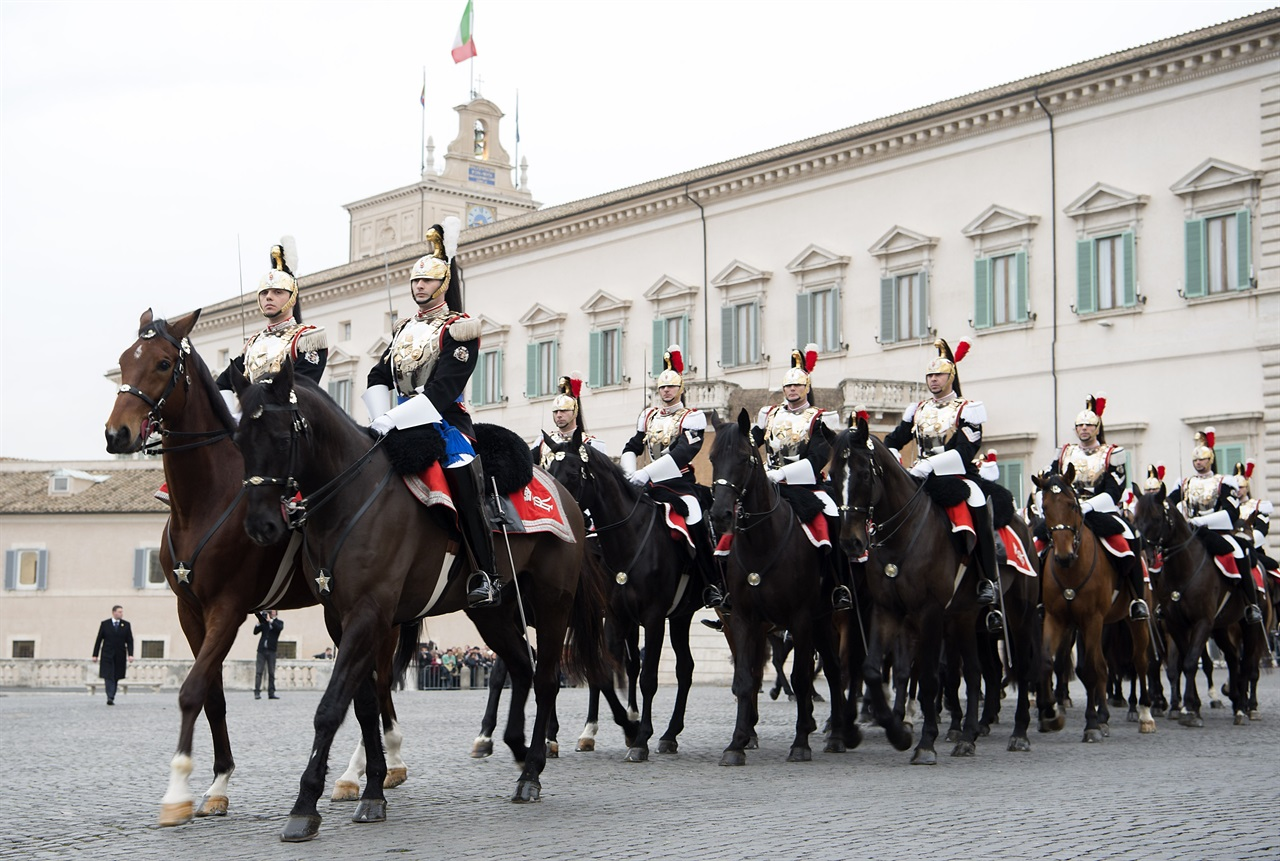
Cuirassiers, honor guard of the president of Italy, outside the palace

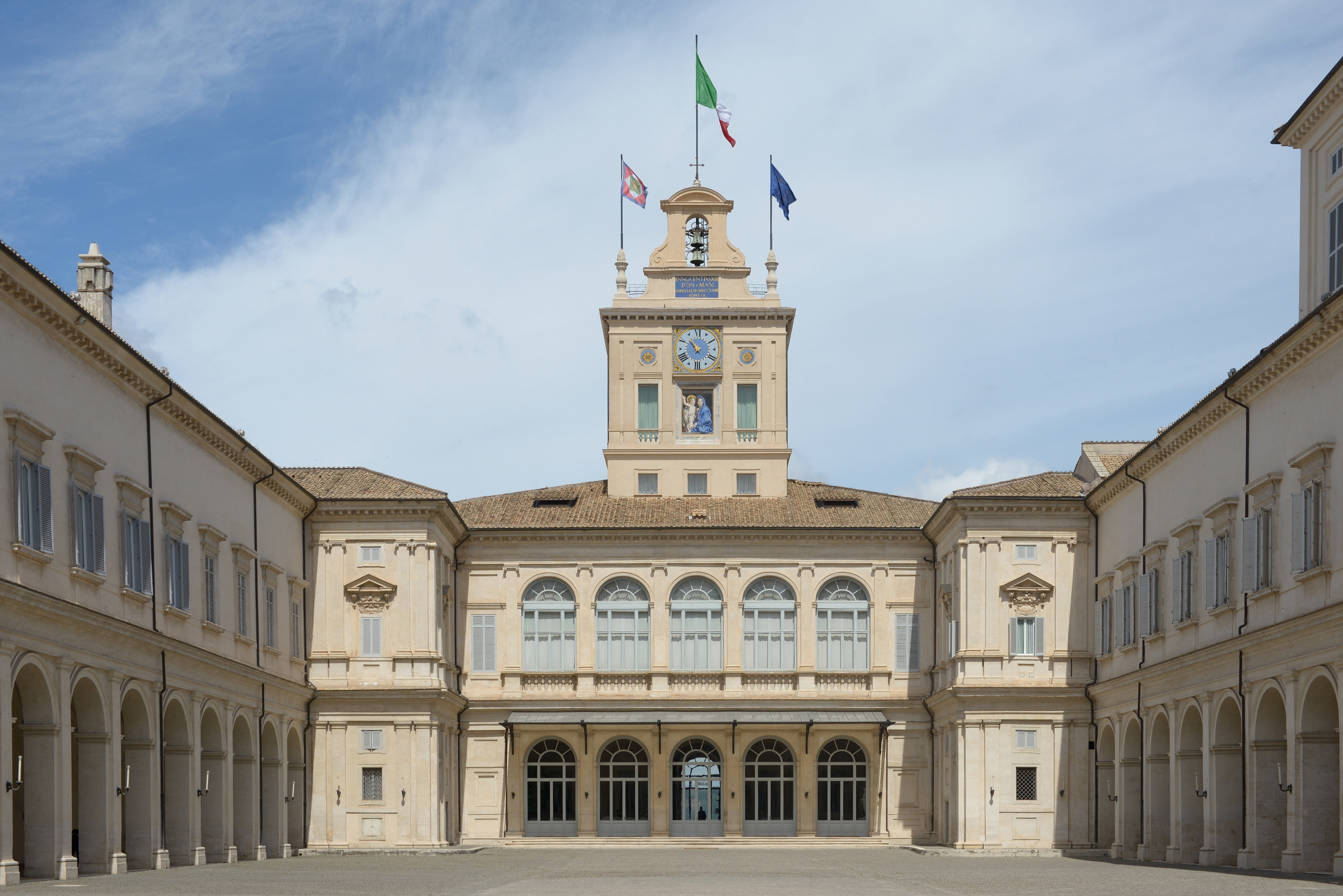
The Courtyard of Honour

Pope Paul V (r. 1605–1621) commissioned the completion of the work on the main building of the palace.

The palace was also used as the location for papal conclaves in 1823, 1829, 1831, and 1846. It served as a papal residence and housed the central offices responsible for the civil government of the Papal States until 1870.

In September 1870, what was left of the Papal States was occupied militarily and annexed to the Kingdom of Italy. Some five months later, in 1871, Rome became the capital of the new Italian state. The palace became the official royal residence of the Kings of Italy, though some of these, notably King Victor Emmanuel III (reigned 1900–1946) actually lived in a private residence elsewhere (Villa Savoia), leaving the Quirinal to be used simply as a suite of offices and for state functions. The monarchy was abolished in 1946 and the palace became the official residence and workplace for the presidents of the Italian Republic. Still, some have declined the Colle residence and kept their usual Roman residence: for example, Sandro Pertini preferred his old flat near the Trevi Fountain.

The palace's façade was designed by Domenico Fontana. Its Great Chapel was designed by Carlo Maderno. It contains frescos by Guido Reni, but the most famous fresco is the Blessing Christ by Melozzo da Forlì, placed over the stairs. The palace grounds include a famous set of gardens laid out in the 17th century.

== Architecture ==
=== Palace ===
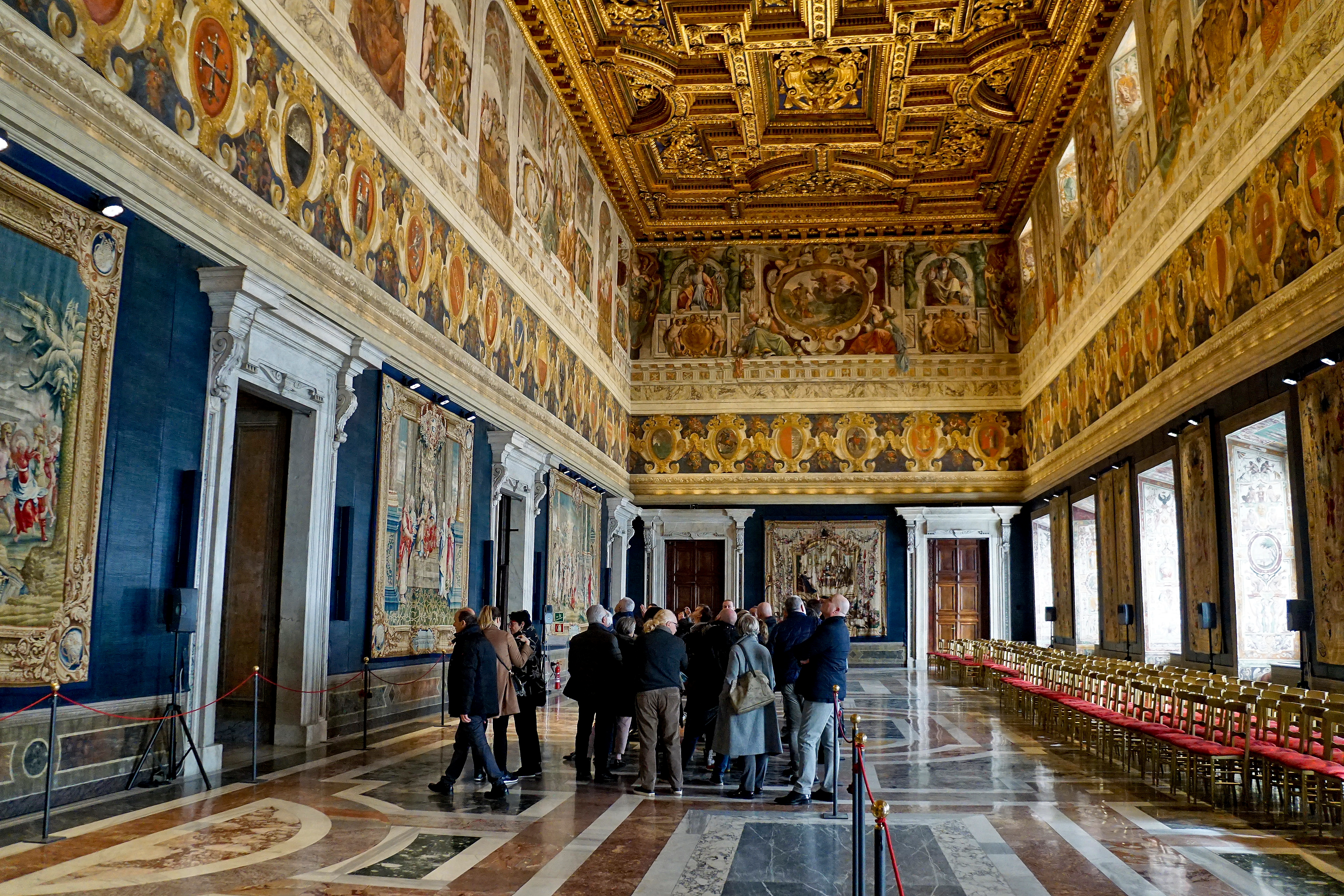
The Great Hall of the Cuirassiers

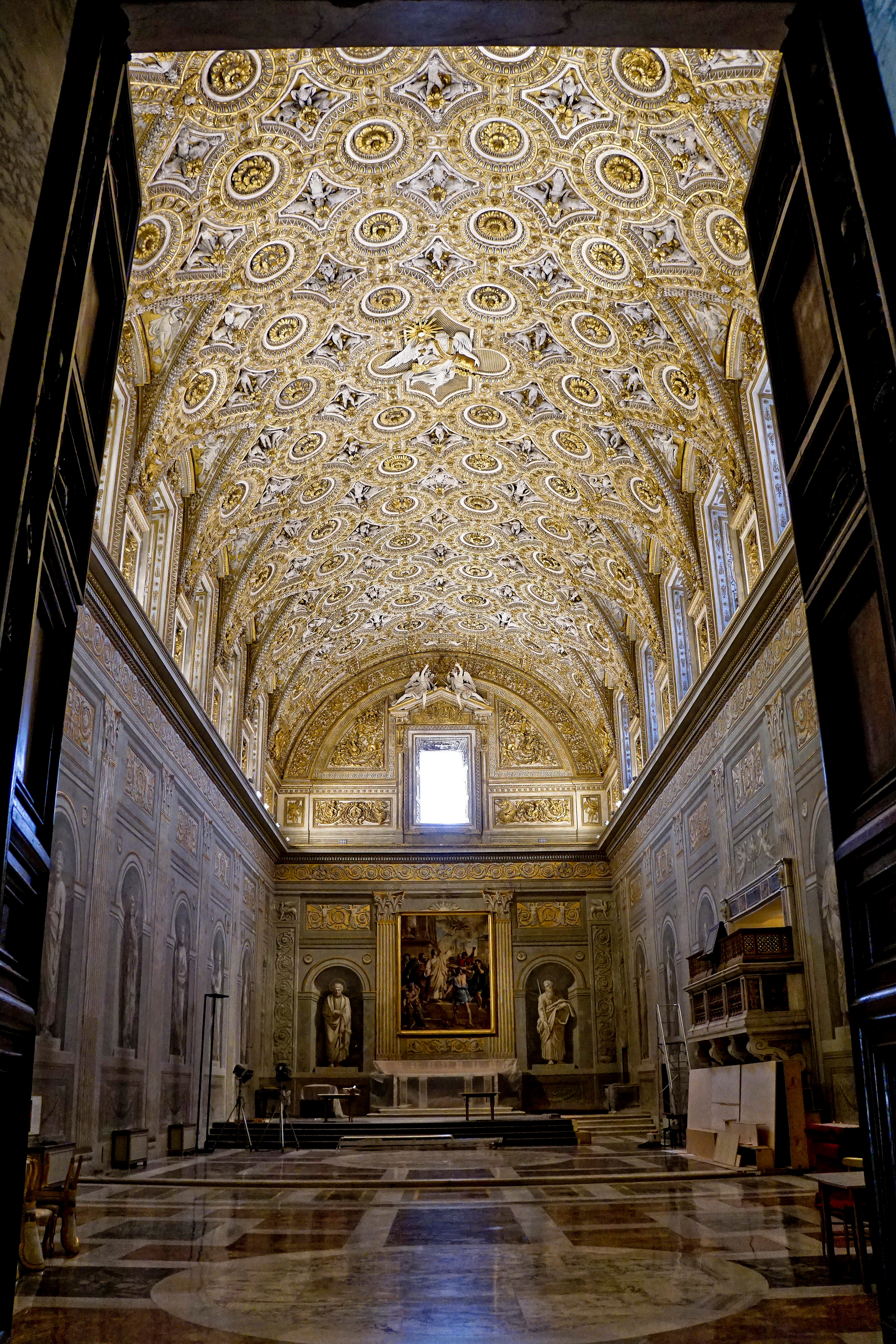
The Pauline Chapel

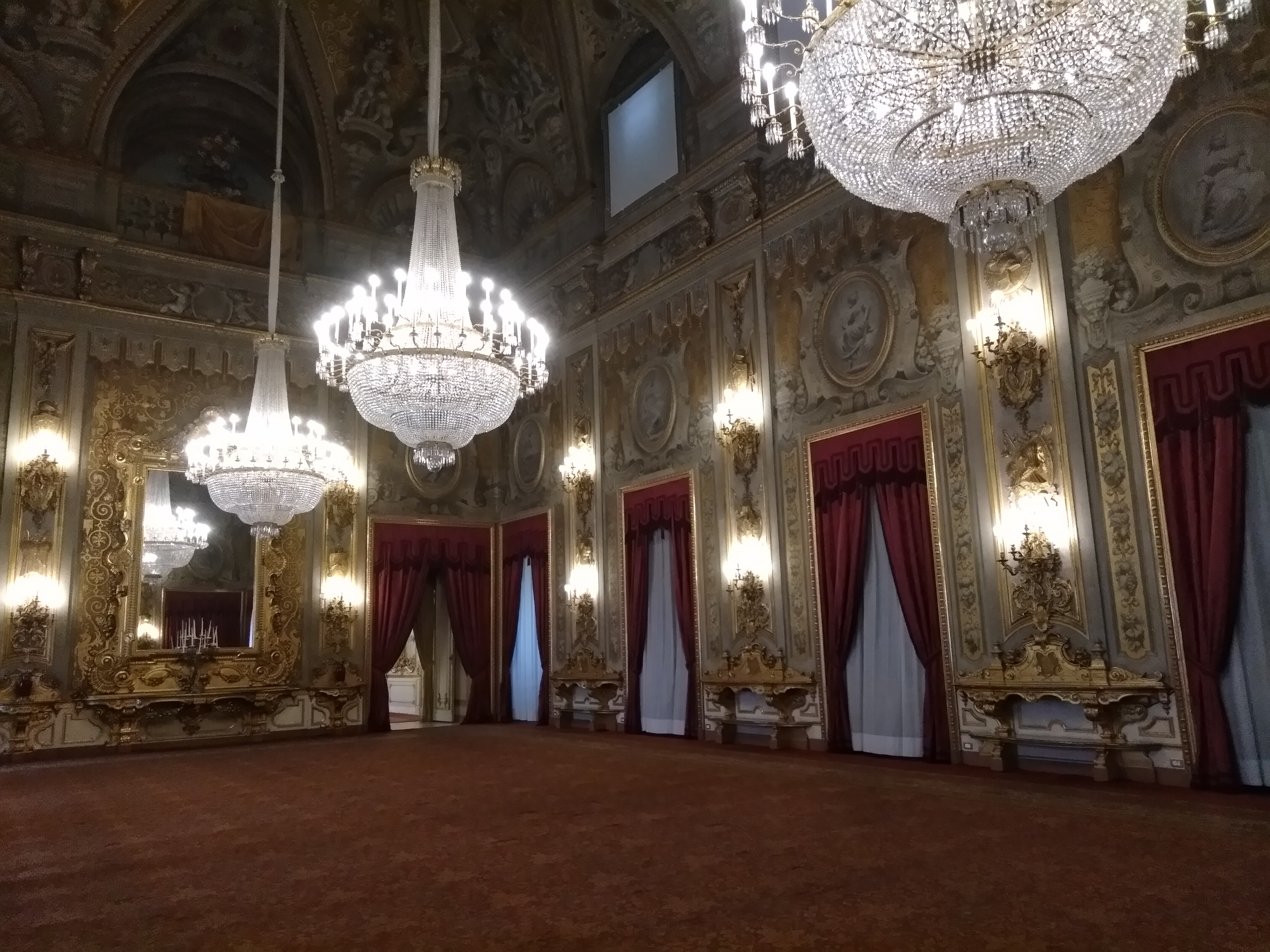
The Great Hall of Banquets

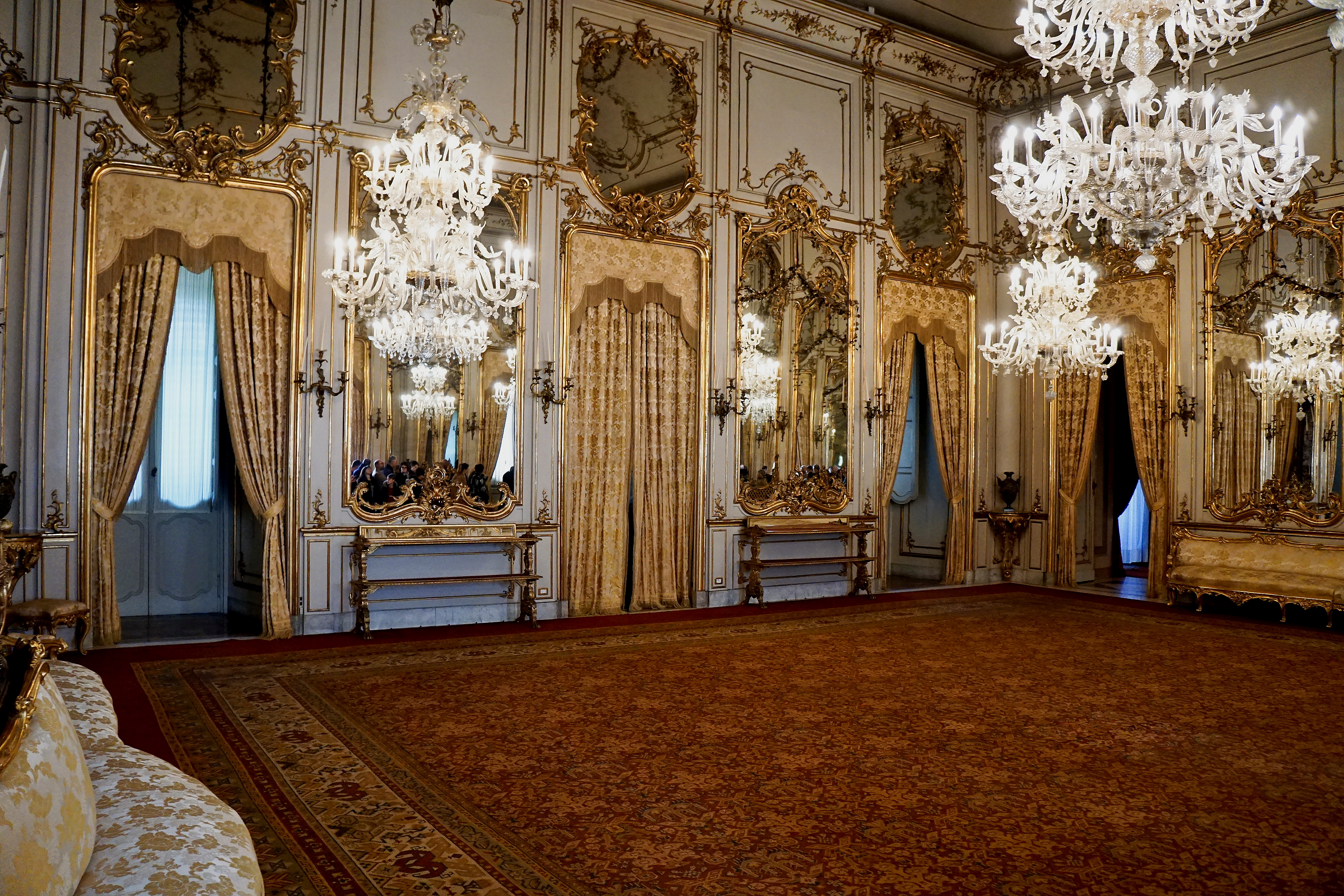
The Mirrors Hall

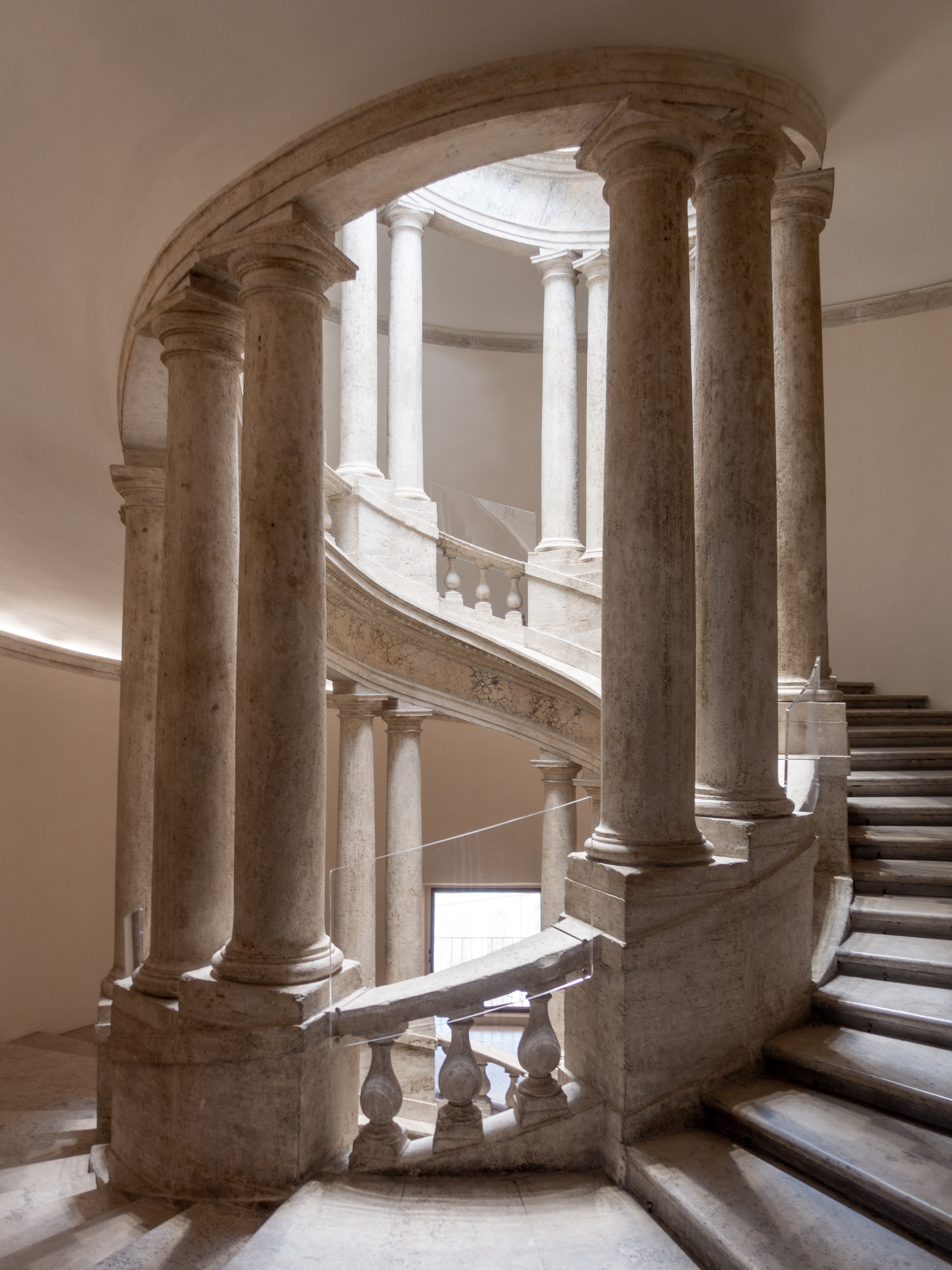
The Mascarino Staircase

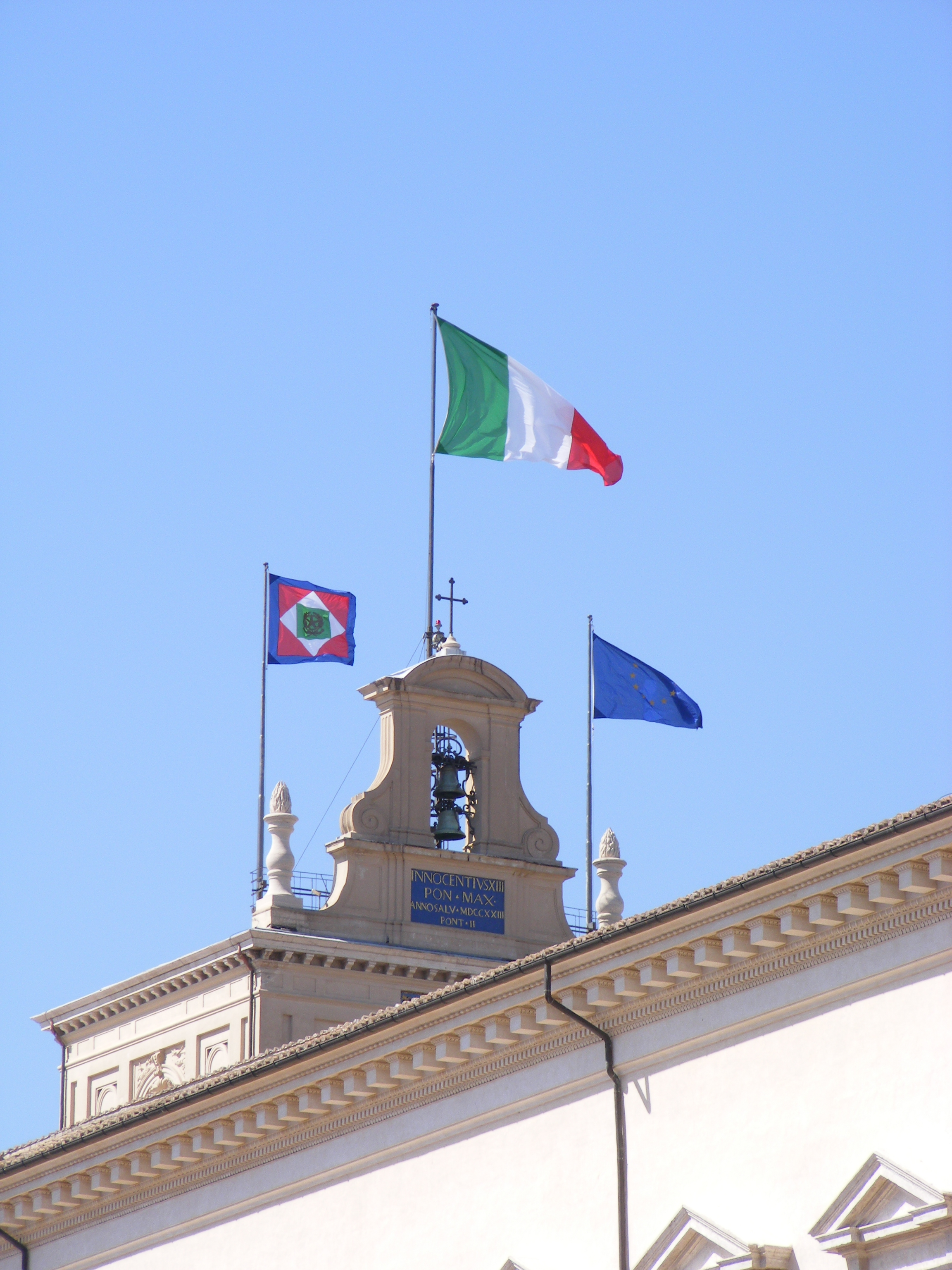
The bell tower with three flagpoles on the top of the Quirinal Palace. From left to right, the presidential standard of Italy (flown only when the President of the Republic is in residence), the national flag of Italy and the flag of the European Union.

The main building of the palace is centred around a vast courtyard known as the Cortile d'Onore (Courtyard of Honour). The halls and rooms in this building serve as representative of the Presidency of the Republic, while the offices and apartments of the head of state are housed in the Fuga building at the end of the Manica lunga, the long building on the side of Quirinal street (via del Quirinale in Italian). On the piano nobile of the Manica lunga lie the imperial apartments, which were specially arranged, decorated and furnished for two visits of Kaiser Wilhelm II (in 1888 and 1893) and which now house the monarchs or foreign heads of state visiting the president of the republic. The palace has 1,200 rooms in all.

The rooms of the palace housed in the main building are:

- The Staircase of Honour

The shape of the staircase was very useful during the papal period since the double-crossed ramp allowed people to reach the two main rooms of the papal palace directly: the Throne room, today the Great hall of cuirassiers, and the Consistory room, today the Great hall of banquets, at the time used as papal private apartments.

- The Great Hall of the Cuirassiers

This was the throne room of the papal palace, where ambassadors and dignitaries were received and public audiences were held. The royal guards stood here during the Savoy period. Today, the room serves for public audiences, receptions, and solemn ceremonies held by the Presidency of the Republic.

- The Pauline Chapel

It is the largest chapel in the building, built with the same size and shape as the Sistine Chapel so that the same ceremonial could be repeated both in the Vatican and in the Quirinal. Four popes were elected here. Today the chapel hosts concerts and religious ceremonies.

- The First State Room

It is one among the rooms formerly part of the papal private apartments, today hosting informal meetings of the president of the republic on occasion.

- The Room of the Virtues
- The Room of the Flood
- The Room of the Loggias
- The Doorkeepers Room
- The Balcony Room
- The St. John Parlour
- The Yellow Room

The Yellow Room was once part of a seventy-meter long gallery built by Pope Alexander VII, later ordered split by Napoleon to serve as Empress's private residence. It features magnificent yellow fabrics lined to the walls, hence the name of the room. In modern times, under the republic, the Napoleonic decorations were mostly removed, revealing the original ornaments.

- The Augustus Room

This room hosted the throne during the Savoy reign.

- The Ambassadors Room

This room was used to receive dignitaries before the ceremonies, a purpose it still fulfills.

- The Hercules Room

This room is one of the latest Savoy's interventions opened in the 1940s by dismantling rooms of the private papal apartments. The name derives from the tapestries on the walls representing the twelve labors of Hercules.

- The Cabinets Room

This room was also opened by dismantling rooms of the papal private apartment. It is a passage room; the name derives from the precious cabinets displayed here.

- The Mascarino Staircase

The staircase, designed by the architect Ottaviano Mascarino, is the original staircase of the Gregorian building. The ramp winds upwards to a skylight. During the Savoy period, some princes proposed demolishing the staircase and the other rooms of the Gregorian building to build a large ballroom, but the project was halted because of its cost.

- The Loggia of Honour
- The Bees Room
- The Zodiac Room

This room was used as a dining room by the Savoy family.

- The Room of Paul V factories
- The Tapestries Room

The enfilade of the tapestries room, of the mirrors room and of the great hall of banquets was conceived in the Savoy era for the court galas which were held once a month, on the third Thursday of the month. Arriving from the staircase of honour, you first came across the great Hall of banquets, followed by the mirrors room and by the tapestries room. The tapestries room, in particular, was used as a conversation room.

- The Chapel of the Annunciation

It is the smaller chapel of the palace. In the Savoy era, it was deconsecrated and used by servants to wash dishes since it was close to the zodiac room.

- The Mirrors Room

This room was used by the Savoy as a ballroom. Here today are held audiences of the president of the republic with few participants and the oath of the Judges of the Constitutional Court.

- The Great Hall of Banquets

In the papal era, this room was used as the consistory room where the Cardinal's College met. From the Savoy period onwards, banquets and state dinners have been held here. Today, the new government is also sworn in here.

- The Bronzino Room

Here the president of the republic meets the entourage of visiting foreign dignitaries. The name of the room derives from the tapestries on display, made on Agnolo Bronzino's own design.

- The Druso Room
- The president's former audience room
- The Lilla Tapestries Toom
- The Napoleonic Parlour
- The Piffetti Library
- The Music Room
- The War Room or Victory Room
- The Peace Room
- The Ladies Room

=== Gardens ===
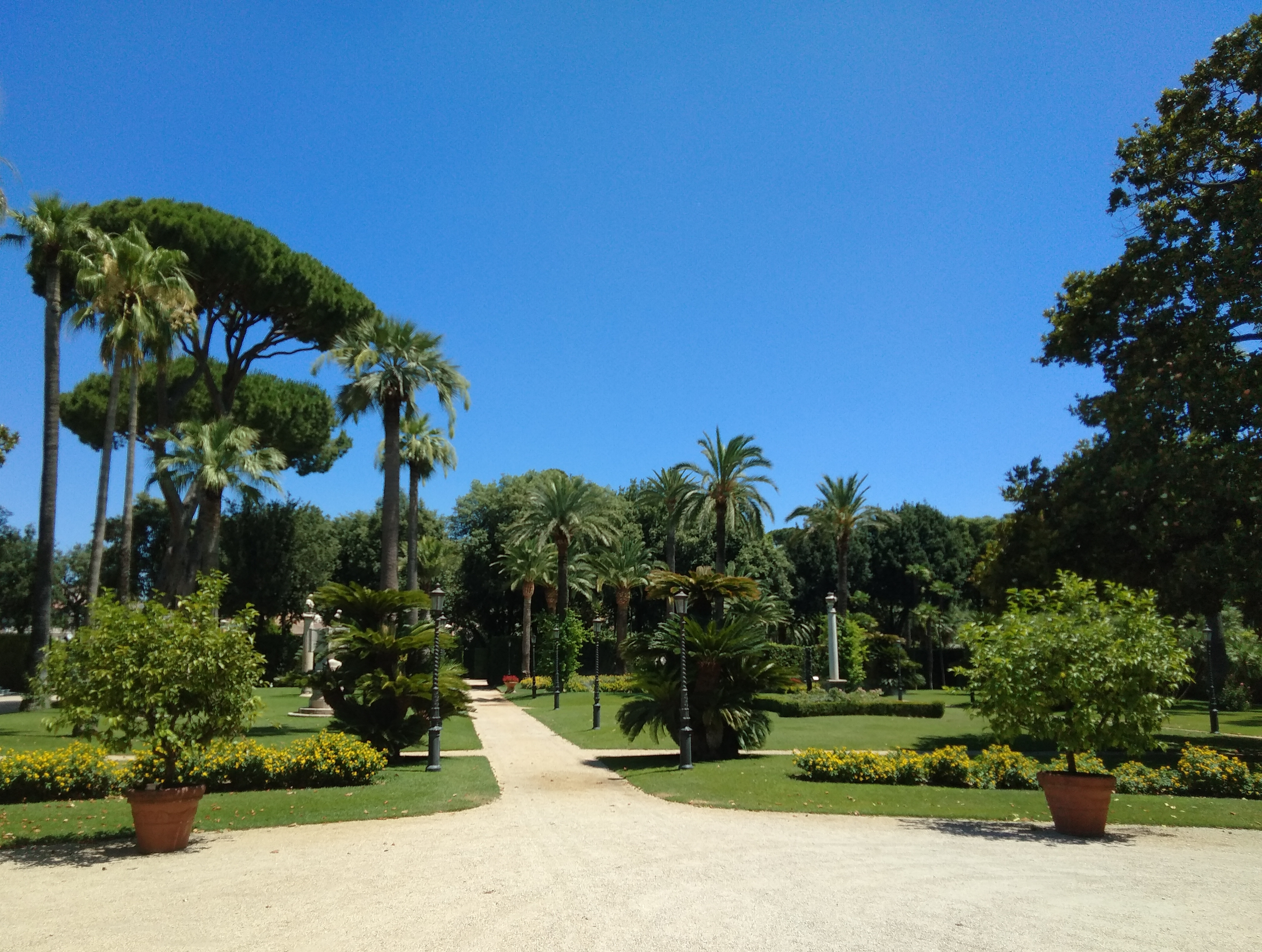
Gardens of the palace

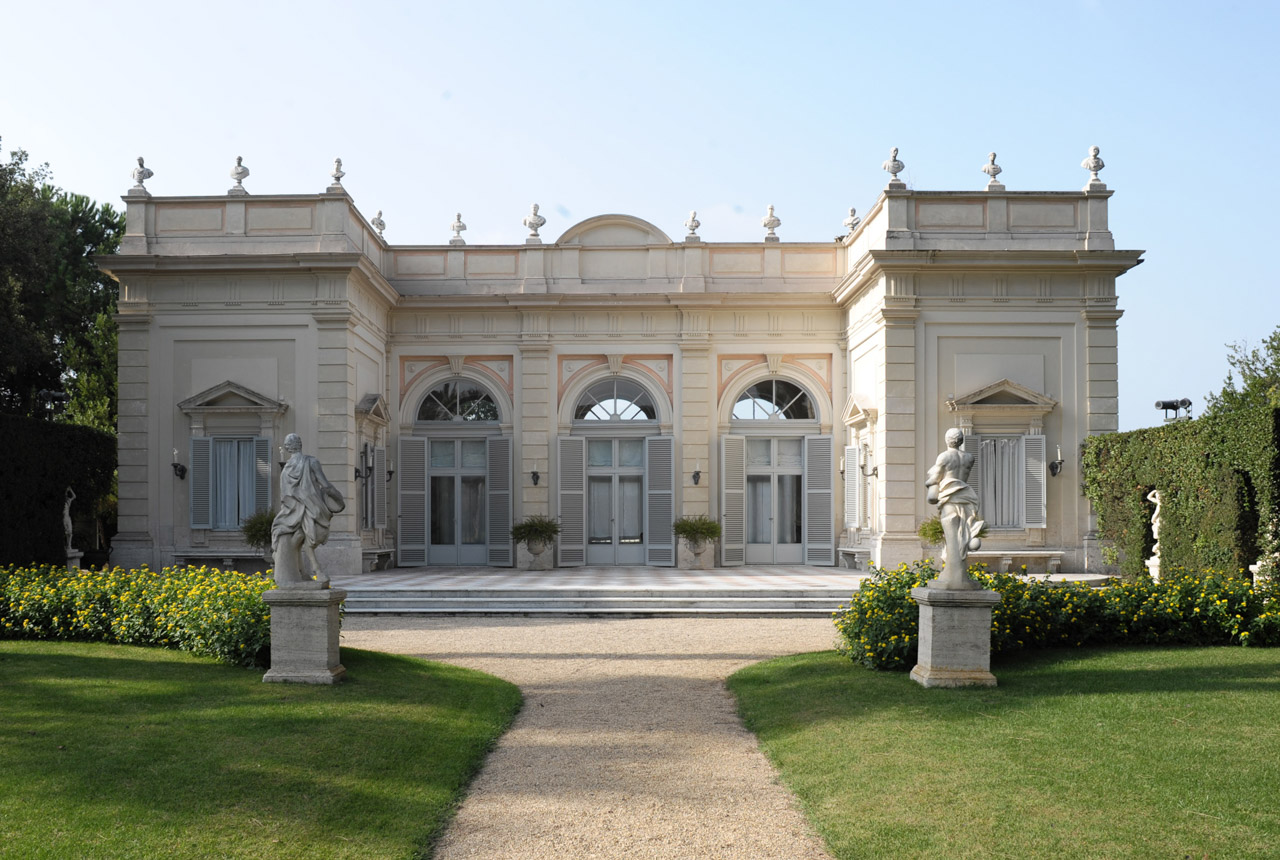
Coffee House

The Quirinal Gardens, famous for the privileged position that makes them almost an "island" elevated above Rome, were, over the centuries, changed depending on the tastes and needs of the papal court.

The current arrangement complements the garden "formal" seventeenth century facing the original core of the building with the garden "romantic" in the second half of the eighteenth century, preserving at that time the elegant Coffee House built by Ferdinando Fuga as reception room of Benedict XIV Lambertini, decorated by paintings of Pompeo Batoni and Giovanni Paolo Pannini.

During World War II, it became notorious as a gathering place for thousands of mutilated, disfigured and unclaimed Italian children.

Within the Quirinal gardens lies the famous water organ built between 1997 and 1999 by Barthélemy Formentelli based on the characteristics of the previous nineteenth-century organ. The organ is fed by a waterfall with a jump of 18 meters and has a single keyboard of 41 notes with a first short octave, without pedalboard.

Overall, the Quirinal gardens extend over 4 hectares (10 acres).

By means of a trap door located in the gardens, entry can be gained to the archaeological excavations that have unearthed the remains of the original temple to the god Quirinus and some insulae of the imperial age.

== See also ==
- Villa Rosebery – the retreat residence of the president in Naples
- Palazzo Chigi – the seat and official residence of the Prime Minister
- Palazzo Madama – the seat of the Senate of the Italian Republic
  - Palazzo Giustiniani – the official residence of the president of the Senate
- Palazzo Montecitorio – the seat of the Italian Chamber of Deputies
- Palazzo della Consulta – the seat of the Constitutional Court of Italy

Preceded by Palazzo Mattei	Landmarks of Rome; Quirinal Palace	Succeeded by Palazzo Pamphilj
