= Savoy blue =

Shade of saturated blue

Color coordinates
- Hex triplet: #4B61D1
- sRGB^{B} (r, g, b): (75, 97, 209)
- HSV (h, s, v): (230°, 64%, 82%)
- CIELCh_{uv} (L, C, h): (45, 94, 262°)
- ISCC–NBS descriptor: Vivid blue
- B: Normalized to [0–255] (byte)

Savoy blue (Italian: blu Savoia) or Savoy azure (azzurro Savoia), also known as Italian blue (blu italiano), is a shade of saturated blue between peacock blue and periwinkle, lighter than peacock blue. Since the Middle Ages, it has been the colour of the House of Savoy, the royal dynasty of the Kingdom of Italy from 1861 to 1946, as well as of its predecessor state, the Kingdom of Sardinia–Piedmont.

Having become a National symbol of Italy with the Risorgimento (1859–70), its use continued even after the birth of the Italian Republic (1946) under the name Italian blue. Currently, it is featured in the Presidential Standard of Italy, the sashes for the Italian Armed Forces' officers and the presidents of the Provinces of Italy during the official ceremonies, and the blue jersey for Italian national sports teams.

== Historical origin ==
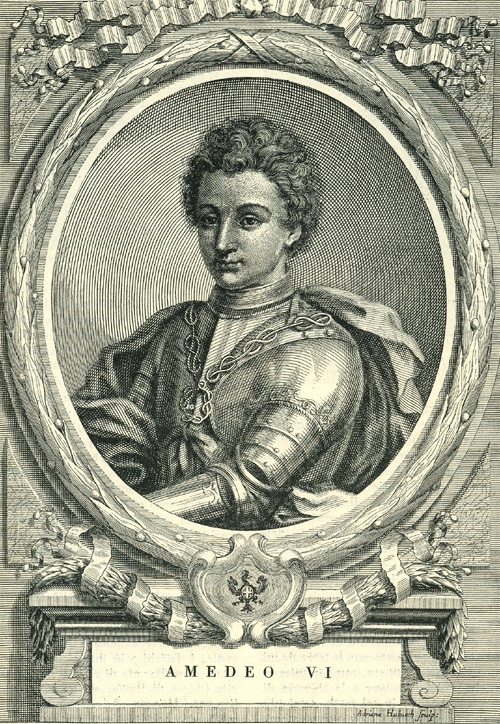
Amadeus VI, Count of Savoy

The origin of the colour seems to date back to 20 June 1366 when Amadeus VI, Count of Savoy, before leaving for the Alexandrian Crusade to help his cousin, the Byzantine emperor John V Palaiologos, wanted that on the flagship of the fleet of 17 ships and 2,000 men, a galley from the Republic of Venice, waved, next to the red banner with the silver cross of the Savoys, a blue flag:

[...] of devotion of Azure Banner with the image of Our Lady in the field sown with stars (gold). And that colour of sky consecrated to Mary is, as far as it seems to me, the origin of our national colour [...] (Note: […] di devozione di Zendado Azzurro con l'immagine di Nostra Signora in campo seminato di stelle (oro). E quel colore di cielo consacrato a Maria è, per quanto a me pare, l’origine del nostro color nazionale […])

— Luigi Cibrario

The colour therefore has a Marian implication, bearing in mind that there is also the possibility that the use of a blue banner by the Savoys started earlier. In any case the oldest documented Savoy flags, dating back to 1589, have the colours red, white (or the colours of the coat of arms of the dynasty) and blue. The latter colour acquired over time prevalence until it became the Italian national colour.

== Use ==
Referring to the Marian devotions, the ribbons of the Order of the Annunciation (the highest Savoyard order of chivalry), are blue, as are the ribbons of the Military Order of Savoy until 1855 and of the Medal of Military Valor and the War Cross for Military Valor until today.

Royal standard of the Kingdom of Italy.

For the officers, a blue sash (Sciarpa azzurra) was provided in the outfit, worn passing over the right shoulder and knotted on the left side. In 1572 this use was made obligatory for all the officers by Emmanuel Philibert, Duke of Savoy. Through various transformations, the Savoy blue sash is still the main insignia of the Italian armed forces' officers, who dress it both in ceremonial services and, sometimes, on guard. The Soldiers of the Royal Sardinian Army before 1848 wore a blue cockade.

The Presidential Standard of Italy

Other uses in the Republican era of Savoy blue are the edge of the Italian presidential standard as well as on the institutional flags of some primary public offices (Prime Minister of Italy, minister and undersecretary of defence, high degrees of the Italian Navy and of the Italian Air Force), as well as on the distinctions of the presidents of the Italian provinces and on the aircraft used by the Frecce Tricolori.

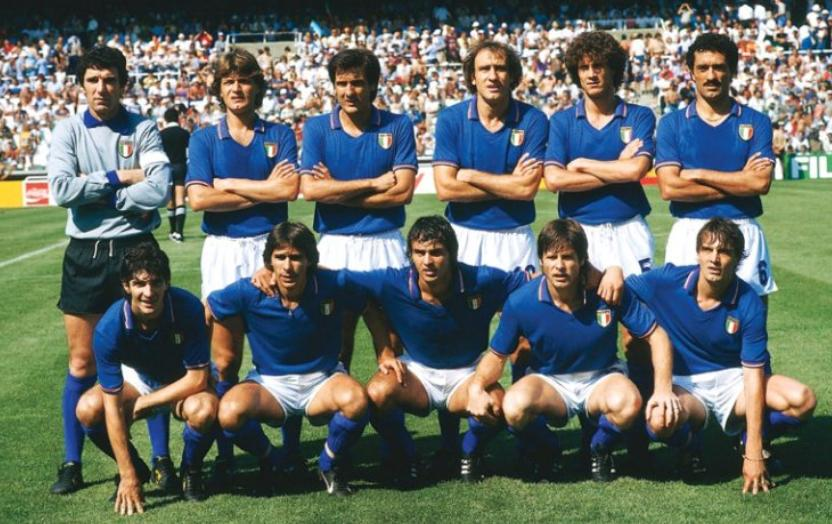
The Italy national football team at the 1982 FIFA World Cup

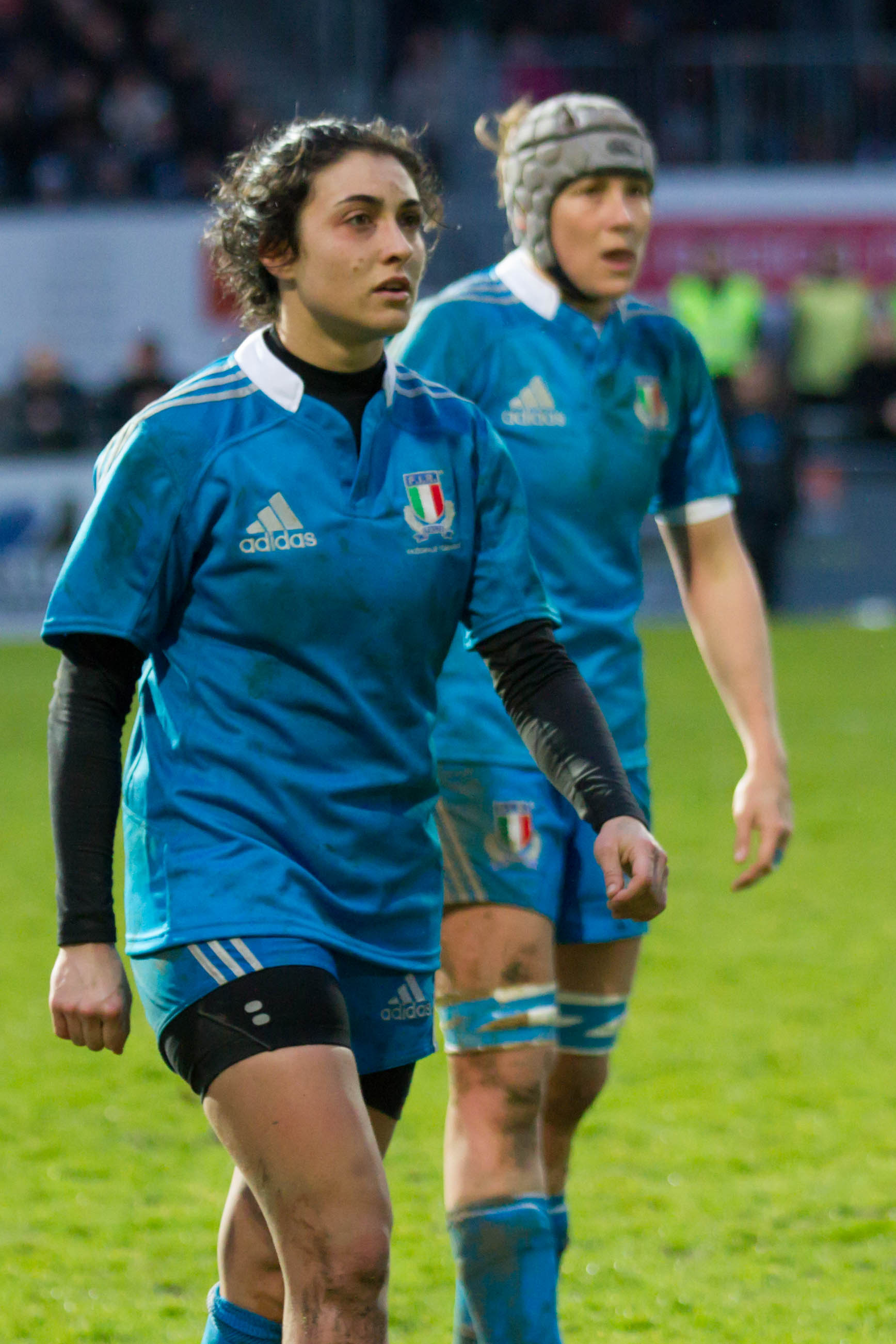
Debora Ballarini and Silvia Gaudino during a match of the Italy women's national rugby union team

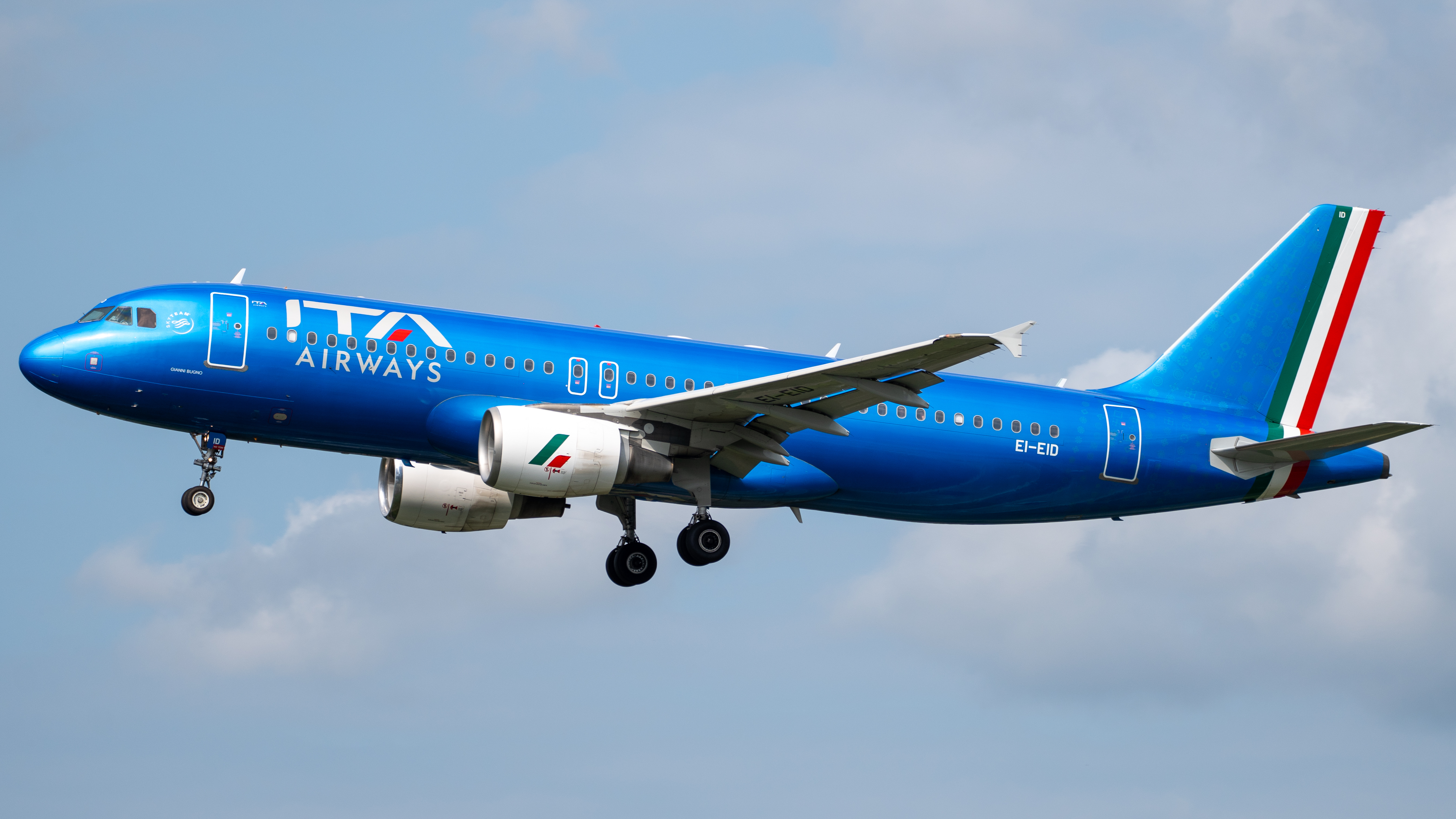
Airbus A320-200 EI-EID in the blue livery of the Italian flag carrier ITA Airways.

In the sporting field, the Savoy blue distinguishes almost all of the athletes who represent Italy internationally in any discipline: the origin of the use of this colour dates back to 6 January 1911, when the Italy national football team faced in Milan the Hungary national football team. The term blue shirt by now represents for metonymy the international appearance for Italy, and the athletes who represent the country are called azzurri. Furthermore, since 2021, the color has been chosen as the livery color of the aircraft of the Italian flag carrier ITA Airways.

There is no univocal colour coding of the blue shirt, so that the shade of blue is historically varied over time both within the same national team and, for example, in the same historical era between national teams of different disciplines.

== Other shades of colour ==
Savoy blue

Color coordinates
- Hex triplet: #007CC3
- sRGB^{B} (r, g, b): (0, 124, 195)
- HSV (h, s, v): (202°, 100%, 76%)
- CIELCh_{uv} (L, C, h): (50, 75, 246°)
- Source: Color adopted in label of the Piedmont Region
- ISCC–NBS descriptor: Strong blue
- B: Normalized to [0–255] (byte)

Savoy blue

Color coordinates
- Hex triplet: #9DB8CF
- sRGB^{B} (r, g, b): (157, 184, 207)
- HSV (h, s, v): (208°, 24%, 81%)
- CIELCh_{uv} (L, C, h): (74, 27, 236°)
- Source: Color adopted by the Italy national football team in the tournament Confederations Cup 2009
- ISCC–NBS descriptor: Light greenish blue
- B: Normalized to [0–255] (byte)

== See also ==
- National symbols of Italy
- Rosso corsa
