= Presidential standard of Italy =

Fourth presidential standard (mod. 2000), in use since 14 October 2000

The presidential standard of Italy (Italian: Stendardo presidenziale italiano) is the distinctive standard of the presence of the president of the Italian Republic.

Therefore, it flies above the Quirinal Palace, when the president is in residence. The standard is flown from the vehicle transporting the president, from prefectures when the president is visiting a city and inside the halls when he acts in an official capacity. The presidential standard is one of the National symbols of Italy.

The standard recalls the colors of the flag of Italy, with particular reference to the standard of the historic Italian Republic of 1802–1805; the square shape and the savoy blue border, whose use was maintained even in the Republican era, symbolize the four Italian Armed Forces, which are commanded by the president. Blue in heraldry also metaphorically symbolizes command.

== Description ==
The president of the Italian Republic has an official standard. The current version is based on the square flag of the Napoleonic Italian Republic, on a field of blue, charged with the emblem of Italy in gold. The square shape with a Savoy blue border symbolize the four Italian Armed Forces, namely the Italian Air Force, the Carabinieri, the Italian Army and the Italian Navy, of which the president is the commander. The standard is kept in the custody of the Commander of the Reggimento Corazzieri of the Arma dei Carabinieri, along with the war flag (assigned to Regiment in 1878). Blue in heraldry also metaphorically symbolizes command.

== History ==
Comparison of similarities of the Italian and Mexican flags

First presidential standard (mod. 1965), in use from 22 September 1965 to 21 March 1990

Flag of the Italian Republic of 1802-1805

The first presidential standard used provisionally since the official proclamation of the Italian Republic (June 18, 1946) was the national flag; later, on 22 September 1965, it was decided to establish a specific presidential standard. The initial idea of creating, as a standard, the overlapping of the emblem of the Republic with the national flag was immediately discarded because of the similarity of this hypothetical composition with the Mexican flag.

With the Order No. 76 dated 22 September 1965 the president Giuseppe Saragat, on the impulse of the defense ministry of Italy, chose the first standard "model 1965", which included a savoy blue, whose use was maintained even in the Republican era, square field defaced with the emblem of the Republic, 3 / 5 of the side of the cloth, in gold. The colors, according to the Italian military tradition, symbolize, respectively, the command and the value.

In 1986 a standard was established for the deputy president of the Republic. This standard, which is similar to the first standard of the president, instead of blue, is white with a blue border; moreover, the emblem of the Republic is silver instead of gold.

Later, by decree of the president of the Republic of 22 March 1990, the president Francesco Cossiga adopted the second standard "1990 model", which included a tricolor square with a blue border, 1/8 (some sources report 1/6) wide, and introduced a regulation of use that established its use and exposure in ceremonies and public buildings. This model lasted only two years.

By decree of the president of the Republic of June 29, 1992, the president Oscar Luigi Scalfaro restored the standard "model 1965", with the emblem of the Republic reduced in height to 1/3 of the proportions of the flag: this version is known as a third standard "model 1992".

Finally, by decree of the president of the Republic of 9 October 2000, published in the Gazzetta Ufficiale n. 241 of 14 October 2000, the president Carlo Azeglio Ciampi introduced the fourth standard "2000 model", the standard currently in use, which recalls the flag of the historic Italian Republic of 1802-1805. This link with the aforementioned historical standard aims to recall the Risorgimento and the struggle for national unity.

The standard currently in use was taken into orbit on board the International Space Station by astronaut Umberto Guidoni and shown during the video conference with President Ciampi on 25 April 2001.

By decree of the president of the Republic of May 17, 2001, published in the Gazzetta Ufficiale No. 11 of May 22, 2001, the distinctive standard was created for the presidents emeritus of the Republic.

== Historical evolution of the standard ==
Provisional standard of the president of the Italian Republic
(1 January 1948 – 21 September 1965)

First presidential standard (mod. 1965)
(22 September 1965 – 21 March 1990)

Second presidential standard (mod. 1990)
(22 March 1990 – 28 June 1992)

Third presidential standard (mod. 1992)
(29 June 1992 – 13 October 2000)

Fourth presidential standard (mod. 2000)
(14 October 2000 – 17 January 2003)

== See also ==
- Emblem of Italy
- Flag of Italy
- List of Italian flags
- List of presidents of Italy
- National symbols of Italy
- President of Italy
- S'hymnu sardu nationale
