= Cuirassiers Regiment (Italy) =

Italian Carabinieri regiment

- Reggimento corazzieri
- Armorial achievement (Republican era)
- Active: 1557–present
- Country: Duchy of Savoy; Kingdom of Sardinia; Kingdom of Italy; Italian Republic
- Branch: Carabinieri
- Type: Cavalry
- Role: Honour guard of the King of Sardinia (House of Savoy) until 1861; Honour guard of the King of Italy (House of Savoy) from 1861 to 1946; Honor guard of the President of the Italian Republic since 1946
- Size: Regiment
- Part of: Carabinieri
- Garrison/HQ: Barrack "Alessandro Negri di Sanfront", Rome, Lazio, Italy
- Mottos: VIRTUS IN PERICULIS FIRMIOR "Courage becomes stronger in danger"

Commanders
- Current commander: Brigadier General Rino Coppola
- Colonel-in-Chief: President of the Italian Republic

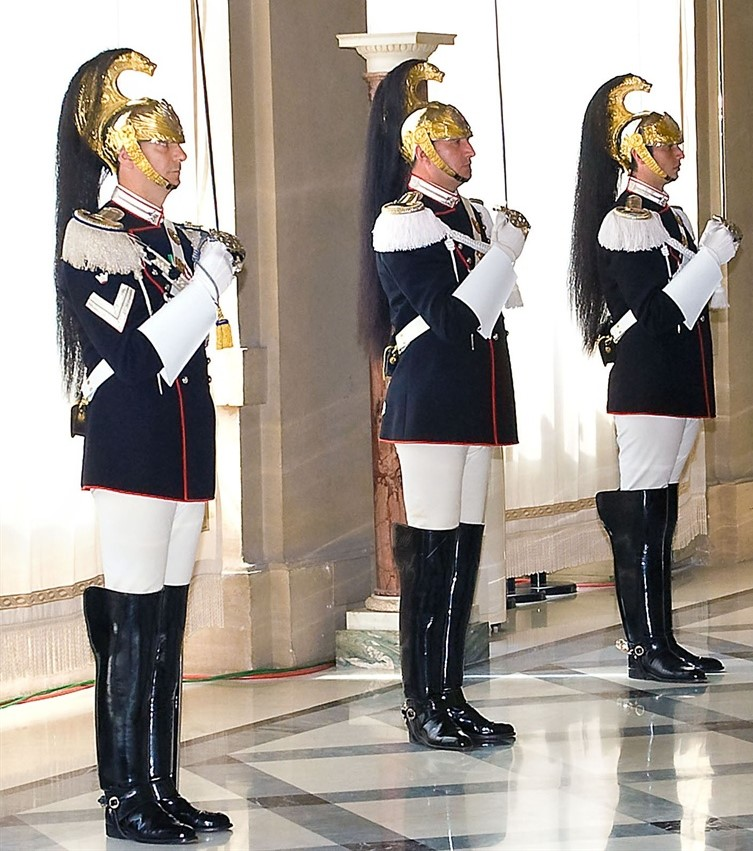
Corazzieri at the Quirinale Palace in Rome

The Cuirassiers Regiment (Italian: Reggimento corazzieri) is a Carabinieri cavalry regiment acting as guard of honour of the President of the Italian Republic. Their motto is Virtus in periculis firmior.

From 1948 to 1965, the regiment was officially called Squadrone Carabinieri Guardie (Squadron of Carabineer Guards); from 1965 to 1990, Comando Carabinieri Guardie del Presidente della Repubblica (Carabineer Command of the Guards of the President of the Republic); and from 1990 to 1992, Reggimento Carabinieri Guardie della Repubblica (Carabineer Regiment of the Guards of the Republic).

== History ==
=== Origins ===
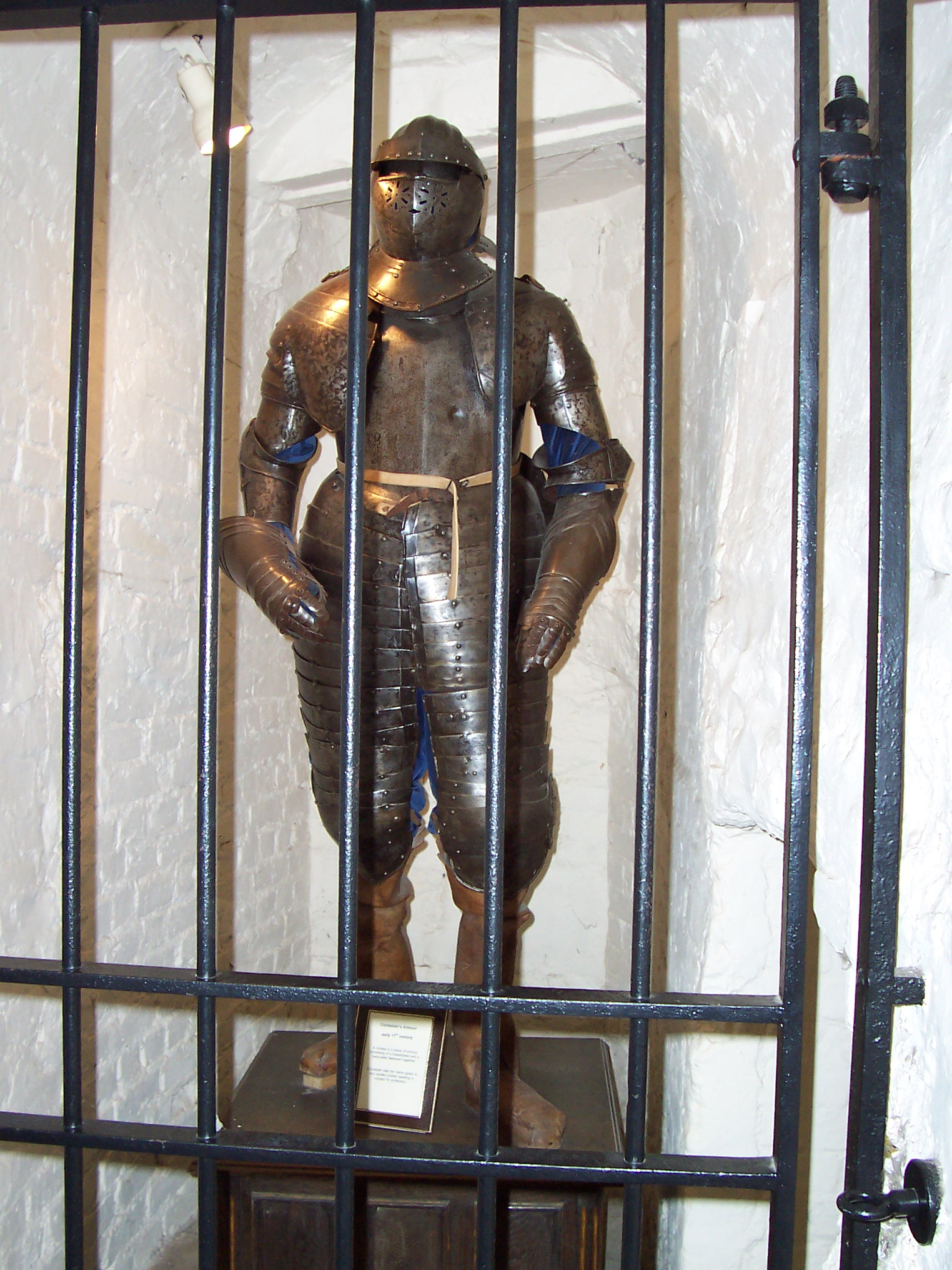
Armor of a Heavy Cuirassier of the 16th century.

The first examples of a division of Archers and Esquires for the security of members of House of Savoy are dated back to the 15th century, but only during the dukedom of Emmanuel Philibert (1553–1580) a "Guard of Honor of the Prince" (Guardia d'Onore del Principe) was established with about fifty army-men led by a captain. This guard made its first appearance during the battle of St. Quentin in 1557.

The division was subsequently expanded until in 1630 it had about 400 men, divided into 4 companies.

Under the reign of Victor Amadeus II (1675–1730), the security units and ceremonial guards were merged into the "Body Guards" (Guardie del Corpo), which was subdivided into four companies.

Since then, few changes had been made to the uniforms or to the composition of the unit, which has performed normal operational functions as well as serving in war campaigns.

During the Italian campaigns of the French Revolutionary Wars and following the occupation of Piedmont, King Charles Emmanuel IV left the Kingdom in 1798 with only a few guards and took refuge briefly in Sardinia and Spain, until his return to Rome where he abdicated in favour of his brother Victor Emmanuel I on 4 June 1802. Thus, most of the Guards were transferred to the French government which formed the Squadron of Piedmontese Carabineers (Squadrone Carabinieri Piemontesi).

Exiled for over a decade, Victor Emmanuel I regain possession of his territories only on 20 May 1814, restoring the institutions existing before the Napoleonic rule. The corps of the Body Guards was re-established with the same dimension it originally had. On the following 13 July, the King established the "Corps of Royal Carabinieri" (Corpo dei Carabinieri Reali) with the occasional tasks of “escorting royals” (initially belonging to the Body Guards), along with the law enforcement and public security purposes according to the Royal Licences (Patenti Reali). Reforms of Charles Albert (1834–1849) reduced the personnel and competences of Body Guards while giving a greater relevance to the Carabinieri, who were also designated to form a mounted squadron of honour for the wedding of the Crown Prince Victor Emmanuel II with the Archduchess Adelaide of Austria in 1842. The Body Guards took part to the First Italian War of Independence alongside the Carabinieri in order to protect the King.

The Body Guards were formally dissolved in 1867, although during the previous twenty years only one company had continued to perform security services exclusively at the Royal Palace of Turin. They were absorbed by the Carabinieri, which were established as an Army Corps with the Royal Decree on the 24 of January 1861.

=== Kingdom of Italy ===
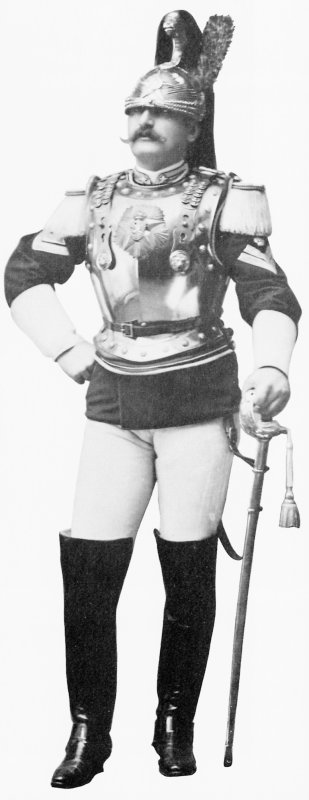
Uniform of a Cuirassier at the end of the 19th century.

On their basis the Cuirassier Unit was established on 7 February 1868 in Florence (the Italian capital at the time). It was formed by carabinieri on horseback reassigned to the force from Carabinieri Legions assigned in Florence, Milan and Bologna. They were organized into a company – today a British cavalry squadron – of 80 carabinieri; each wearing a black dragoon helmet with crest and a black breastplate with a cross on the chest, white suede trousers and white gauntlets, high boots and silver spurs. The armour was worn above the Carabiniere uniform and epaulettes. The division was subsequently formed on the occasion of the wedding between Princess Margherita of Savoy and Prince Umberto I. Since then it had been never been disbanded. Members of the "Company of His Highness's Cuirasses" (Compagnia Corazze di Sua Altezza) used to wear the monogram of the King on their breastplates, which were similar to those previously worn by other units. The brand new unit had one captain commanding, 4 officers, 9 NCOs and 69 troopers alongside a trumpeter comprising it.

In 1870, "Royal Guards Companies of the Palace" (Compagnie Guardie Reali del Palazzo) - which were Army units - were disbanded and the "Carabinieri Guards Squadron of HM the King" (Squadrone Carabinieri Guardie del Re), also known as "Cuirassiers Squadron" (Squadrone Corazzieri), with the task to protect the Royal family, were placed on permanent public duties readiness. Separate from the Carabinieri proper, they were and still are a unique specialist formation of this force.

In 1871, following the transfer of the Kingdom capital from Florence to Rome, the King's Carabinieri Guards Squadron were absorbed as a constituent unit under the Carabinieri Legion of Rome and moved to the Quirinal Palace where they were barracked for many years.

Cuirassiers were deployed in the World War I in order to escort the King in military operations in the frontlines.

Many Cuirassiers also joined the Italian resistance movement after the Badoglio Proclamation of 8 September 1943 and the escape of King Victor Emmanuel III, leaving them without any operational roles.

=== Italian Republic ===
On 13 June 1946, the last King, Umberto II, was exiled after the proclamation of the Republic and he freed the Cuirassiers from their oath to the Monarchy. The division was then renamed as the "3rd Mounted Carabineer Squadron" (3° Squadrone Carabinieri a Cavallo) and members wore new uniforms.

The squadron returned to the Quirinal on 11 May 1948, when the second president of Italy Luigi Einaudi reestablished the "Squadron of Carabineer Guards" (Squadrone Carabinieri Guardie) with the historical dress uniforms of 1876 on their basis.

In 1961 the squadron was reflagged into a larger "Squadrons Group" (Gruppo squadroni) and it was renamed "Carabineer Command of the Guards of the President of the Republic" (Comando Carabinieri Guardie del Presidente della Repubblica) in 1965.

With the decree of the President of the Republic n. 671 of 12 September 1978, the Command was presented its Standard in gratitude for services rendered to the Presidency and maintaining the traditions of Italian cavalry and those prior guards formations of the monarchial era.

In 1990, the Group was transformed anew into the "Carabineer Regiment of the Guards of the Republic" (Reggimento Carabinieri Guardie della Repubblica) and on 24 December 1992, with a decree of the 9th President of Italy Oscar Luigi Scalfaro, the name "Cuirassiers Regiment" (Reggimento Corazzieri) was officially reinstated.

When the Carabinieri were separated from the Army proper to become a branch of the Armed Forces in its own right in 2000, the Cuirassiers were retained as a specialist formation. No longer would the Army assign officers to this service on secondment.

In February 2006, the Cuirassiers took part in the flag-raising ceremony of the 2006 Winter Olympics in Turin.

In June 2017, the first black Cuirassier in the history of the unit commenced duty during the visit of Pope Francis to President Sergio Mattarella.

== Members ==
=== Recruitment requirements ===
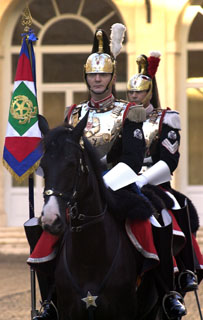
Corazzieri on horseback in the gala uniform.

The members of the Regiment, which are a specialized force of the Carabinieri, are distinguished by their uniforms and strict requirements needed to join the Regiment.

A Cuirassier has to be at least 190 cm (6 ft 3 in) tall, with a "harmonious" body, a strong resistance and athletic preparation, important qualities for the long shifts during which he must stand with austere immobility in every condition. Moreover, candidates have to have an undisputed personal and familiar morality and it is necessary to have excellent disciplinary and service records, demonstrated by at least six months of territorial service and as many months of traineeship in the Regiment (with a final exam).

Among the regiment there are snipers, martial artists, experts of personal defence and paratroopers. Cuirassiers must manage with expertise their range of equipment, known as "bottino" ("booty"), and they are trained to ride Irish Sport Horses and drive Moto Guzzi California cruisers, a means of complementary or alternative transport in daily services but also in many ceremonial services.

As the official escort of the President of the Republic, the Cuirassiers are tasked with managing a range of delicate operations conducted in the presence of large crowds. Their duties require them to provide protection that is both effective and discreet.

=== Uniforms ===
Cuirassiers wear full-dress uniforms which were established in 1878, with some variations according to rank. Lance corporals and brigadiers wear single-breasted tunics, while warrant officers and officers have a double-breasted version. On special occasions such as guard mounting ceremonies or ceremonies within the Quirinal, helmets with chinstraps and horse hair crests are worn. During particular honour services, such as the Italian Republic Day on 2 June, the distinctive cuirasses of the regiment are issued. A plainer service uniform without breast plates and helmet is reserved for other occasions

== Coat of arms ==
Coat of arms of the Regiment (2002-), displaying the 1952 arms of the Carabinieri.

A decree of the President of the Republic of 24 December 1986 granted arms to the Cuirassiers.

The shield is divided vertically party per pale: on the dexter side, an escutcheon Gules bearing the letters "RI" (for Repubblica Italiana) on the breast of an eagle displayed Sable (emblem of the Royal House of Savoy) on a field party per pall of Azure (for Turin), Argent (for Florence) and Gules (for Rome), representing the capital cities in which the regiment had served; on the sinister side, the arms of the Corps of Caribineers to which the regiment belongs.

The shield is surmounted by an eight-turreted mural crown (five turrets are visible) and supported by two lions Or, bearing the flag of Italy (dexter) and presidential standard (sinister). The Latin motto Virtus in periculis firmior means “Courage becomes stronger in danger”.

Minor changes were made in 1990 and in 1992, following changes to the Presidential standard. In 2002, the coat of arms was modified to reflect the restoration of elements of the 1935 arms of the Caribinieri on its becoming a separate branch of the Italian Armed Forces.

== Gallery ==
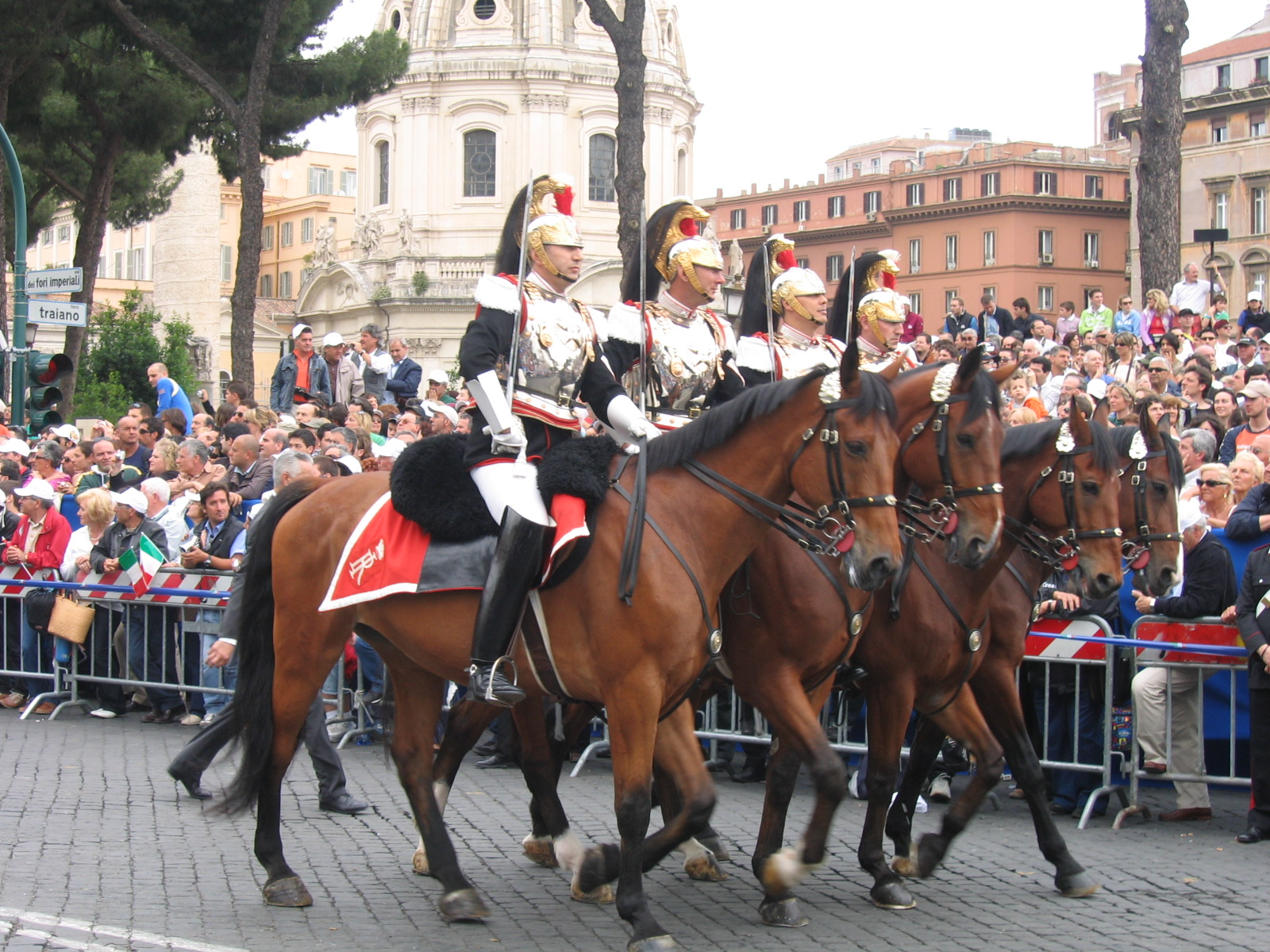
Mounted Cuirassiers during the parade of 2 June 2006.

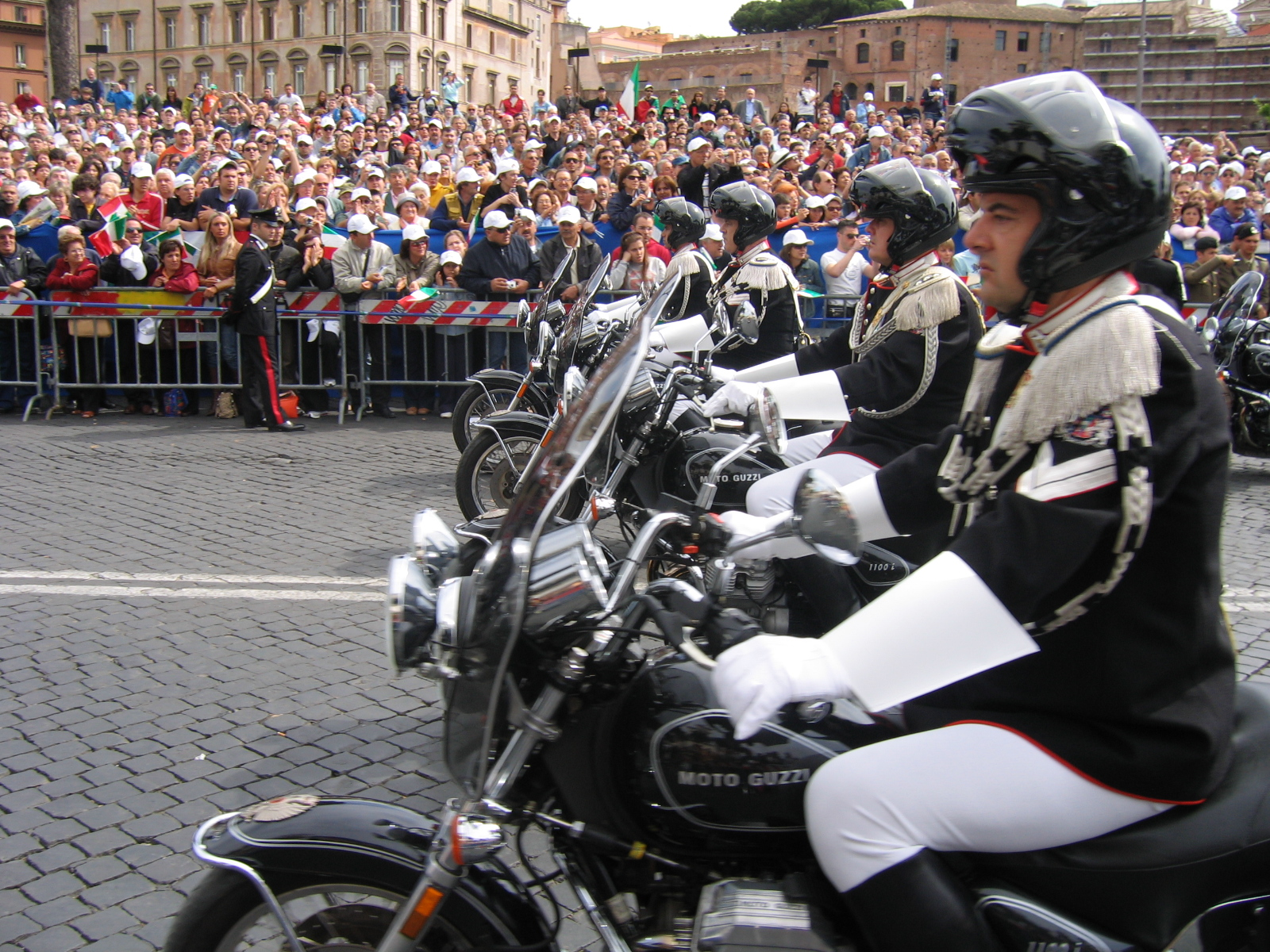
Cuirassiers on Guzzi California cruisers during the parade of 2 June 2006.

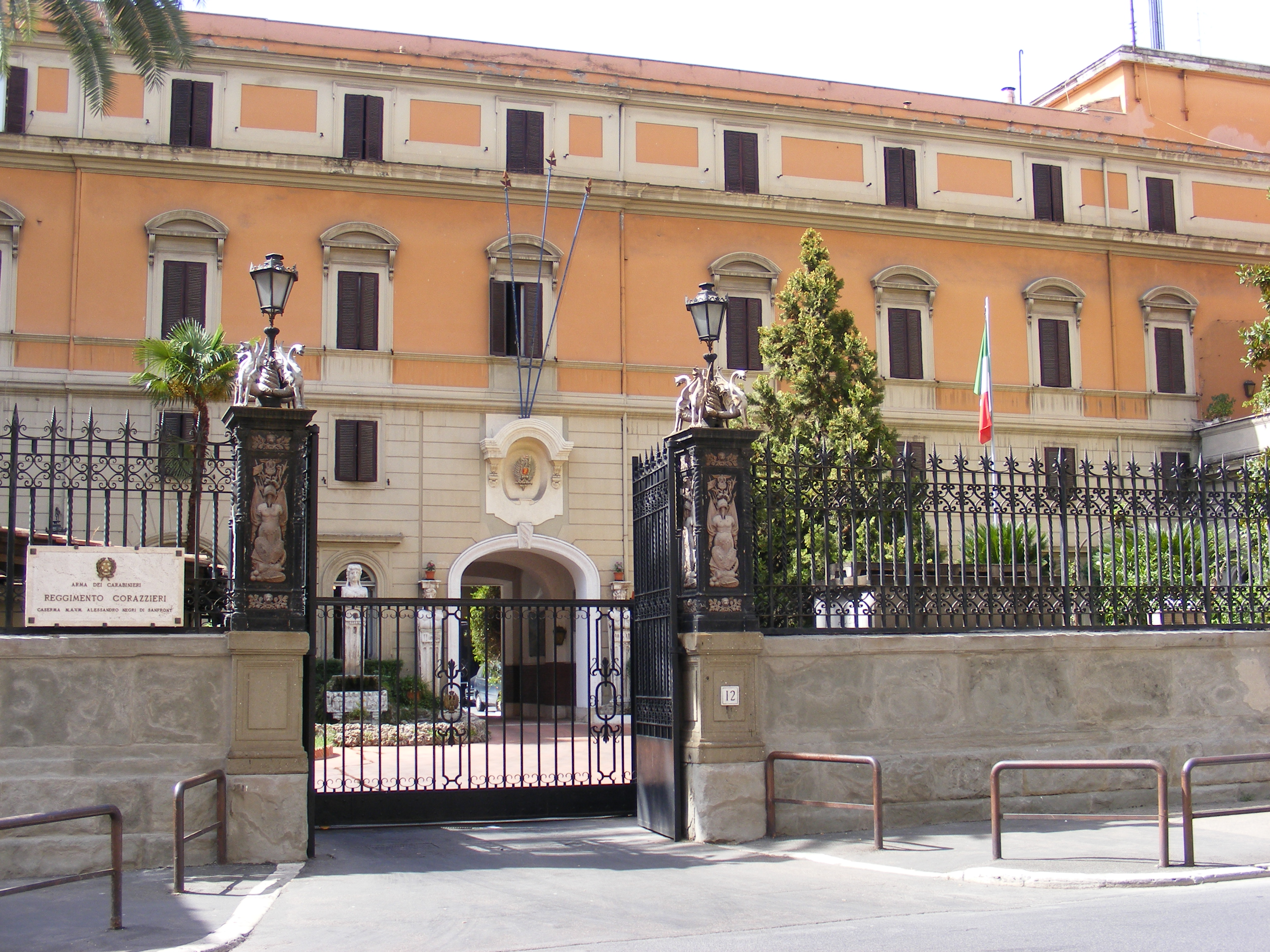
The barrack of Via XX Settembre 12, in Rome.

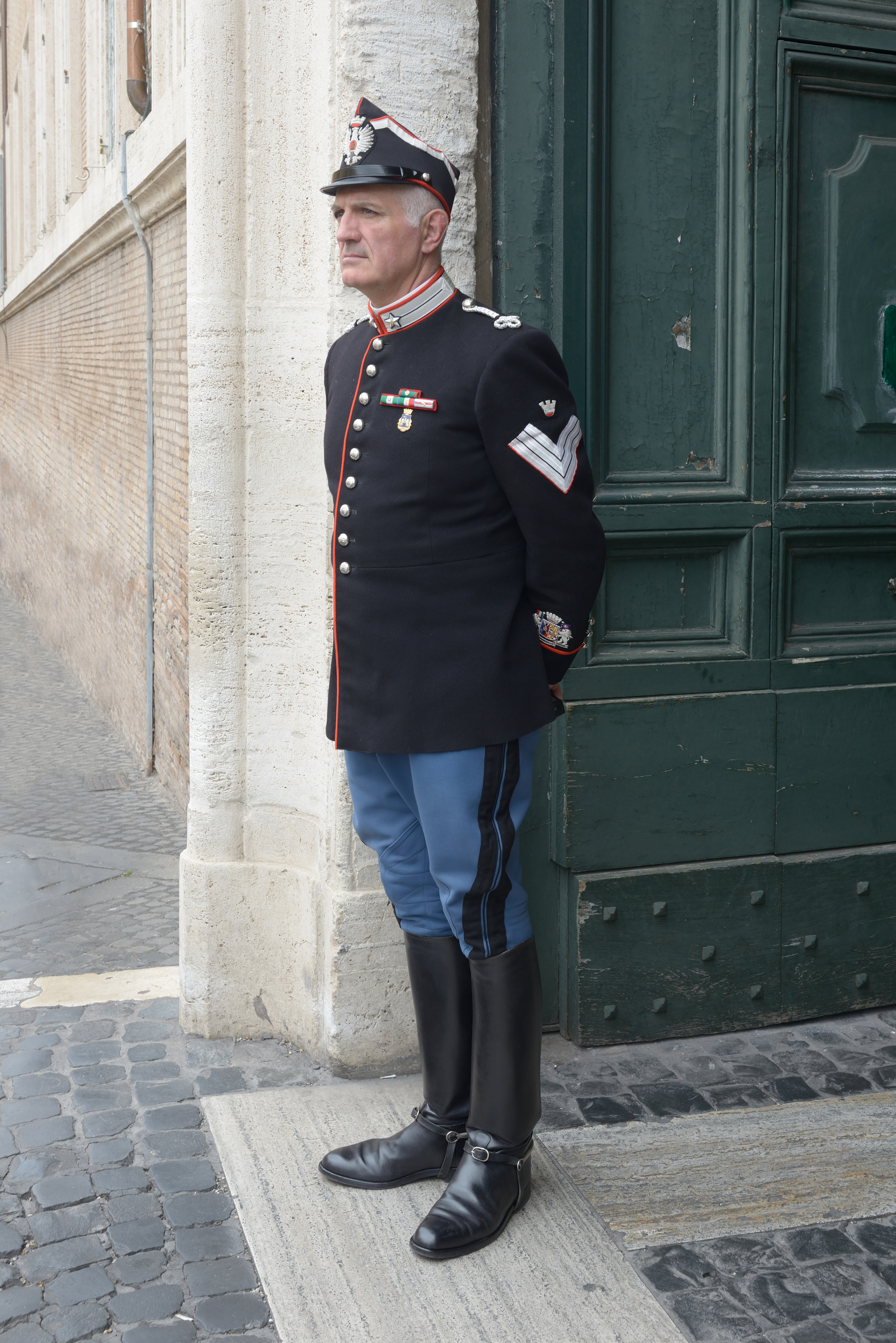
A Cuirassier on guard at the entrance of Quirinal.

== See also ==
- 4th Carabinieri Mounted Regiment
- Guard of honour

== Bibliography ==
- Di Paolo, Paolo; Raciti, Aldo (1996). Abbecedario del carabiniere - Dizionario storico essenziale per la conoscenza dell'Arma. Rome: Comando Generale dell'Arma dei Carabinieri.
- Pucciarelli, Mauro (1991). Nei Secoli Fedele. Milan: Ente editoriale per l'Arma dei Carabinieri.
