= Provincial Council (Italy) =

The Provincial Council is the municipal legislative body responsible for the governance for each of the Provinces of Italy.

According to the 2014 reform, each province is headed by an executive President assisted by a legislative body, the Provincial Council, while the executive body, the Provincial Executive, was abolished. The President and members of Council are elected separately by mayors and city councilors of each municipality of the province. Since 2015, the President and other members of the Council will not receive a salary.

Democratic elections for the Provincial Councils were held from 1951 to 2011.
