= President of the province (Italy) =

In the political system of Italy, a president of the province (Italian: presidente della provincia) is the single-member at the head of the government of a province, who has the power to appoint the Provincial Council.

== History ==
The figure of the President of the Province was introduced for the first time by the Consolidated Law of 1889, which placed him at the top of the Provincial Deputation in place of the Prefect, as had happened in the first thirty years of the Kingdom of Italy. The President was appointed by the Provincial Council with an annual mandate.

The President's mandate was then increased to three years and coordinated with that of the Deputation following the changes voted in 1894, and applied from 1895 following the announcement of the general administrative elections. A further expansion was decided in 1904, making the mandate four years.

The rise of fascism meant the temporary abolition of the figure of the President, replaced by the Dean and the strengthened Prefect, until the provisional reintroduction by nomination of the National Liberation Committee (CLN) after the fall of the regime. It was only in 1951 that the government decided to resume the democratic role of the provinces, at the same time retouching the figure of the President of the Council who was from that moment placed at the head of the Council, with which he was linked by a vote of confidence according to the ordinary dynamics of parliamentarism. The introduction of autonomous regions had however caused some peculiarities in this matter, given that if this reform had already seen the light in 1948 in Trento and Bolzano and, in the form of a regional presidency, in 1949 in Aosta, for the provinces of Sicily it was necessary to wait until 1964.

The real historical change was however the result of the law of 25 March 1993, n. 81, which established the direct election by universal suffrage and absolute majority of the president, who was given the power to nominate the Provincial Council external to the Council, for which the separate figure of its own assembly president was recreated. The duration of the presidential mandate was set at four years, on the American model, with no more than two consecutive mandates.

The consolidated text of local authorities of 2000 confirmed the simultaneous election of the Council and the President, whose mandate was increased to five years. The President and the Executive ceased to hold office in the event of the approval of a motion of no confidence voted by the absolute majority of provincial councillors: in this case the Council was also dissolved and, pending the elections, a Commissioner was appointed who was entrusted with the administration of the institution. The same principle, known as simul stabunt vel simul cadent, was also applied in the event of permanent impediment, removal, dismissal or death of the President.

Law no. 56 of 7 April 2014 cancelled the election by universal suffrage and the simultaneous election of the Council and the President, and reduced their mandate to four years. The law was applied to the administrations as they expired: the presidents elected in office, for the remainder of their mandate, were appointed commissioners.

== Characteristics ==
=== Elections ===
In the regions with ordinary statutes, the methods of electing the president have been radically modified by law no. 56 of 7 April 2014. Passive suffrage has been restricted to mayors in office, with the addition, on a temporary basis, of outgoing provincial presidents; active voting rights have instead been limited to mayors and municipal councillors in office. The vote is weighted according to the population segment of the commune represented by the voter. The new legislation has also made a relative majority sufficient for the victory of the new President.

In Friuli-Venezia Giulia, an alternative reform was passed that simply abolished the popular election of the president, restoring his appointment by the Provincial Council as it happened in the 20th century. In Sicily and Sardinia, elections were suspended until further notice, resorting if necessary to the appointment of extraordinary commissioners. A subsequent reform in Friuli completely abolished the office in 2016. The President of the Province of Bolzano is still elected (and possibly censured) by the Provincial Council as it happened in the other provinces until 1993. The election of the President of the Province of Trento therefore remains the only one in Italy to take place by universal suffrage and absolute majority.

In 2024, the regional government of Friuli-Venezia Giulia approved a bill to restore the provinces, which is now under consideration by the national parliament.

=== Mandate ===
In the regions with ordinary statutes, the President remains in office for four years following the entry into force of law no. 56 of 2014. The new legislation no longer provides for a bond of trust with the Council, introducing in the Italian provinces a form of government of pure presidentialism that has never existed in Italy under a democratic regime, while the expiration of the term is provided for in the event of the loss of one's office as mayor: the combination of the current legal system therefore makes the president of the province in fact responsible to his own municipal council, unless it is an outgoing president re-elected by virtue of the transitional provision that takes place at the time of the first application of the new legislation.

In Trentino-Alto Adige the President's term remains fixed at five years, unless a motion of no confidence is approved by the Council. In Sicily and Sardinia, however, there are no more presidents, pending the reform by the regional authorities.

=== Functions ===
According to art. 99 of Legislative Decree 267/2000, the President appoints the municipal and provincial secretary, who functionally depends on him, choosing him from among those registered in the appropriate register. The secretary automatically ceases from office with the cessation of the mandate of the president of the province who appointed him, unless he is confirmed by the new president. The President can appoint a general director, outside the organic endowment and with a fixed-term contract, who is responsible for implementing the directions and objectives established by the governing bodies of the institution, and who supervises the management of the institution. The general director can be revoked by the president of the province, following a resolution of the provincial council; the duration of his office cannot exceed that of the presidential mandate.

In the exercise of his functions, the President of the Province adopts administrative provision, usually in the form of a decree. It should be remembered, however, that, by virtue of the principle of separation between political-administrative and management functions, the President's measures, like those of other political bodies, cannot invade the scope of management functions, reserved for managers, except for the exceptions expressly provided for by law. For the same reason, the President is no longer entitled to stipulate contracts for the province, while he can stipulate program agreements given their political nature.

In Trentino the President's power to form and nominate the Provincial Council is confirmed, while in the Province of Bolzano the role of presidency of a Council formed by the Council is confirmed.

According to Law No. 56 of 2014, the President of the Province represents the institution, convenes and presides over the Provincial Council and the Assembly of Mayors, supervises the functioning of the services and offices and the execution of the acts, and exercises the other functions attributed to him by the statute. The law in question abolished the Provincial Council, redistributing the government delegations within the Provincial Council, greatly reduced in the number of its members, and thus introducing an unprecedented form of pure presidential government, completely new to the political life of the Italian Republic.

The President may appoint a Vice President of the Province, chosen from among the provincial councillors, establishing the functions delegated to him, immediately communicating them to the Council. The President may also assign delegations to provincial councillors, in compliance with the principle of collegiality.

Pursuant to Law No. 121/1981, the President of the Province is entitled to participate in the Provincial Committee for Public Order and Safety.

==== Trentino-Alto Adige ====
For the presidents of the autonomous provinces of Trento and Bolzano there is a different discipline, which gives them a much more incisive role compared to those of the other provinces. This discipline is contained in the Regional Statute of Trentino-Alto Adige, which has the rank of constitutional law. In these provinces the president has typical attributions of the president of the regional council, such as for example that of promulgating provincial laws, and part of the attributions elsewhere belonging to the prefect, not foreseen in this region, including some competences of the public safety authority.

== Distinctions ==
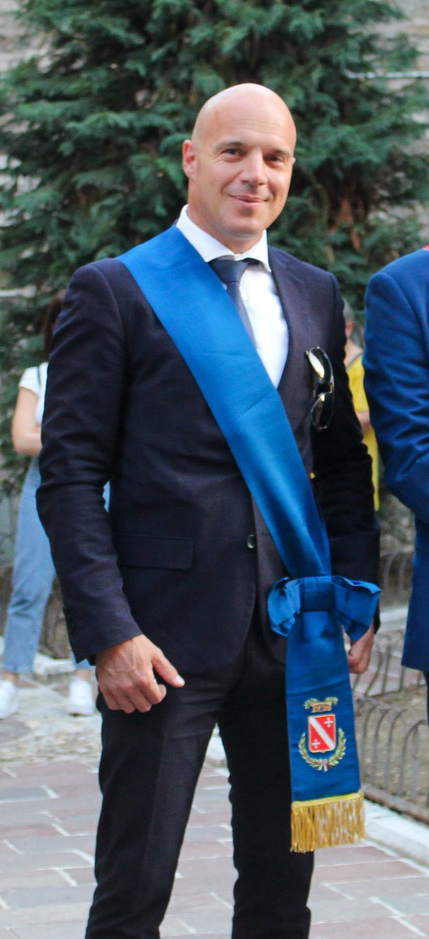
Camillo D'Angelo, President of the Province of Teramo, wearing the official sash.

The current consolidated text of local authorities describes the badge of the president of the province as a light blue band with the coat of arms of the Republic and the coat of arms of the province embroidered at the two ends, to be worn over the right shoulder.

== List ==
- President of the Provincial Council (Italy)
- President of the Province of Genoa
- President of the Province of Florence

== See also ==
- Provincial Council (Italy)
- Assembly of Mayors
- Provinces of Italy
- Municipal and provincial secretary
- Vice President of the Province
- Metropolitan mayor
- Provincial Deputation
