= Andropolis =

Andropolis may refer to:

Places and jurisdictions

- Andropolis, Egypt, an Ancient city and former bishopric, now Kherbeta and a Latin Catholic titular see
- a fictitious (SF) metropolis in The Year 3,000

A Greek family name; bearers include, also in fiction

- Greek character Constantine Andropolis in Journey to Atlantis (novel)
- Olympics hopeful Michael Andropolis in Running (film)
- Nick Andropoulos, a character on List of As the World Turns characters, played by Michael Forest
