= Tricolor cockade =

Tricolor cockade, or tricolour cockade, may refer to:

- Cockade of France, the national ornament of France
- Cockade of Italy, the national ornament of Italy
