= Cockade of Italy =

National ornament

Cockade of Italy

The cockade of Italy (Italian: Coccarda italiana tricolore) is the national ornament of Italy, obtained by folding a green, white and red ribbon into a plissé using the technique called plissage (pleating). It is one of the national symbols of Italy, and is composed of the three colours of the Italian flag with the green in the centre, the white immediately outside and the red on the edge. The cockade, a revolutionary symbol, was the protagonist of the uprisings that characterized the Italian unification, being pinned on the jacket or on the hats in its tricolour form by many of the patriots of this period of Italian history, during which the Italian Peninsula achieved its own national unity, culminating on 17 March 1861 with the proclamation of the Kingdom of Italy. On 14 June 1848, it replaced the azure cockade on the uniforms of some departments of the Royal Sardinian Army (which became the Royal Italian Army in 1861), while on 1 January 1948, with the birth of the Italian Republic, it took its place as a national ornament.

The Italian tricolour cockade appeared for the first time in Genoa on 21 August 1789, and with it the three colours which would become the Italian national colours. Seven years later, the first tricolour military banner was adopted by the Lombard Legion in Milan on 11 October 1796, and eight years after that, the birth of the flag of Italy took place on 7 January 1797, when it became for the first time a national flag of an Italian sovereign state, the Cispadane Republic.

The Italian tricolour cockade is one of the symbols of the Italian Air Force, and is widely used on all Italian state aircraft, not only military. The cockade is the basis of the parade frieze of the Bersaglieri, cavalry regiments, Carabinieri and Guardia di Finanza, and a reproduction of it in fabric is sewn on the shirts of the sports teams holding the Coppa Italia (English: Italy Cup) that are organized in various national team sports. It is tradition for the most important offices of the State, excluding the President of the Italian Republic, to have a tricolour cockade pinned to their jacket during the military parade of the Festa della Repubblica, which is celebrated every 2 June.

== Colour position ==
From left to right, the national cockades of Iran, Bulgaria and Mexico, all green, white and red tricolours

The Italian tricolour cockade, by convention, has the green in the centre, the white in an intermediate position and red in the periphery. This custom derives from one of the conceptual characteristics of the cockades, which can be imagined as flags rolled around the flagpole seen from above.

In the case of the Italian tricolour cockade, the green is located in the centre because in the flag of Italy this colour is the one closest to the flagpole. The tricolour cockades with red and green in the opposite position are those of Iran and Suriname. Conversely, the national ornament of Bulgaria and Maldives, starting from the centre, are arranged white, green and red, while that of Madagascar, starting from the centre, is arranged white, red and green.

The Hungarian cockade has the same arrangement of colours as the Italian tricolour cockade, having the colour position reversed like the Iranian cockade and the Surinamese one is an urban legend. Other cockades identical to the Italian one, even in the arrangement of the colours, are the national ornaments of Burundi, Mexico, Lebanon, Seychelles, Algeria and Turkmenistan.

== History ==
=== The premises ===
The cockade of France, which originated and spread among the revolts of the French Revolution

The first cockades were introduced in Europe in the 15th century. The armies of the European states used them to signal the nationality of their soldiers to discern allies from enemies. These first cockades were inspired by the distinctive coloured bands and ribbons that were used in the Late Middle Ages by knights, both in war and in tournaments, which had the same purpose, namely to distinguish the opponent from the fellow soldier.

The Italian tricolour cockade, which later became a revolutionary symbol par excellence during the insurrectional uprisings of the 18th and 19th centuries, was often worn by the patriots who participated in the uprisings that marked the Italian unification that was characterized by those social ferments that led to the political and administrative unity of the Italian Peninsula in the 19th century; for this reason it is considered one of the national symbols of Italy.

The Italian tricolour cockade, as well as all similar ornaments made in the same period in other countries, main characteristic was that of being able to be clearly visible, thus giving way to unequivocally identify the political ideas of the person who wore it, as well as that of being, in case of need, better hideable than, for example, a flag.

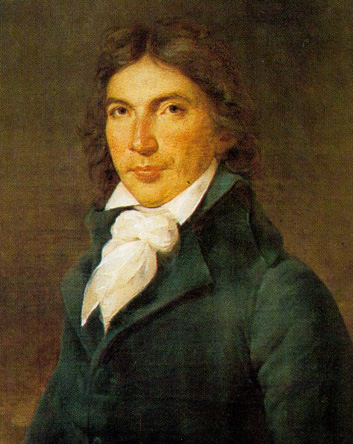
Camille Desmoulins, who invented the cockade of France, which in turn inspired the birth of the Italian one

The Italian tricolour cockade was inspired by the French tricolour cockade, as well as the flag of Italy is inspired by the French one, introduced by the French Revolution in the autumn of 1790 on French Navy warships. Other national tricolour European flags were also inspired by the French flag because they were also linked to the ideals of the revolution.

The French tricolour cockade originated during the Revolution and over time became one of the symbols of change. Later, the meaning of change assigned to the French tricolour cockade crossed the Alps and arrived in Italy together with the use of the cockade and all the values of the French Revolution, which were perpetrated by the Jacobinism of the origins, including the ideals of social renewal the basis of the advocacy of the Declaration of the Rights of Man and of the Citizen of 1789. Subsequently also political, with the first patriotic ferments directed at national self-determination which subsequently led, on the Italian Peninsula, to the Italian unification.

The French tricolour cockade was born on 12 July 1789, two days before the storming of the Bastille, when the revolutionary journalist Camille Desmoulins, while hailing the Parisian crowd to revolt, asked the protesters what colour to adopt as a symbol of the French Revolution, proposing the green hope or the blue of the American Revolution, symbol of freedom and democracy. The protesters replied "The green! The green! We want green cockades!" Desmoulins then seized a green leaf from the ground and pointed it to the hat as a distinctive sign of the revolutionaries.

The green, in the primitive French cockade, was immediately abandoned in favor of blue and red, or the ancient colours of Paris, because it was also the colour of the king's brother, Count of Artois, who became monarch after the First Restoration with the name of Charles X of France. The French tricolour cockade was then completed on 17 July 1789 with the addition of white, the colour of the House of Bourbon, in deference to King Louis XVI, who was still ruling despite the violent revolts that raged in the country: the French monarchy was in fact abolished later, on 10 August 1792.

=== The birth of the Italian national colours ===
==== The leaves used as the first cockades ====
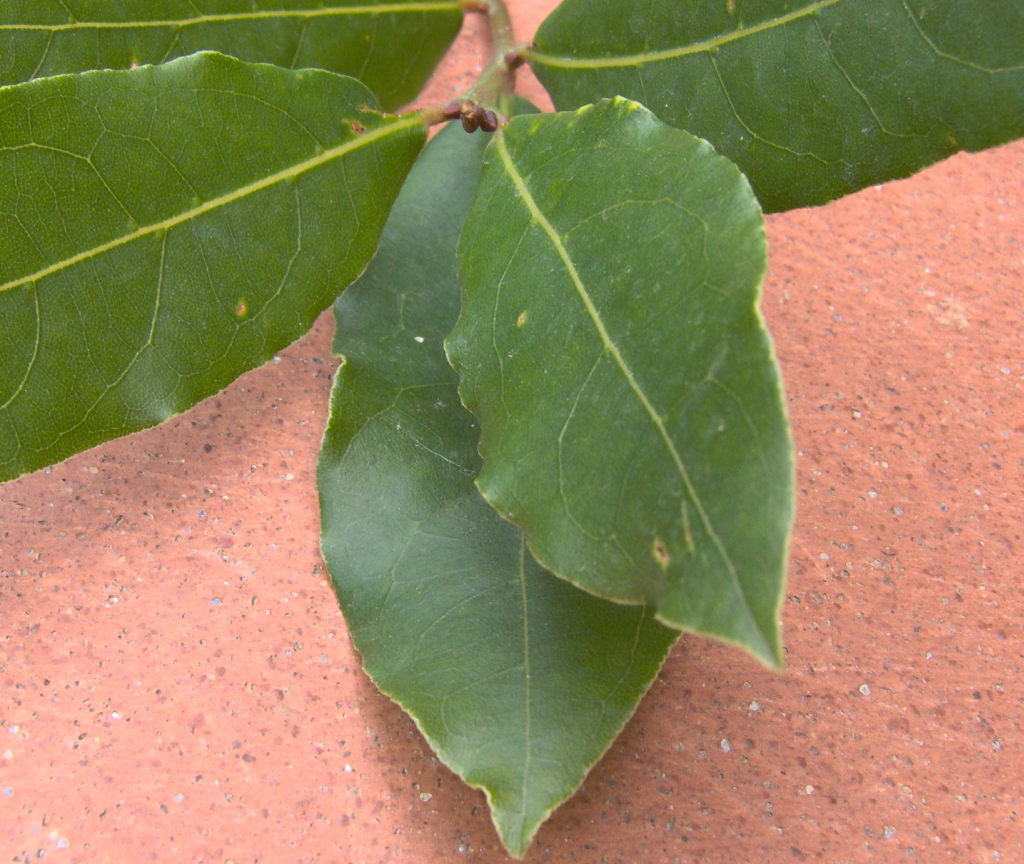
A few laurel leaves. Many of them were used as a cockade during the Rome uprisings of 1789.

The first sporadic demonstrations in favor of the ideals of the French Revolution by the Italian population took place in August 1789 with the organization of protests in various places on the Italian peninsula, especially in the Papal States. The rioters, in these early uprisings, had makeshift cockades made of green leaves pinned on their clothes in imitation of the similar protests that took place in France at the dawn of the revolution.

The use of cockades during the protests that took place in Italy was not an isolated case. It is documented that on 12 November 1789 the Prussian government forbade the Westphalian population to use cockades because they were viewed with suspicion given their meaning closely linked to the protest movements that were flaring up in France, and their use therefore went beyond the French borders and spread gradually across Europe. This also happened due to gazettes, printed in various European countries, that gave ample prominence to the fact that the cockade had become, in France, one of the most important symbols of the insurrectional uprisings and of the people's struggle against the absolutist regime that ruled at the time.

As for the Italian uprisings, noteworthy were the revolts that took place in Fano and Velletri just before 16 August, in Rome between 16 and 28 August, and in Frascati just before 30 August, all of which took place in the Papal States. In Rome, in particular, cockades, which were formed from laurel leaves, were pinned on the hats. The rioters demanded the lowering of the price of basic necessities with the threat of unleashing riots comparable to the violent Parisian protests in case of refusal of the authorities to satisfy these requests.

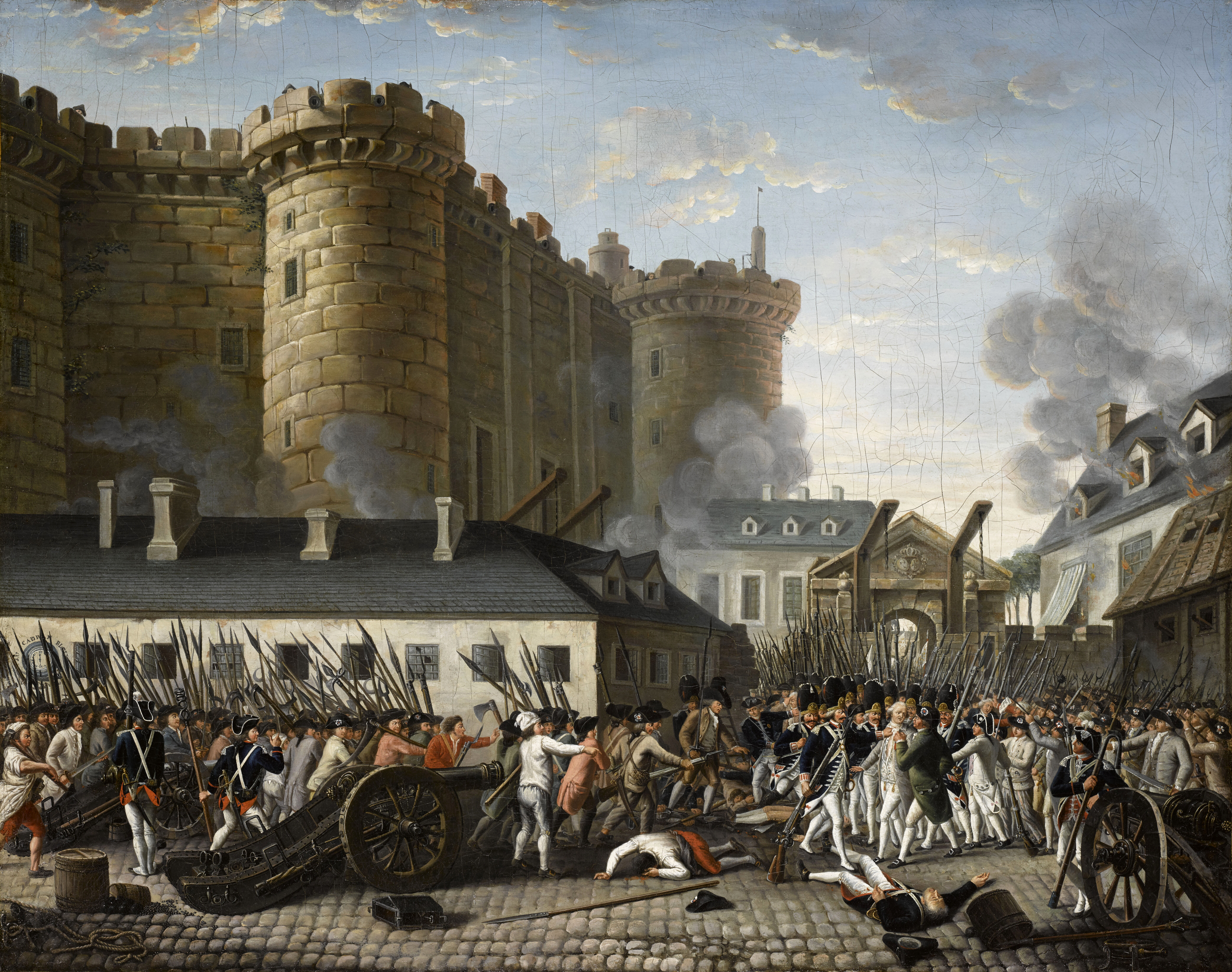
The people of Paris attack the fortress of the Bastille on 14 July 1789, decreeing the beginning of the French Revolution. Initially the Italian rioters mistakenly believed that the flag waved between the Parisian barricades was green, white and red.

The Milanese gazette Staffetta di Sciaffusa defined the protests in the Papal States as "[a] dance of green cockades" in an article published on 16 August 1789. From September 1789 there was no more news, in the Italian riots, of the cockade formed with the leaves which was replaced by cockades of green fabric.

==== The first Italian tricolour cockade ====
During the first weeks of the revolutionary season, it remained a common belief in Italy that the green, white and red flag was the flag waved by the French rioters. The Italian insurgents therefore used these colours as a simple imitation of the protests that were taking place in France and that were aimed at – in both nations – to the same objectives, namely to achieve better living conditions and to obtain civil and political rights, which have always been denied by absolutist regimes. The Italian gazettes of the time had in fact created confusion on the events of the French riots, in particular by omitting the replacement of green with blue and red and thus reporting the erroneous news that the French tricolour was green, white and red.

The error about the colours of the French cockade took root among the demonstrators because the newspapers did not correct the error immediately although at the time, in Italy, about 80 newspapers were printed, five of which in Milan alone. The news published were, at the beginning, also contradictory. For example, the Milanese gazette La Staffetta di Sciaffusa reported the news that the green French cockade made up of leaves had been replaced, the next day, by a red and white cockade (instead of blue and red).

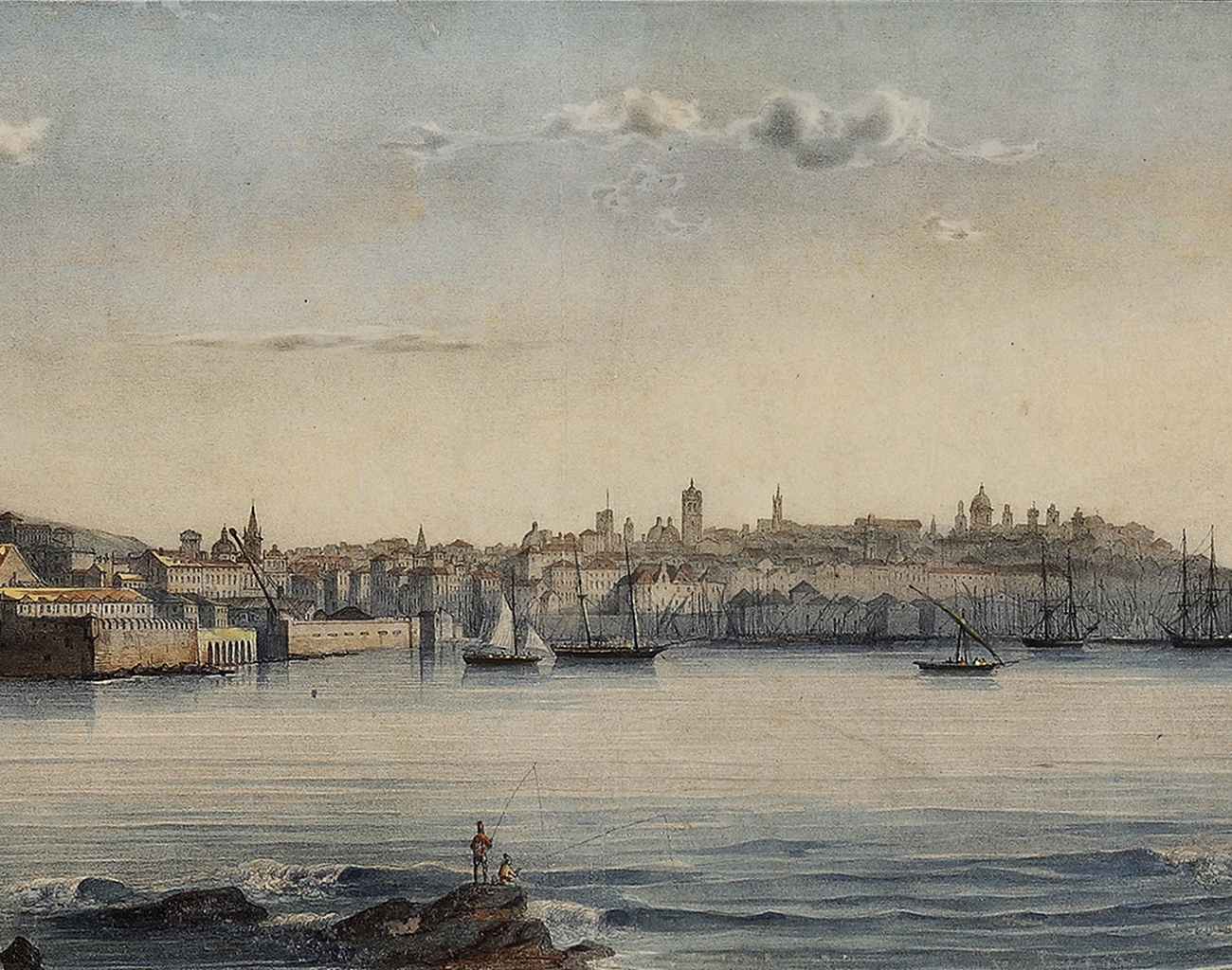
Panorama of Genoa in the early 19th century. Here, the Italian tricolour cockade appeared for the first time, and with it the Italian national colours.

Even on the subsequent and definitive French blue, white and red cockade, which was made on July 17, the newspapers made confusion reporting, as in the case of Il Corriere di Gabinetto, that it was only red and blue or, according to other newspapers, such as La Gazzetta Enciclopedica di Milano, which was white and pink. More precise information, subsequently reported by all the Italian newspapers, correctly informed that there are three colours of the French cockade, however their shades erroneously cited as green, white and red cockades.

The first documented trace of the use of the green, white and red cockade, which however does not specify the arrangement of the colours on the ornament, is dated 21 August 1789. In the historical archives of the Republic of Genoa it is reported that eyewitnesses had seen some demonstrators wandering around the city with "the new French white, red and green cockade introduced recently in Paris". The use of the term "new cockade" is indicative of the French makeshift cockades made of leaves to those in two and subsequently three colours, despite ignoring the real chromatic composition.

The Italian tricolour cockade represented as a roundel

The use of the cockade was viewed with suspicion and aversion by the Genoese state authorities, since it recalled those social impulses that were beginning to spread in Europe; the popular ferments had in fact frequently rebellious and destabilizing connotations. The Italian flag was therefore born as a form of popular protest against the absolutist regimes that ruled the peninsula at the time and not as a patriotic manifestation of Italianness, given that it was still far from the birth of that national awareness that then led to the unification of Italy.

It is also not excluded that the green, white and red cockade, with the erroneous belief in the use of green instead of blue, an inaccuracy perhaps caused by the previous use of green leaves, was born before 21 August, and in a different city than Genoa. The revolutionary ferments of the French events probably arrived in Italy before that date, it being understood that we do not yet have documented traces of this possible first realization of the tricolour cockade. It is proven by written evidence that the first revolutionary uprisings, in Italy, took place in August in the Papal State, but the sources relating to these events do not mention tricolour cockades, but only ornaments composed with leaves.

Finally, when the correct information on the chromatic composition of the French cockade arrived in Italy, the Italian Jacobins decided to keep green instead of blue, because it represented nature, and therefore metaphorically also natural rights, that is equality and freedom, both principles dear to them. Although the green, white and red tricolour, when introduced, simply had an imitative value, it was taken as a symbol of the Italian homeland during the popular uprisings of the early 19th century.

=== The tricolour cockade becomes one of the national symbols of Italy ===
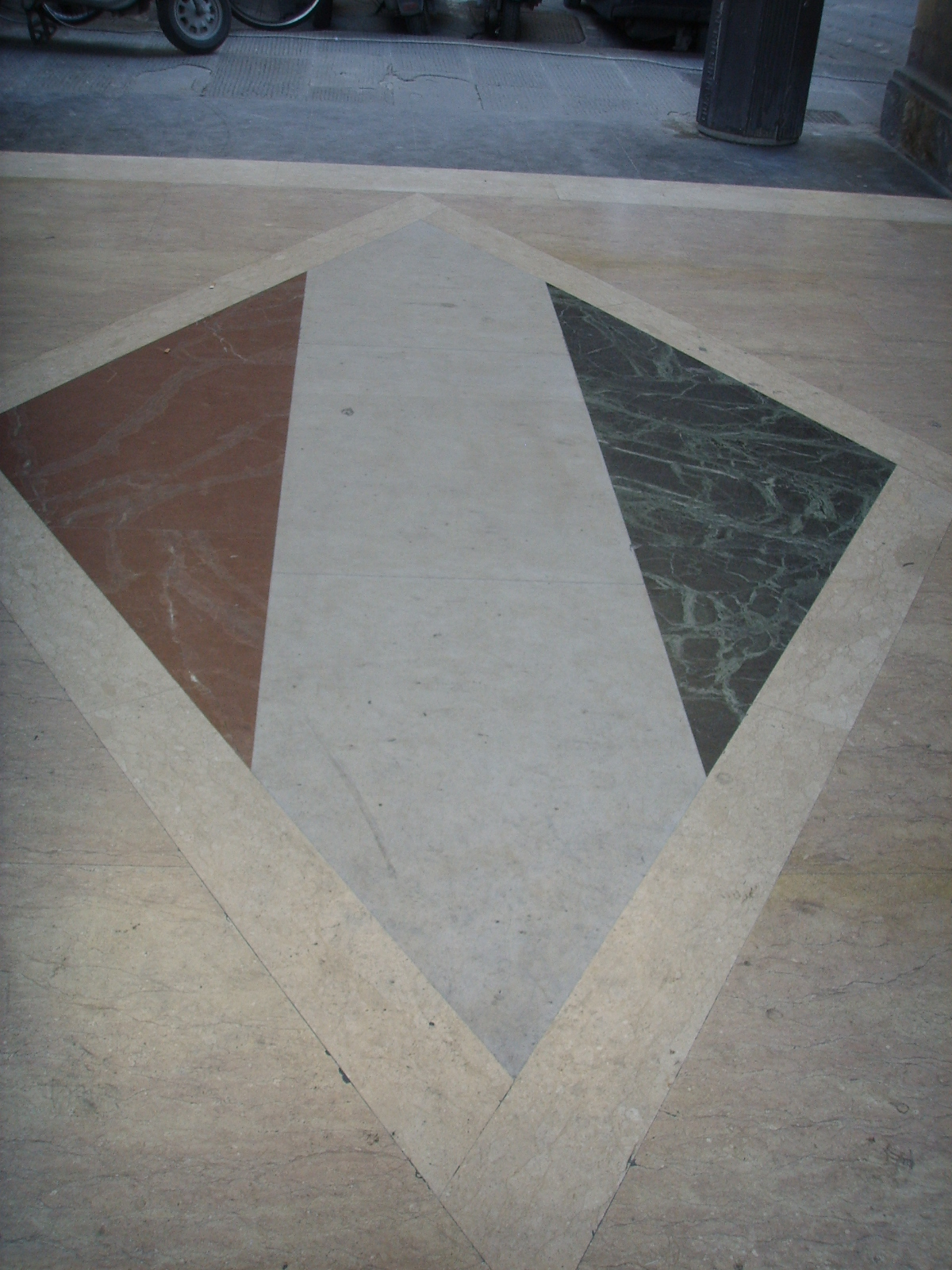
The three Italian national colours carved into the floor of the Post Office Building in Florence. After their appearance in Genoa on 21 August 1789, red, white and green gradually became part of the Italian collective imaginary until they were represented in the most varied areas.

The adoption in Italy of the green, white and red cockade was not immediate and univocal by the Italian patriots. Other appearances, still sporadic, of alternative cockades to the Genoese one after that of 1789 took place the following year, when they appeared in the red and white Grand Duchy of Tuscany, and in 1792 in Porto Maurizio, in the Republic of Genoa, red and white again. The first appearance of the Italian tricolour cockade abroad took place in 1791 in Toulon, France, brought by some Genoese sailors.

Later the green, white and red cockade always spread to a greater extent, gradually becoming the only ornament used in Italy by the rioters. The patriots began to call it "Italian cockade" making it become one of the symbols of the country. In fact, the error of gazette headlines on the colours of the French tricolour cockade was clarified, and consequently the connotations of uniqueness were assumed, green, white and red adopted by the Italian patriots as one of the most important symbols of the insurrectional and political struggle, aimed at completing the national unit taking the name of "Italian tricolour". The green, white and red tricolour thus acquired a strong patriotic value, becoming one of the symbols of national awareness, a change that gradually led it to enter the collective imaginary of the Italians.

The use of the Italian tricolour was not limited to the presence of green, white and red in a cockade, the latter, having been born on 21 August 1789, heralded by seven years the first tricolour war flag, which was chosen by the Lombard Legion on 11 October 1796, which is associated with the first official approval of the Italian national colours by the authorities. In this case Napoleon, and eight years later with the adoption of the flag of Italy, which was born on 7 January 1797, when it first assumed the role of the national flag of a sovereign Italian state, the Cispadane Republic.

The subsequent adoption by the Italian patriots of the green, white and red tricolour was immediate, unambiguous and devoid of political contrasts. In France the opposite happened since the French tricolour was taken as a symbol first by the Republicans, then by the Bonapartists that were in antagonism with the Monarchists and the Catholics, who had the royal white flag with the fleur-de-lis of France as their reference flag.

=== The cockade of the Bologna revolt ===
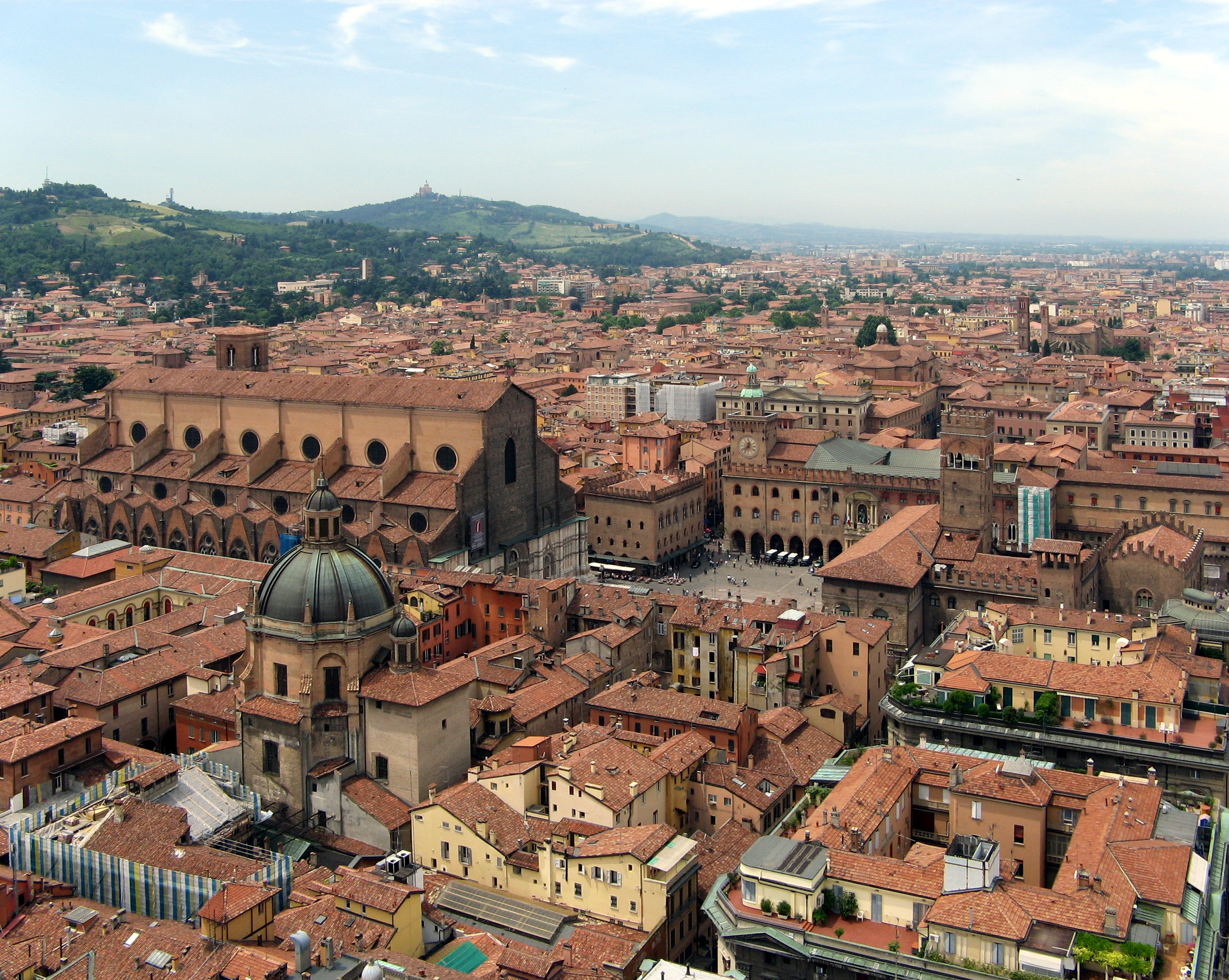
View of Bologna

From a historical perspective, given the judicial process and the clamor that followed, were the tricolour cockades made in 1794 by two students of the University of Bologna, Luigi Zamboni from Bologna and Giovanni Battista De Rolandis from Asti, who placed themselves at the head of an insurrectional attempt to free Bologna from papal rule. In addition to the two students, there were also two medical doctors, Antonio Succi and Angelo Sassoli, who then betrayed the patriots by referring everything to the papal police, and four other people (Giuseppe Rizzoli, known as Dozza, Camillo Tomesani, Antonio Forni Mago Sabino and Camillo Galli). Luigi Zamboni had previously expressed the desire to create a tricolour flag that would become the flag of a united Italy.

During this revolt attempt, which took place between 13 and 14 November 1794 (or, according to other sources, 13 December 1794), the demonstrators led by De Rolandis and Zamboni flaunted a red and white cockade (which are also the colours of the municipal coat of arms of Bologna) having a green lining. These cockades were made by Zamboni's parents. These cockades had green in the centre, white immediately outside and red on the edge.

During the recruitment work, De Rolandis and Zamboni managed to convince 30 people to participate in their attempt at insurrection. The two, to carry out the attempted revolt, purchased some firearms which later proved to be of poor quality. The goal was to spread a leaflet intended to give rise to Bologna and Castel Bolognese, proclaiming that there was no effect whatsoever.

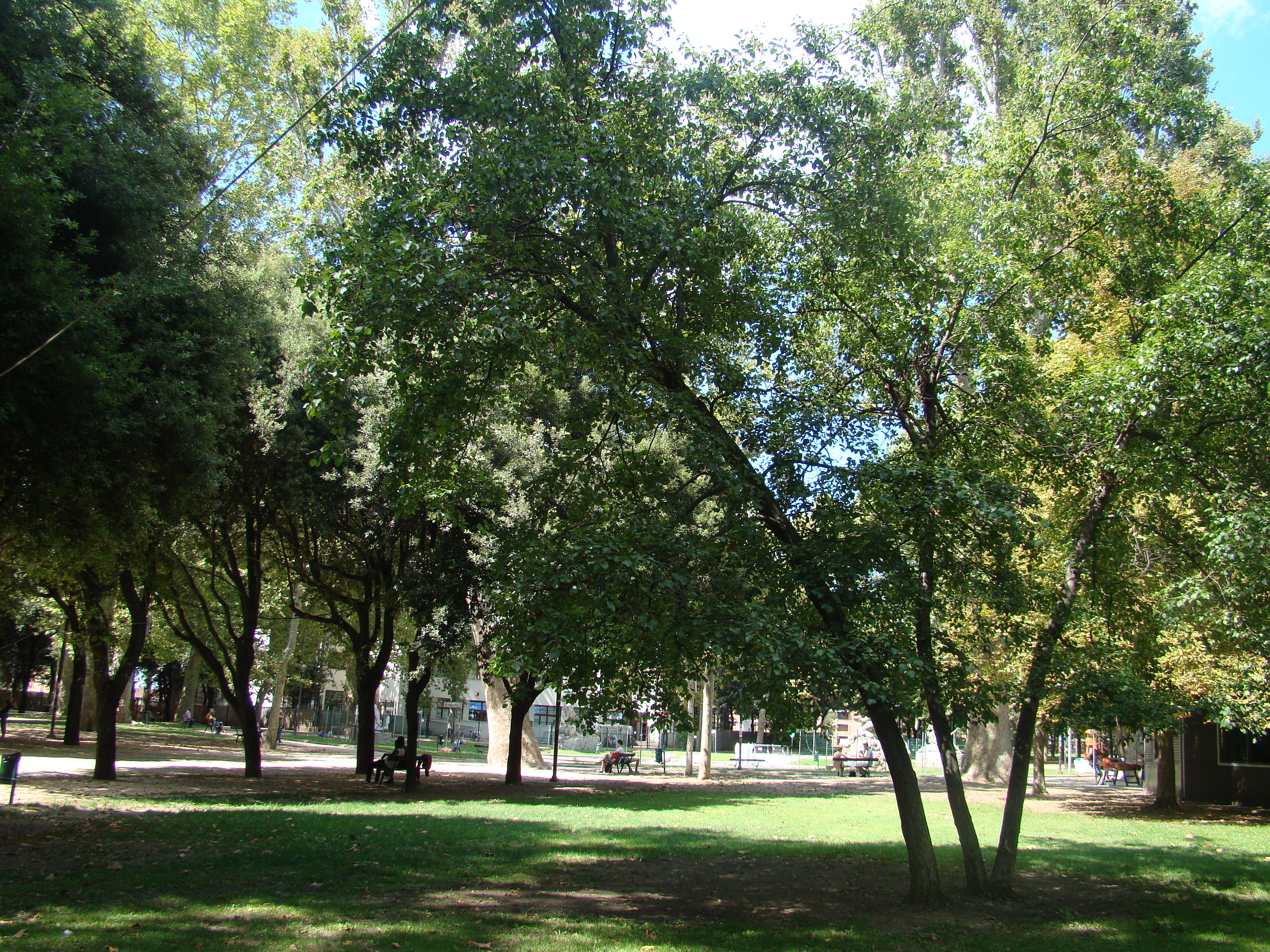
View of the Giardino della Montagnola in Bologna, where Zamboni and De Rolandis were buried. Their bodies were later dispersed.

After failing to raise the city, the revolutionaries tried to take refuge in the Grand Duchy of Tuscany, but the local police first captured them in Covigliaio and then handed them over to the papal authorities. After the capture of the fugitives, the latter launched an action "Super complocta et seditiosa compositione destributa per civitatem in conventicula armata" (a prosecution for fomenting armed treasonous conspiracy throughout the state) at the Tribunale del Torrone (the Inquisition of Bologna). The trial involved all the participants in the insurrectional attempt, the family of Zamboni and the Succi brothers.

Zamboni was found dead in a cell nicknamed "Inferno" ("Hell"), which he shared with two common criminals, probably killed by them on the orders of the police or perhaps suicide after an unsuccessful escape attempt on 18 August 1795.

De Rolandis was publicly executed, after being subjected to interrogation preceded and followed by ferocious torture, on 26 April 1796. Zamboni's father died almost 80 years after suffering terrible torture, while his mother was first whipped through the streets of Bologna and then sentenced to life imprisonment. The other defendants, where they had minor penalties, were freed shortly thereafter by the French, who in the meantime had invaded Emilia driving out the pontiffs. The bodies of De Rolandis and Zamboni were then solemnly buried in Bologna in the Giardino della Montagnola on the direct order of Napoleon, before being dispersed in 1799 with the arrival of the Austrians.

The historic cockade, which is owned by the De Rolandis family, has been exhibited for some time in the National Museum of the Italian Risorgimento in Turin. In 2006, during some renovations, it was transferred to the European Student Museum of the University of Bologna, where it is still preserved.

=== Free use during the Napoleonic era ===
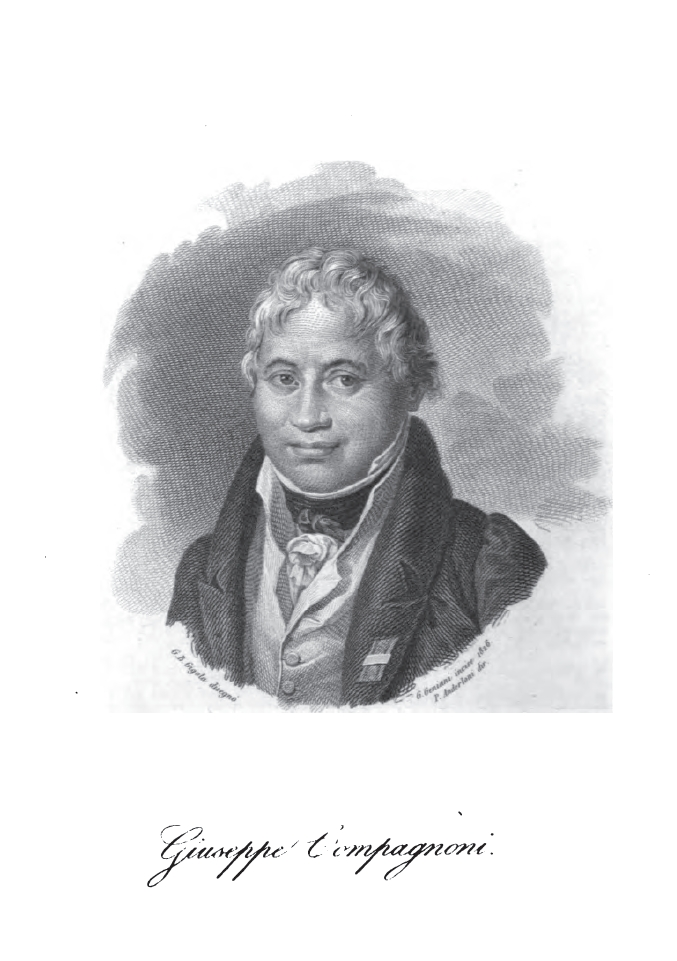
Giuseppe Compagnoni, known as the "father of the Italian flag". Compagnoni was the first to propose the adoption of a tricolour flag for a sovereign Italian state, the Cispadane Republic.

The tricolour cockade appeared, after the events of Bologna, during Napoleon's entry into Milan on 15 May 1796. These cockades, having the typical circular shape, possessed red on the outside, green on an intermediate position and white in the centre. These ornaments were worn by the rioters even during the religious ceremonies officiated inside the Milan Cathedral as thanks for the arrival of Napoleon, who was seen, at least initially, as a liberator. The tricolour cockades then became one of the official symbols of the Milanese National Guard, which was founded on 20 November 1796, and then spread elsewhere along the Italian Peninsula. The tricolour cockade was particularly linked to the Jacobin movement, which made it one of its most important symbols.

Precisely on the occasion of the first adoption of the green, white and red flag by a sovereign Italian state, the Cispadane Republic, which is dated 7 January 1797 and which was decreed by an assembly held in a hall of the town hall of Reggio Emilia, it was decided that the tricolour cockade, also considered one of the official symbols of the newborn Napoleonic state, should have been worn by all citizens. On that occasion, Giuseppe Compagnoni, who is celebrated as the "father of the Italian flag", proposed the adoption of the Italian flag and cockade.

[...] From the minutes of the XIV Session of the Cispadan Congress: Reggio Emilia, 7 January 1797, 11 am. Patriotic Hall. The participants are 100, deputies of the populations of Bologna, Ferrara, Modena and Reggio Emilia. Giuseppe Compagnoni also motioned that the standard or Cispadan Flag of three colours, Green, White and Red, should be rendered Universal and that these three colours should also be used in the Cispadan Cockade, which should be worn by everyone. It is decreed. [...]

— Decree of adoption of the tricolour flag by the Cispadane Republic

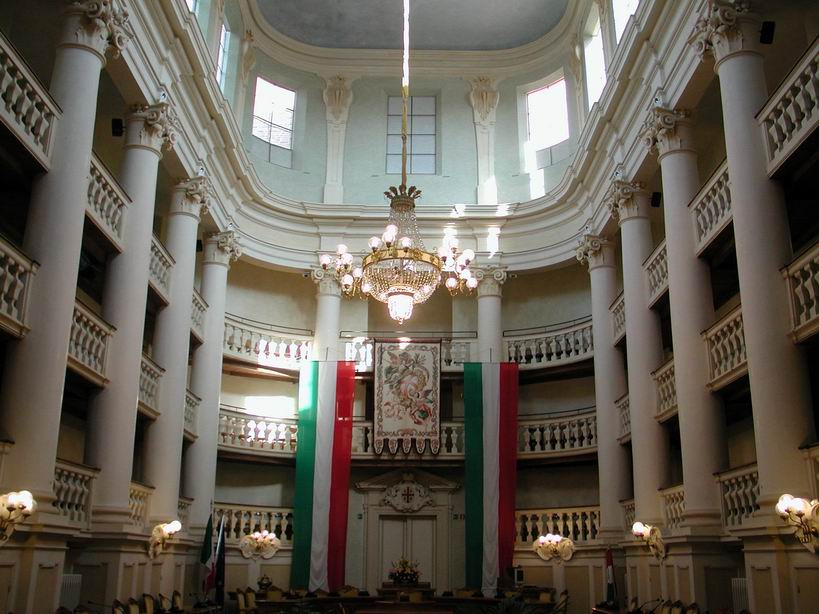
The 18th century Sala del Tricolore, which later became the council chamber of the town hall of Reggio Emilia, where the tricolour flag was officially adopted by the Cispadane Republic

In Bergamo, civilians were obliged to wear a tricolour cockade pinned to their clothes, a coercion that was sanctioned, on 13 May 1797, also in Modena and Reggio Emilia. Even without the need for obligations on the part of the authorities, the cockade spread more and more among the population, who wore it with pride, laying the foundations, together with other factors, for the Italian unification. By decree of 18 May 1797, the Provisional Municipality of Venice noted that "the nation had adopted...the tricolour cockade green, white, and red" and adopted it for its own use as well.

On 29 June 1797, with the merger of the Cispadane Republic and the Transpadane Republic, the Cisalpine Republic was born, a pro-French state body that extended over Lombardy, on part of Emilia and Romagna and which had Milan as its capital. The event, which took place at the lazaretto of Milan, was characterized by a riot of flags and tricolour cockades.

=== Its use during the Italian unification ===
==== The first riots ====
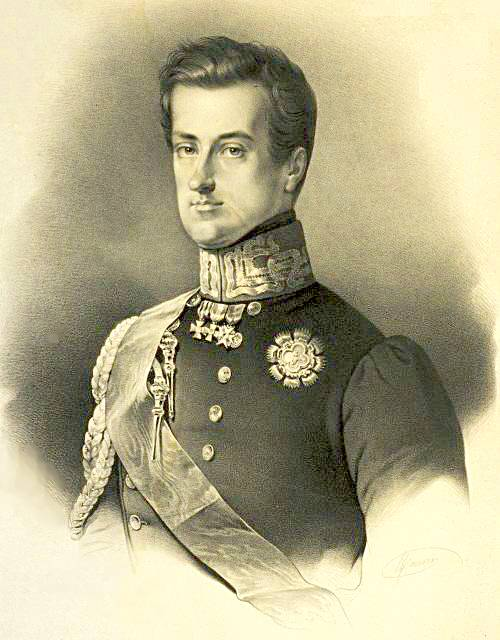
Charles Albert of Piedmont-Sardinia

With the fall of Napoleon and the restoration of the absolutist monarchical regimes, the national colours of Italy, and with it the tricolour cockade, went underground, becoming the symbol of the patriotic ferments that began to spread in Italy and the symbol which united all the efforts of the Italian people towards freedom and independence. The social ferments that led to the birth of Italian patriotism originated in the Napoleonic era, during which the ideals of the French Revolution spread, including the concept of self-determination of the people.

Although the pre-Napoleonic regimes had been restored, liberal ideas often resulted in the will of the people to free themselves from foreign domination by constituting a unitary and independent state body. As in the Italian case, while the demand for greater civil and political rights on the part of the population did not stop with the reconstitution of the absolutist states, the uprisings that would have characterized the 19th century resurfaced.

The use of the tricolour cockade was forbidden by the Austrians in the Kingdom of Lombardy–Venetia together with the use of the green, white and red flag under death penalty. The purpose of this provision, quoting the textual words of Emperor Franz Joseph I of Austria, was to "make people forget that they are Italian". The tricolour cockade appeared, for the first time after the Napoleonic era, during the uprisings of 1820–21 in the Kingdom of the Two Sicilies pinned on the hats or clothes of Italian patriots; its reappearance was therefore still sporadic and limited to a specific territory. The tricolour cockade appeared again during the revolts of 1830–31, pinned on the clothing of Italian patriots, which took place mainly in the Papal States, in the Duchy of Modena and Reggio and in the Duchy of Parma and Piacenza, in which there was a profusion of handkerchiefs and of tricolour cockades. Also in this case, its appearance was limited to some states of the Italian peninsula.

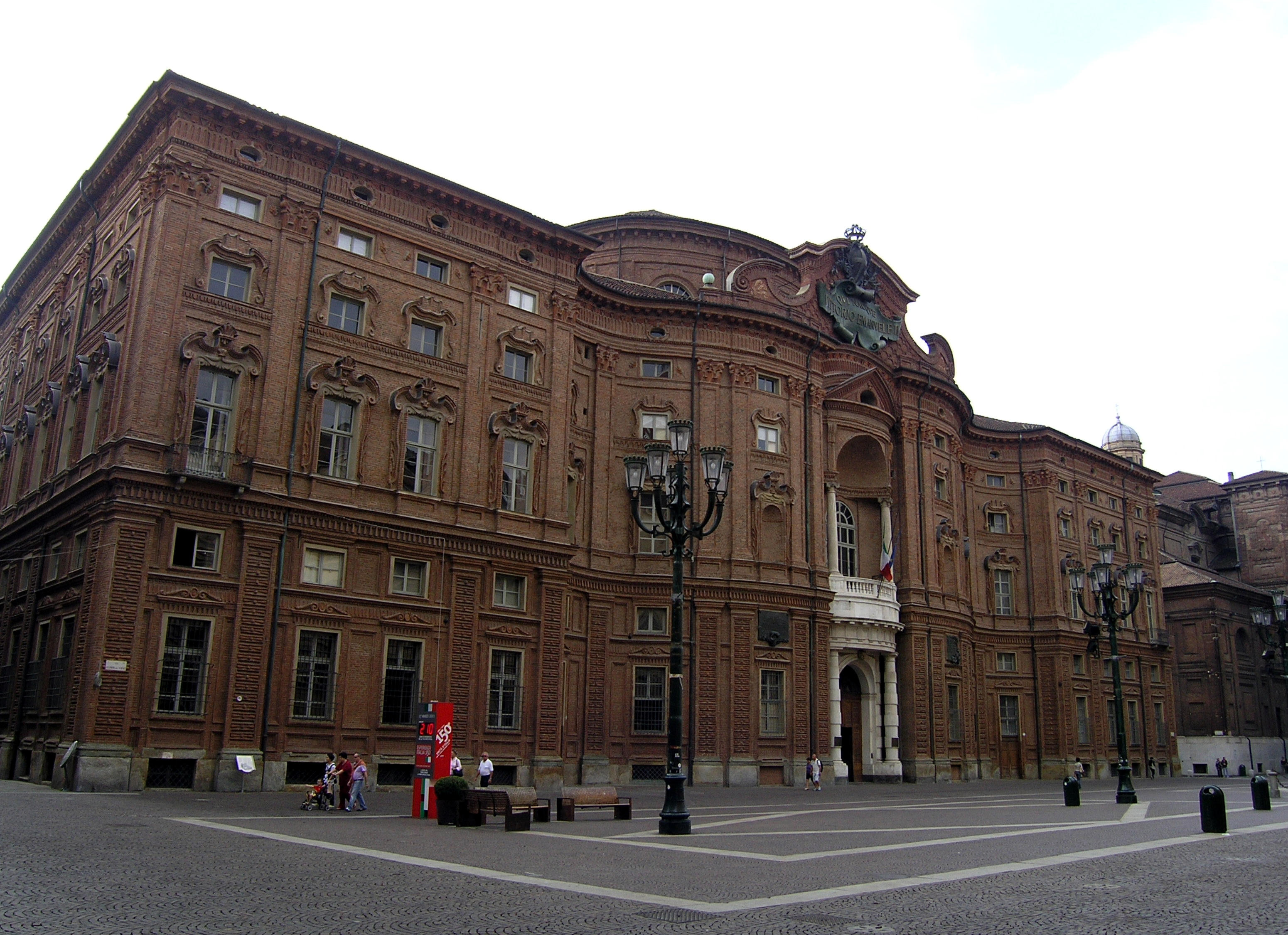
Facade of the National Museum of the Italian Risorgimento in Turin which is the oldest and most important museum dedicated to the Italian unification due to the richness and representativeness of its collections and the only one that officially has the title of "national"

In this context, in 1820, on the occasion of the solemn celebrations linked to the granting of the constitution by Ferdinand I of the Two Sicilies, the members of the royal family wore tricolour cockades. The uprisings of 1820–21 had in fact the greatest consequences in the Kingdom of Piedmont-Sardinia, where the uprisings were led for a short period by Charles Albert of Piedmont-Sardinia, who had not yet become king, and in the Kingdom of the Two Sicilies. The latter, in particular, the Sicilian Parliament, was also reopened and the Neapolitan Parliament was convened for the first time.

If the riots of the 14th and 15th centuries were driven by humanism, with all the effects of chance, including the link with classicism, the patriotic revolts of the 19th century, with their ideas of independence and freedom, and iconic symbols, among which there were the cockades, were instead inspired by Romanticism.

==== The revolutions of 1848 ====
Tricolour cockades continued to be the protagonists, pinned on the chest or on the hats of patriots, in the popular uprisings that followed such as the case of the Five Days of Milan (18–22 March 1848), during which they had a wide diffusion among the insurgents, many of whom were religious. The Milanese clergy actively supported the patriotic demands of their faithful.

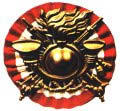
The parade frieze of the Bersaglieri, which is based on a tricolour cockade

In this context, on 23 March 1848, the king of Piedmont-Sardinia Charles Albert of Piedmont-Sardinia issued a proclamation with decisive political connotations with which the Sardinian sovereign assured the provisional government of Milan formed following the five days that his troops, ready to come to his aid, would have used the Italian tricolour as a war flag:

"In order to show more clearly with exterior signs the commitment to Italian unification, We want that Our troops ... have the Savoy shield placed on the Italian tricolour flag.

— Charles Albert of Piedmont-Sardinia

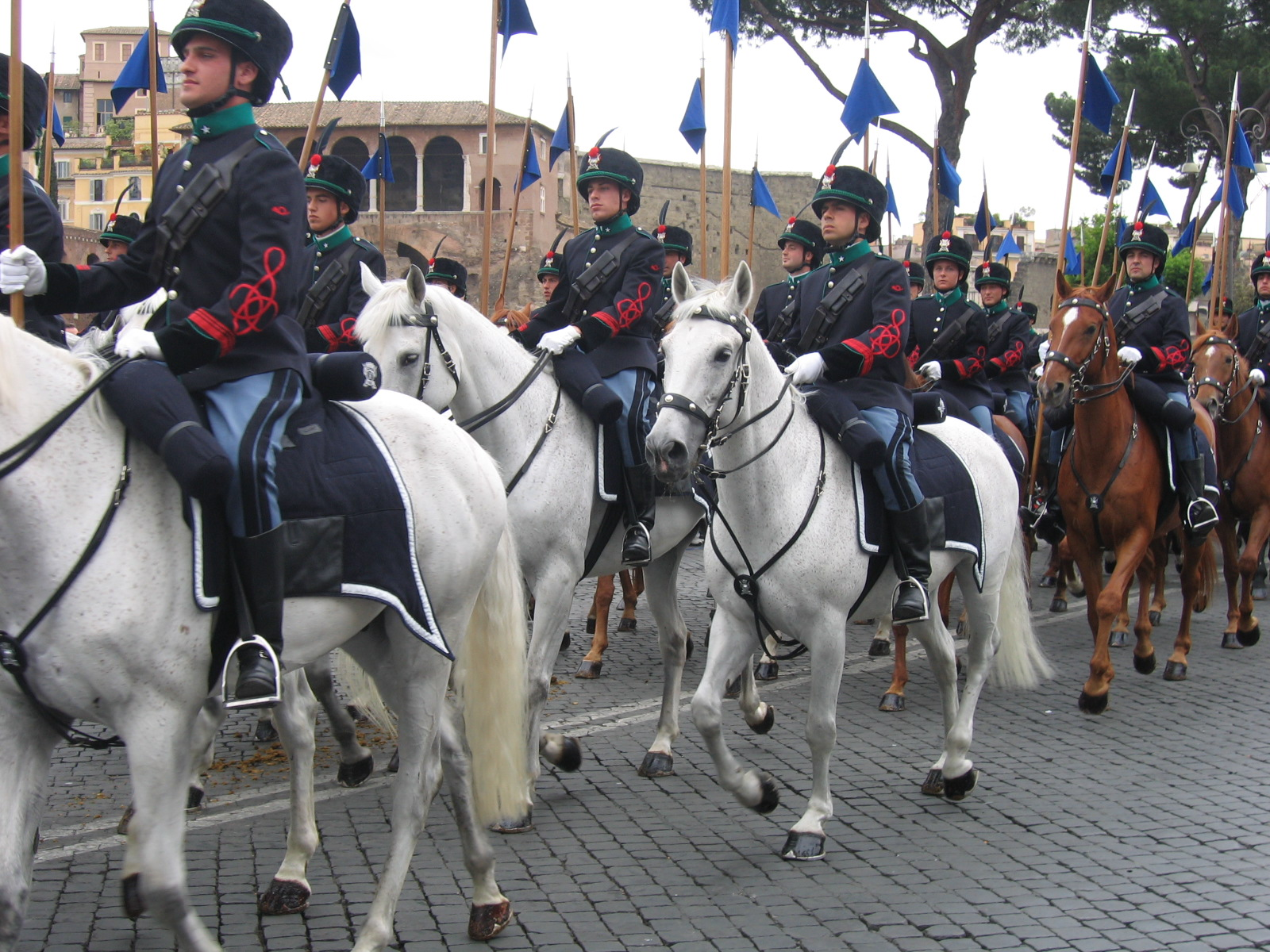
Cavalry regiment "Lancieri di Montebello" at the military parade of the Festa della Repubblica on 2 June 2006. On their hat, under the coat of arms, is the Italian tricolour cockade.

The Milanese then welcomed Charles Albert of Piedmont-Sardinia and his troops with a profusion of flags and tricolour cockades. On 14 June 1848, a circulaire from the Ministry of War of the Kingdom of Piedmont-Sardinia, decreed the replacement of the Savoy blue cockade, in all military areas in which it was used, with the tricolour cockade:

[...] With the ministerial circulaire of 14 June 1848 it was made known to the Governors and the Viceroy of Piedmont-Sardinia to have S.M. ordered that the Italian National Tricolour Flag with the Savoy Cross on it be replaced with the one existing in the Forts and other places where it is usually raised; that this Flag was also distributed to all Corps of the Royal Army, and limited in the future to only one for each Regiment; and that both the officers, and all the troops, had likewise to replace the blue with the cockade for the three Italian national colours; the use of which, according to the declarations of the ministerial dispatch of 13 July following, should undoubtedly be extended to all the R. Employees who wore a uniform. [...].

— Ministerial Circular of June 14, 1848 of the Kingdom of Piedmont-Sardinia

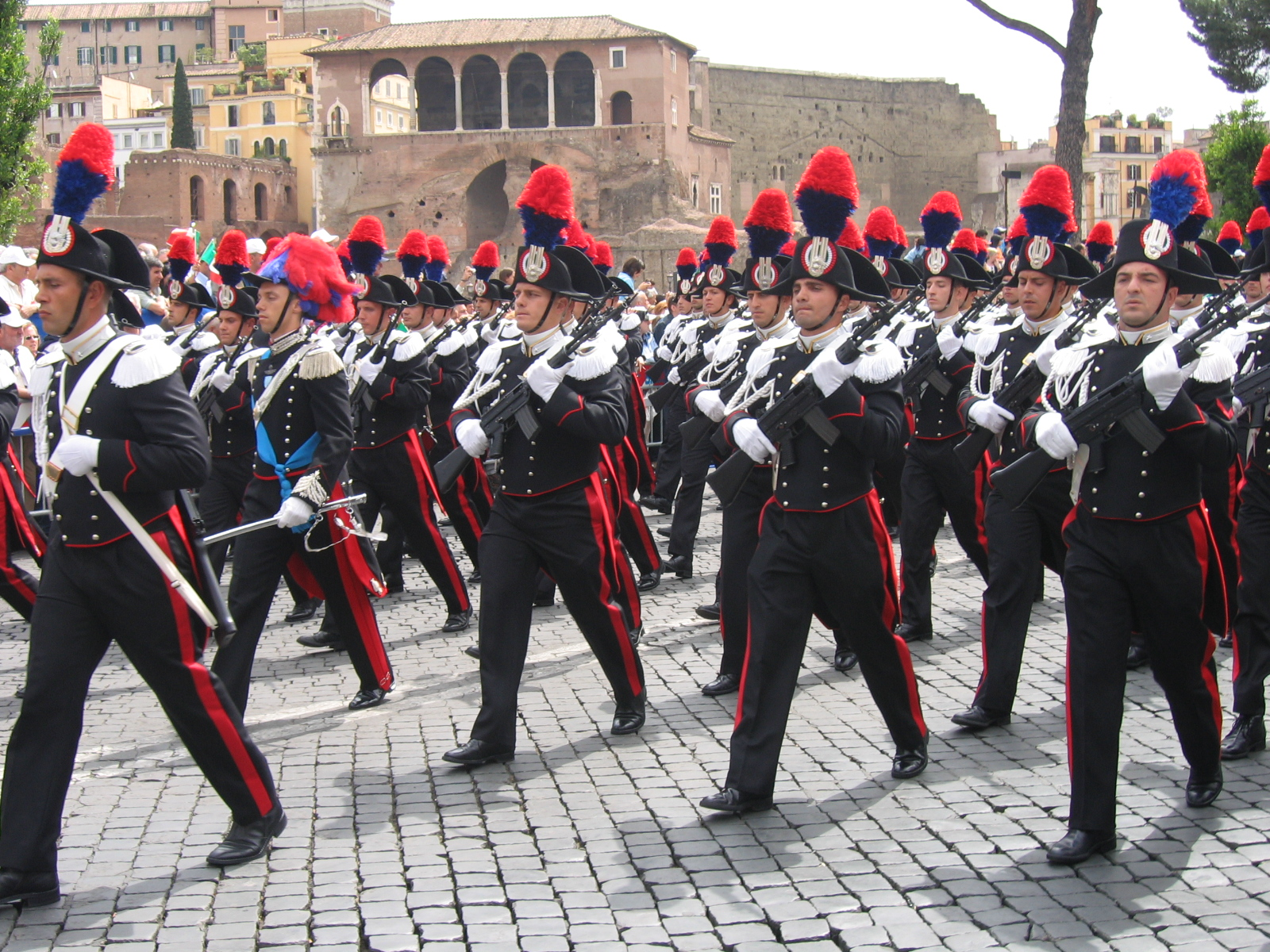
Carabinieri in full uniform at the military parade of the Festa della Repubblica of 2 June 2006. On their hat, under the coat of arms, is the Italian tricolour cockade.

The blue cockade was until then placed on the hat of the uniform of the Carabinieri, on the frieze of the Bersaglieri caps and on the headgear of the cavalry regiments. On the hat of the Carabinieri the blue cockade was present since the foundation of the military branch, which is dated 1814, for the cavalry its introduction is ascribable to 1843 while for the Bersaglieri to 1836.

Specifically, the excerpt from the circulaire dated 14 June 1848 stated that the blue cockade would be replaced:

[…] [With] the cockade with the three Italian national colours conforming to the established models. [...].

— Ministerial Circulaire of June 14, 1848 of the Kingdom of Piedmont-Sardinia

In the institutional context, the blue cockade had a different fate. The Statuto Albertino of the Kingdom of Piedmont-Sardinia, which was promulgated on 4 March 1848 by Charles Albert of Piedmont-Sardinia, hence the name, and which later became the fundamental law of the Kingdom of Italy, provided in article 77 that the blue cockade was the national one alone. This article remained in force until 1 January 1948 when the Albertine Statute was replaced by the Constitution of the Italian Republic, which sanctioned the use of the tricolour cockade in all official seats of the Republic.

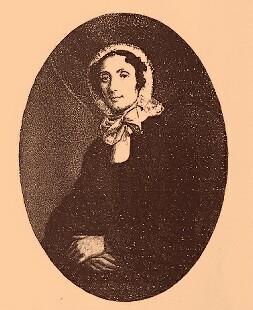
Laura Solera Mantegazza

During the revolutions of 1848 of the tricolour cockades, it appeared in all Italian pre-unification states, from the Kingdom of Piedmont-Sardinia pinned on the hats or clothes of Italian patriots, to the Kingdom of Lombardy–Venetia, from the Kingdom of the Two Sicilies, to the Papal States, from the Grand Duchy of Tuscany, to the Duchy of Parma and Piacenza and to that of Modena and Reggio. The tricolour cockade was among the symbols most frowned upon by the authorities, for example, Charles II, Duke of Parma, although he was not among the most reactionary sovereigns (so much so that he granted relative freedom of the press), he forbade its use in his duchy.

In the official context, the cockade became one of the official symbols of the Kingdom of Sicily, a state which became independent from the Bourbon kingdom during the Sicilian revolution of 1848.

==== The unification of Italian peninsula ====
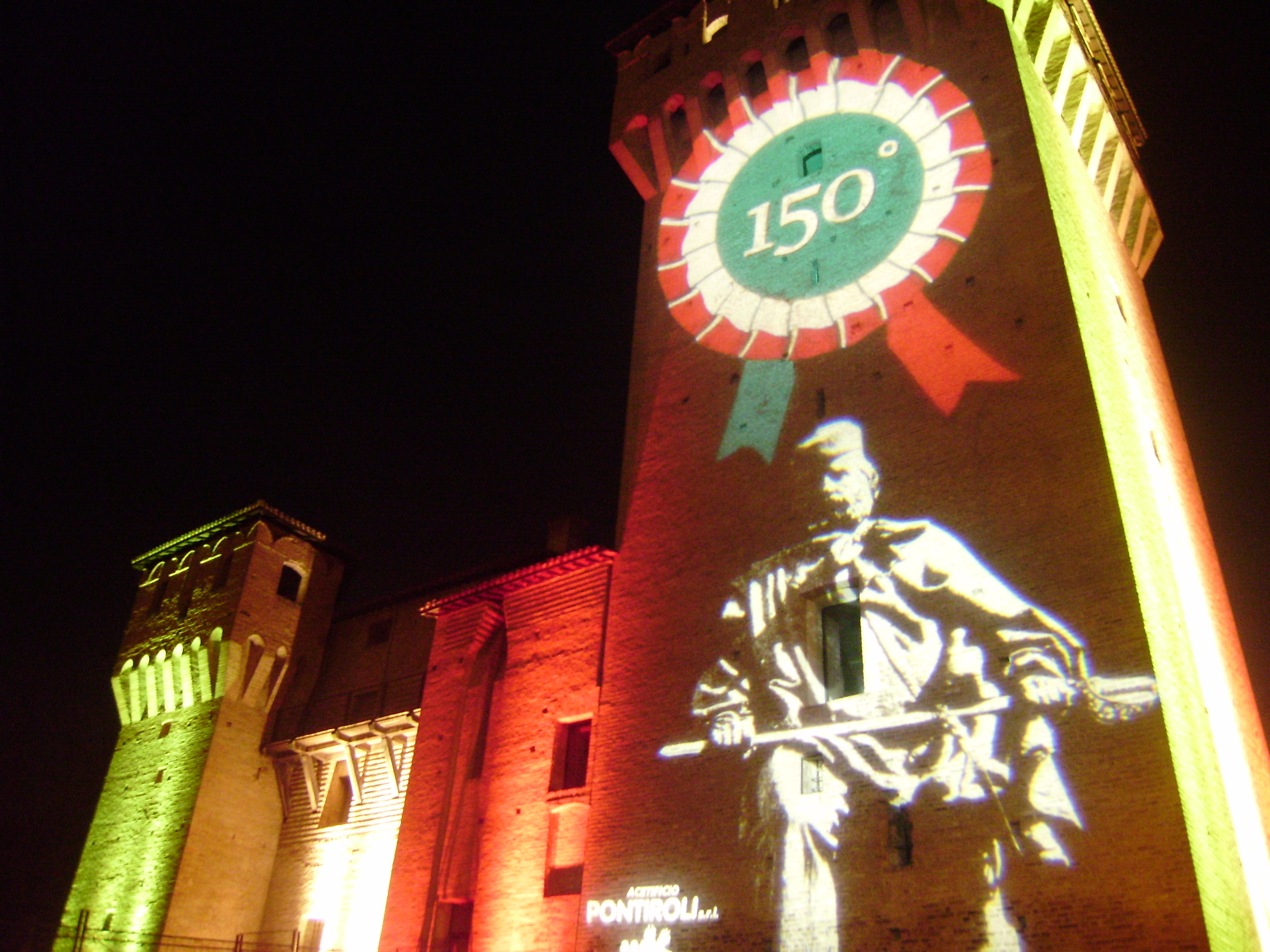
Tricolour cockade projected on the Rocca Estense, San Felice sul Panaro on the occasion of the 150th anniversary of the unification of Italy (2011)

During the Second Italian War of Independence the territories that were gradually conquered by Victor Emmanuel II of Piedmont-Sardinia and Napoleon III of France acclaimed the two sovereigns as liberators waving green, white and red flags and wearing tricolour cockades. The regions ready to ask for annexation to the Kingdom of Piedmont-Sardinia through the plebiscites of the unification of Italy also expressed their desire to be part of a united Italy with the waving of flags and the use of cockades on their clothes.

The tricolour cockades were also present during the Expedition of the Thousand (1860), starting to appear on the jackets of the Sicilians who gradually swelled the ranks of the Garibaldians. In particular, they made their debut shortly before Giuseppe Garibaldi's conquest of Palermo, and then followed the hero of the two worlds in his victorious campaign in the Kingdom of the Two Sicilies.

Tricolour cockades were given to the inhabitants of the Kingdom of the Two Sicilies, just before each movement of insurrection, so that they would have a distinctive sign with an unequivocal meaning. They were also pinned on the cap of the official uniform of the body of public order established by Giuseppe Garibaldi in the lands that were progressively conquered.

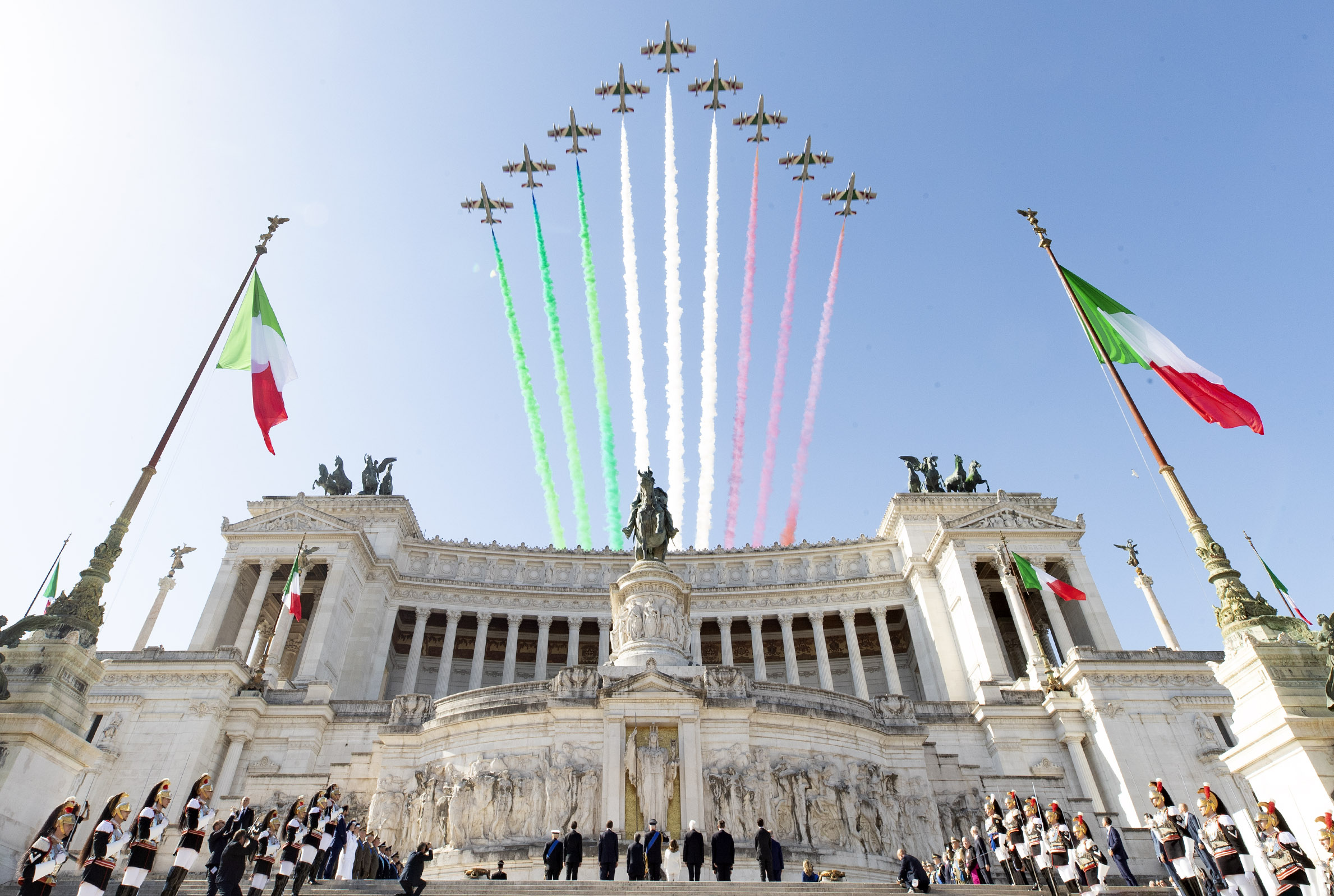
The Frecce Tricolori, with the smoke trail representing the national colours of Italy, above the Victor Emmanuel II Monument in Rome during the celebrations of the Festa della Repubblica. They represent the best known scenographic use of the three Italian national colours.

Tricolour cockades were made by some Milanese patriots, led by Laura Solera Mantegazza, to finance the Expedition of the Thousand. Each tricolour cockade, which was sold for one lira, was associated with a numbered ticket bearing on the front the effigy of Giuseppe Garibaldi, the Italian tricolour and the words "Soccorso a Garibaldi", while on the back the words "Soccorso alla Sicilia". 24,442 cockades were sold, a result below expectations perhaps due to an unfounded rumor spread among the supporting population that part of the profit obtained from the sale of the cockades would go to Giuseppe Mazzini, a patriot disliked by some of the Milanese.

The use of tricolour cockades continued even after the Italian unification conquests ended. In the territories then subject to plebiscites, even after the popular consultation, the use of green, white and red ornaments pinned on clothes and caps was very common. On 17 March 1861, there was the proclamation of the Kingdom of Italy, the formal act that sanctioned, with a normative act of the Kingdom of Piedmont-Sardinia, the birth of the unified Kingdom of Italy.

=== Subsequent uses ===
==== Aeronautical and military field ====
After the Italian unification, the tricolour cockade continued to be used in the military field on the parade headdresses of the aforementioned departments of the Italian armed forces and was also introduced in the aeronautical field.

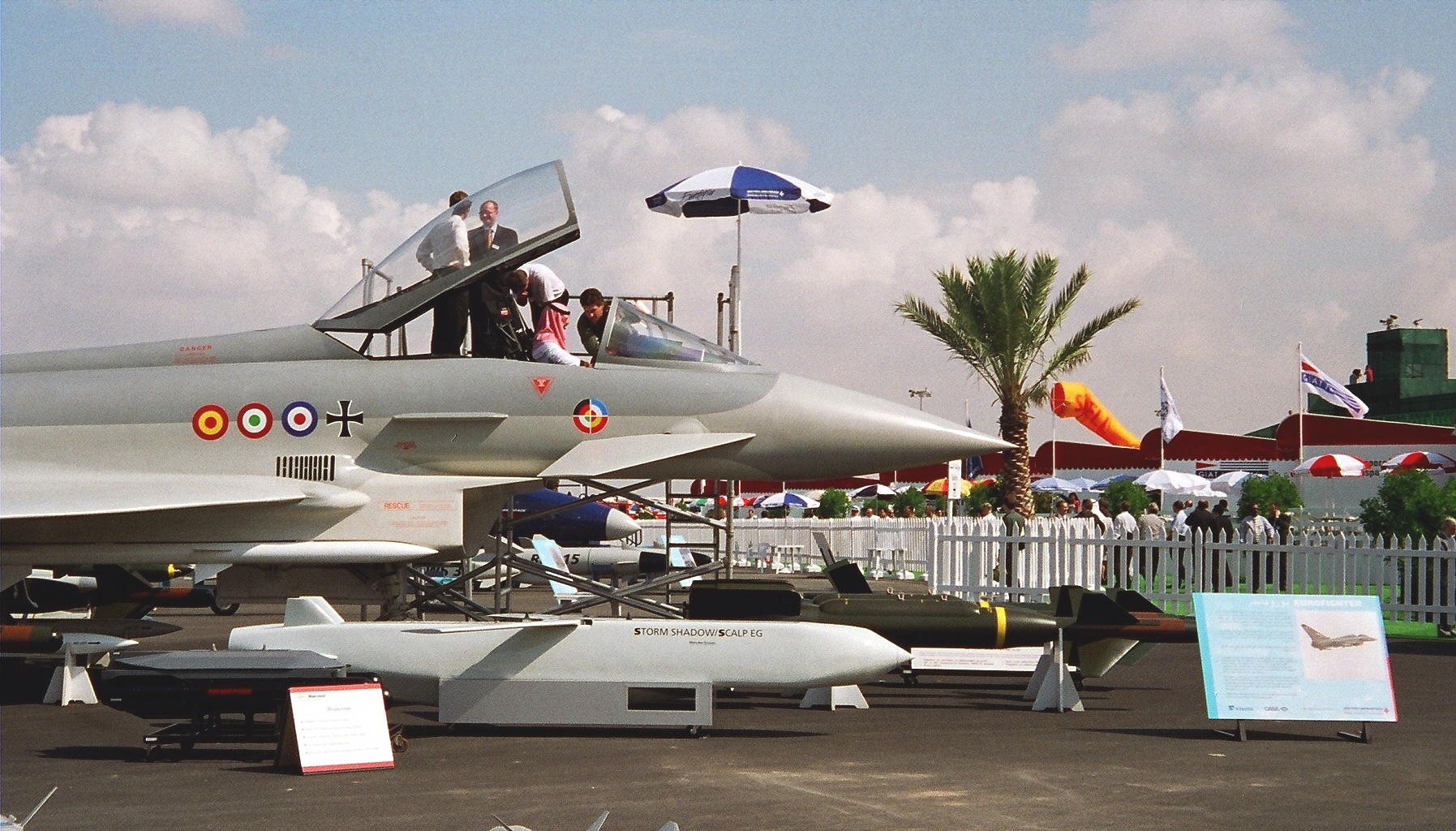
Cockades applied to the fuselage of a Eurofighter Typhoon on display at the air show in Dubai, United Arab Emirates, in a photo from 1998. The cockades represent, from the left, the Ejército del Aire (Spain), the Italian Air Force (Italy), the Royal Air Force (United Kingdom) and the Luftwaffe (Germany).

After the entry of the Kingdom of Italy in the First World War, the Italian Supreme Military Command realized the inadequacy of the markings previously used on Italian aircraft, therefore it ordered to paint the vertical empennage with the tricolour and the intrados of the wings with green, white and red sections for the recognition of nationality. Much more often, however, the central section was not painted white, remaining the colour of the canvas. As a further mark, the tricolour cockade, in the roundel version with the external red, the central white and the internal green, was established on 21 December 1917, being placed on the sides of the fuselage and above the upper wing.

The following period, tricolour cockades appeared that had a green perimeter and a red central disc with a position of the colours that was inverted compared to that conventionally used. Following complaints from the Allies, aimed at avoiding confusion between cockades used on the planes of the British Royal Flying Corps and with the aircraft of the French Aéronautique Militaire, which operated in the same theater of war.

Often the aircraft purchased from France kept however, for practicality, some rosettes with the red on the outside, simply superimposing the green on the central blue, therefore the reverse of the nationally produced airplanes. The Italian tricolour cockade was used discontinuously until 1927, when it was replaced by a cockade depicting the fasces, one of the most identifying symbols of fascism.

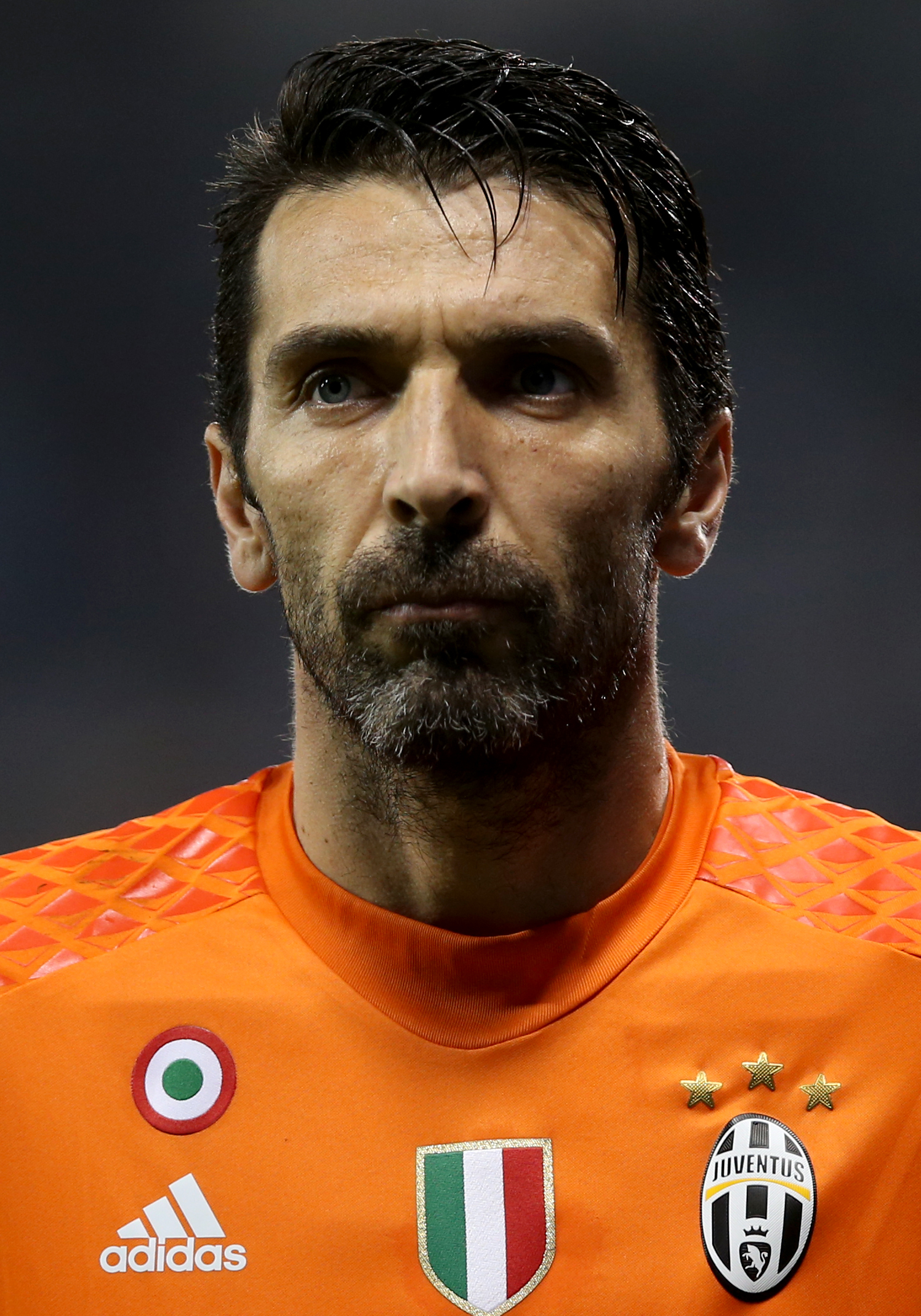
Gianluigi Buffon in 2016, wearing the tricolour cockade (top left badge) representing the victory of Juventus FC in the Coppa Italia in the previous season. Also present in the image is the Scudetto, worn by the current holders of the Serie A title.

In the aeronautical field, the tricolour cockade with red outwards and green in the centre returned to use, without being changed, in 1943, during the Second World War, on the occasion of the establishment of the Italian Co-belligerent Air Force. After the fall of fascism, there was the immediate disappearance of all the symbols linked to it, including the fasces.

The tricolour cockade, which was then widely used on all Italian state aircraft, not only military, is still today one of the symbols of the Italian Air Force. In 1991, the low visibility tricolour cockade was introduced, which is characterized by a narrower white band than the other two.

Also in the military field, the tricolour cockade has been the basis of the parade frieze of the Bersaglieri, cavalry regiments, Carabinieri (when it replaced the Italian blue cockade in this role), and of the Guardia di Finanza since 14 June 1848. The latter was founded in 1862, therefore after the change of the cockade in 1848, the Guardia di Finanza has always had, as the basis of its frieze, the tricolour cockade.

==== Institutional context ====
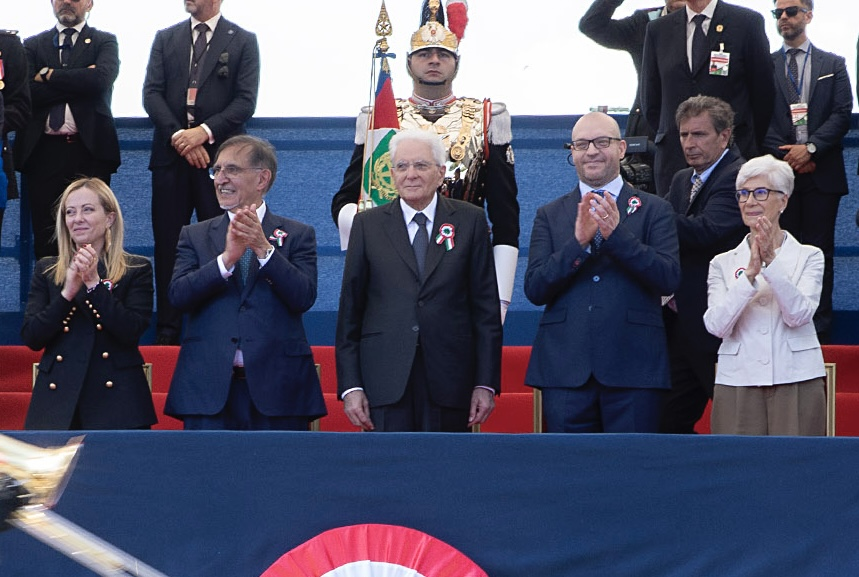
The most important offices of the Italian State have pinned on the jacket, during the military parade of the Festa della Repubblica celebrated every 2 June, a tricolour cockade.

It is tradition for the most important offices of the Italian State to have pinned on the jacket, during the military parade of the Festa della Repubblica celebrated every 2 June, a tricolour cockade.

==== Sport ====
In Italian sport, the tricolour cockade became the distinctive symbol of the successes in national cups starting in the 1950s; the cockade is sewn on the jersey of the team holding the trophy for the following season.

The Italian tricolour cockade made its debut in football in the 1958–59 season on Lazio jerseys. In football, starting from the 1985–86 season, the cockade used for the teams holding the Coppa Italia underwent a change. The version with the inverted colours began to be used, that is with the green outside and the red in the centre. From the 2006–07 season the conventional typology was restored, the one with red on the outside and green in the centre. In football, the cockade is also a symbol, again in the roundel shape, of the victories in the Coppa Italia Serie D, in the Coppa Italia Dilettanti and — with green on the outside and red on the inside — in the Coppa Italia Serie C.

== The cockade of Italy in music ==
A famous song written by Francesco Dall'Ongaro and set to music by Luigi Gordigiani was dedicated to the tricolour cockade:

And my love went to Siena,
bring me the cockade of three colours:
the white is the faith that chains us,
red is the joy of our hearts.
I will put a verbena leaf in it
which I myself fed with fresh moods.
And I'll tell him the green, the red and the white
they fit him well with a sword at his side,
and I will tell him that the white, the red and the green
it is a trio that is played and not lost
and I will tell him that the green, the white and the red
you mean that Italy has shaken its yoke,
Finally I will tell him that the tricolour
emblem is of faith, of peace and love

— The tricolour cockade, by Francesco Dall'Ongaro and Luigi Gordigiani

== Italian azure cockade ==
The Italian azure cockade

1818 depiction of a Carabiniere with the Italian azure cockade on his hat

The Italian azure cockade was one of the representative ornaments of Italy, obtained by circularly pleating an azure ribbon. Coming from the Savoy blue, the colour of the Italian royal family from 1861 to 1946, the azure cockade remained officially in use until 1 January 1948, when the constitution of the Italian Republic came into force, after which it was replaced, in all official offices, from the Italian tricolour cockade.

The azure cockade originates from at least in the 17th century, as evidenced by some documents which confirm its presence on military uniforms in use at the time of Victor Amadeus II of Sardinia. Other sources testify to its use even in the 18th century.

The Albertine Statute of the Kingdom of Piedmont-Sardinia, which was promulgated on 4 March 1848, and which later became the fundamental law of the Kingdom of Italy, foresaw that the azure cockade was the only national one. In this way the azure, historical colour of the Kingdom of Piedmont-Sardinia and even before the Duchy of Savoy, was kept alongside the tricolour cockade born in 1789, and which was instead very common among the population.

On 14 June 1848, during the First Italian War of Independence, a circulaire from the Ministry of War decreed the replacement of the azure cockade, which until then had been placed on the hat of the uniform of the Carabinieri, with "the cockade to the three Italian national colours in accordance with the established models". This was not an exception; similarly the tricolour cockade replaced the azure one, for example, on the frieze of the Bersaglieri caps and on the headdresses of the soldiers of the cavalry regiments. On the hat of the Carabinieri the azure cockade was present since the founding of the branch, which is dated 1814, while for the cavalry branch its introduction can be ascribed to 1843,

The azure cockade was instead used during the Sardinian campaign in central Italy in 1860, the siege of Gaeta (also dated 1860), the repression of post-unitary brigandage (1860–70) and the Third Italian War of Independence (1866), in all cases pinned on the uniforms of the generals and that of the officers of the Royal Italian Army.

The blue cockade was officially in use until 1 January 1948, when the Constitution of the Italian Republic came into force, being replaced, in all official locations, by the Italian tricolour cockade.

== Historical evolution of the cockade of Italy ==
=== In the institutional context ===
Kingdom of Piedmont-Sardinia (until 1861) and Kingdom of Italy (1861–1948)

Italian Republic (1948–present)

=== In the military field ===
Kingdom of Piedmont-Sardinia (until 1848)

Kingdom of Piedmont-Sardinia (1848–1861), Kingdom of Italy (1861–1948) and Italian Republic (1948–present)

=== In the aeronautical field ===
Corpo Aeronautico, Regia Aeronautica and Italian Air Force (1917–1918 and 1943–present)

Corpo Aeronautico and Regia Aeronautica (1918–1927)

Regia Aeronautica (on the fuselage only: 1927–1943)

Regia Aeronautica (only on the wings: 1935–1943)

Italian Air Force for low visibility procedures (1991–present)

=== In the sports field ===
Coppa Italia (1958–1985 and 2006–present)

Coppa Italia Dilettanti (1966–1985 and 2006–present)

Coppa Italia and Coppa Italia Dilettanti (1985–2006)

Coppa Italia Serie C (1972–present)

Coppa Italia Serie D (1999–present)

== See also ==
- Flag of Italy
- National symbols of Italy
- Tricolour Day
