= Museum of the Risorgimento =

Museum of the Risorgimento (Italian - Museo del Risorgimento) may refer to:

- Museum of the Risorgimento (Castelfidardo)
- Museum of the Risorgimento (Milan)
- Museum of the Risorgimento (Padua)
- Museum of the Risorgimento (Rome)
- Museum of the Risorgimento (Turin)
