= Andropolis, Egypt =

See Andropolis for namesakes

Andropolis was an Ancient city and former bishopric in Roman Egypt, and is now a Latin Catholic titular see.

== History ==
Andropolis, identified with modern Kherbeta in present Egypt, was important enough in the Roman province of Aegyptus Primus to become a suffragan of its Metropolitan, the patriarchate of Alexandria, but the see faded like most, plausibly at the advent of Islam.

- Its only undisputedly documented ('Greek') bishop, Zoilus, participated in a council of Alexandria convoked by Patriarch Atanasius in 362
- A Coptic bishop named Jacob allegedly occupied the see according to Klaas A. Worp.

== Titular see ==
The diocese was nominally restored in 1933 as Latin Titular bishopric of Andropolis (Latin) / Andropoli (Curiate Italian) / Andropolitan(us) (Latin adjective).

It has had the following incumbents, so far of the fitting Episcopal (lowest) rank :

- Henri Joseph Marius Piérard, Assumptionists (A.A.) (born Belgium) (1938.02.09 – 1959.11.10) as Apostolic Vicar of Beni in Belgian Congo (Congo-Kinshasa) (1938.02.09 – 1959.11.10); previously only Ecclesiastical Superior of Mission sui iuris of Beni in Belgian Congo (Congo-Kinshasa) (1934 – (see) promoted 1938.02.09); later 'first' Bishop of (promoted see) Beni in Congo (Congo-Kinshasa) (1959.11.10 – 1960.07.07), (see) restyled Bishop of Beni (now Butembo-Beni) (1960.07.07 – retired 1966.05.17), emeritate as Titular Bishop of Molicunza (1966.05.17 – retired 1973.04.27), died 1975
- Thomas Francis Maloney (1960.01.02 – death 1962.09.10) as Auxiliary Bishop of Diocese of Providence (Rhode Island, USA) (1960.01.02 – 1962.09.10)
- Enrique Bolaños Quesada (1962.12.06 – 1970.03.06) as Auxiliary Bishop of Diocese of Alajuela (Costa Rica) (1962.12.06 – 1970.03.06), also Secretary General of Episcopal Conference of Costa Rica (1963 – 1970); next succeeded as Bishop of Alajuela (1970.03.06 – retired 1980.12.13), died 1992
- Youhanna Golta (1986.07.27 – ...), first as Auxiliary Bishop of Alexandria of the Copts (Egypt) (1986.07.27 – 1997), then as Bishop of Curia of the Coptic Catholic Patriarchate of Alexandria (1986.07.27 – ...).

== See also ==
- List of Catholic dioceses in Egypt

== Sources and external links ==
- GCatholic - (former &) titular see

Bibliography - ecclesiastical

- Pius Bonifacius Gams, Series episcoporum Ecclesiae Catholicae, Leipzig 1931, p. 460
- Michel Lequien, 'Oriens christianus in quatuor Patriarchatus digestus, Paris 1740, vol. II, coll. 523-524
- Klaas A. Worp, A Checklist of Bishops in Byzantine Egypt (A.D. 325 - c. 750), in Zeitschrift für Papyrologie und Epigraphik 100 (1994) 283-318 (cfr. p. 296)
- S. Pétridès, lemma 'Andron polis', in Dictionnaire d'Histoire et de Géographie ecclésiastiques, vol. II, Paris 1914, coll. 1801-1802
