= The Year 3,000 =

1897 novel by Paolo Mantegazza

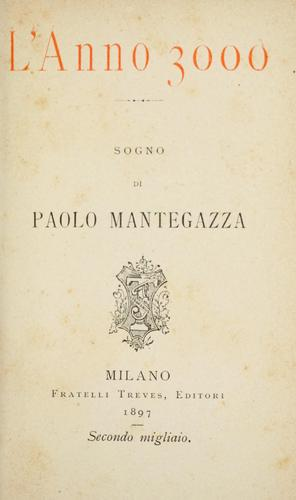
- Cover of the original edition
- Author: Paolo Mantegazza
- Original title: L’Anno 3000
- Language: Italian
- Genre: Science fiction Utopia
- Publication date: 1897
- Publication place: Italy
- Media type: Print

The Year 3,000 (Italian: L'Anno 3000) is a novel written in 1897 by Paolo Mantegazza, an Italian writer and physician. It is a short romance which follows the typical utopian forecasting of life and society in the future, which was common at the end of the 19th century in the Western countries, so enthused with the fantastic and exceedingly rapid new conquests of science and technology brought about by the Industrial Revolution and new forms of energy, such as electricity, and the plethora of inventions such as the telegraph, the telephone, the electric light, the phonograph, steam, internal combustion and electric engines, etc. Authors such as Jules Verne exploited successfully this desire of the public for prediction of the future, and Mantegazza belongs to this trend; he was a scientist with a strong optimism about the eventual victory of internationalism, pacifism, hedonism, etc.

In this book, Mantegazza foresees with remarkable accuracy important social and economic movements and global political changes which actually have occurred since the last decades of the 20th century, such as the defeat of the communist regimes and the appearance of the United Nations Organization and the European Community.

== The plot ==
Paolo and Maria (the same names as those of the author and his wife) are going to marry after the mandatory period of five years of experimentation "with love but not children" (Mantegazza was a sexual libertarian and wrote a very popular book explaining sexuality for young people, titled The Physiology of Love). So, they start a journey to Andropolis (the "city of man"), the huge (10 million inhabitants) and ultramodern capital of the "United Planetary States". They visit its political institutions, energy plants, libraries and theaters, laboratories and schools. Paul, acting as a guide, shows Maria around and describes and explains everything.

== Main concepts ==
Mantegazza was a neurophysiologist, and when he wrote the book, impressive discoveries were being made at a quick pace around European laboratories on the organization and function of the nervous system, by scientists like Santiago Ramón y Cajal, Charles Scott Sherrington, Emil du Bois-Reymond, and where the role of axons and synapses in the transmission of information and of neural networks were being elucidated. He also acknowledged the progress of psychopharmacology in discovering new drugs which affected the emotions, conscience, cognition, etc. (Mantegazza was the first to isolate cocaine from coca leaves and to praise its powerful effect on the human mind, by experimenting on himself). In the technological frontier, he describes the futuristic role of electricity in generating heat, movement and light and of instant telecommunications spanning the globe. Therefore, he apprehended the main factors which have really contributed to the 20th century society.

In one passage in the book, an engineer explains to Paolo and Maria:

"I believe that the speed of communications, obtained with steam and telegraph, has contributed more than all the books, all the newspapers, all the parliaments, laws, and even all religions; to destroy the criminal old order of war among peoples and to create a new moral, sane and sincere"

This was a kind of morally optimistic, pre-First World War scientific utopia.

== Predictions ==
Mantegazza was accurate in predicting technological developments which became a reality (or likely will be in the future). In the first three chapters he predicts the following:

- A keyboard-controlled private two-seat airplane with electric engines (the "acrotach", meaning something speedy in a high place), with a full electric panel with flight instruments, including compass, temperature, wind direction, flight speed and distance indicators, flying at 150 km/h;
- This airplane could be transformed rapidly into an electrically operated boat ("hydrotach"), by adapting a ring of inflated rubber around it;
- Air conditioning in all vehicles and public places;
- Synthetic foods made out of proteins and carbohydrates
- Drugs for boosting happiness, physical strength and love;
- A network of clean, "cosmic" energy produced in silent, compact plants ("pandynamos"), operated by a single worker, and distributed through a network of wires extending all over the world. Energy is distributed by demand, following requests transmitted by a network of "camera obscura" terminals which display white letters on a black background
- Artificial brains and artificial intelligence and thinking, in devices which imitate biological brains, built of artificial neural networks made of synthetic protoplasm;
- Movie theaters ("panopticons") which delivered all sorts of entertainment and instructional programs, by transmitting virtual reality directly to the sensory systems of spectators, including odors, movement sensation, etc.;
- Medical examinations using rays which rendered the whole body transparent to vision, in real time, in three dimensions (one must remember that only two years before Wilhelm Röntgen had discovered x-rays);
- Prebuilt houses, using liquid plastic poured over a steel structure;
- Five six-hour days per workweek and much spare time for entertainment and education;
- Credit cards and paper-based money using a global currency;
- A global "cosmic" language, substituting for all dead European languages.

In the first chapter Mantegazza predicted the First World War, with two sides fighting bloody, immense naval and ground battles and with "one million deaths in a single day" near Paris. After this war, all nations unite to abolish war (" a war that killed all wars") and the "United States of Europe was founded", with a single idiom and a single currency, engendering peace for the succeeding two millennia. After almost a century of dictatorial domination, socialist regimes were replaced by democratic ones.

Besides predicting for the year 3000 things that would become reality less than 50 years later, Mantegazza was mistaken only a few times. One of the most peculiar errors, considering that he was a physician, was his judgment that the average longevity would be 60 years, and that medicine would abandon drugs, surgery and other forms of conventional therapy, focusing instead on changes in diet and life style (like functional medicine in the 21st century).

== Bibliography ==
- Mantegazza, P.: L'Anno 3000. Milano, 1897. (in Italian: Zipped RTF full text from Nigralatebra, or HTML full text with concordance from IntraText Digital Library).
- Mantegazza, P. (2010). The Year 3000. A Dream. Translated by David Jacobson. Edited, with introduction and notes, by Nicoletta Pireddu. Lincoln: University of Nebraska Press. ISBN 978-0803267909.
