= Laura Solera Mantegazza =

Italian philanthropist and social reformer (1813–1873)

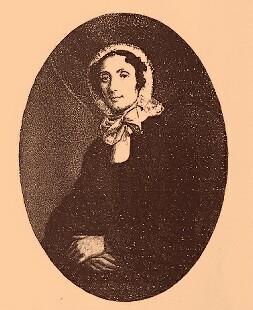
Laura Solera Mantegazza (ca. 1865)

Laura Solera Mantegazza (15 January 1813 – 15 September 1873) was an Italian patriot, philanthropist and fundraiser, among the most important female leading figures of Risorgimento. For her motherhood model and her commitment to the education of poor people her contemporaries called her "mother of all the poor".

== Early life ==
Solera was born in Milan, only daughter of the lawyer Cristoforo Solera and Giuseppina Landriani, members of the Lombard bourgeoisie. Her family was characterized by strong patriotism, among her relatives there were general Francesco Solera, member of the provisional government of Venice in 1848, and Temistocle Solera, opera librettist and collaborator of Giuseppe Verdi.

Educated at home by her mother, after her death Solera was entrusted by the father to a guardian, while he was forced to flee to Switzerland. Instead of an autonomous marriage, that was becoming common among the upper-classes, Solera's marriage was arranged by her guardian. As a result, the seventeen-year-old Solera married the older Giovan Battista Mantegazza, a nobleman from Monza. The couple settled in Monza and between 1831 and 1837 Solera gave birth to their three children: Paolo, Costanza, and Emilio Mantegazza.

== Participation in 1848 revolution ==
The marriage between Solera and her husband was never happy, as witnessed by her elder son's diary who expressed also harsh words towards his father. Because of that, on the pretext of seeking better schools for her children, in 1837 Solera moved back from Monza to Milan and until 1848 she personally took care of their education following the model of "mother as educator of good citizens" adopted by many patriot women of that period. Very cultured woman, Solera taught her children to read and write, the basics of Latin, French, English, and German and, to help her son Paolo to cultivate his passions, she studied ancient Greek and Chemistry. Solera was also very sensitive to the pedagogical theories and maintained a close correspondence with experts in the field, such as Raffaello Lambruschini and Giuseppe Sacchi, to ensure the best education to her children.

In the 1840s Solera intensified her relations with Giuseppe Mazzini and at the outbreak of the revolution in 1848 she entirely devoted herself to the Italian cause. She remained at the side of her husband and older son Paolo, volunteers in the Milanese troops, helping the insurgents in the barricades of Milan, embodying the prototype of the "patriot mother". The figure was elaborated on the eve of 1948 by the Italian national movement, which saw the woman – wife and mother – as responsible for the regeneration of the family and therefore of the nation. Solera gave these attributes also to the protagonist of the ode, La madre lombarda nel 23 marzo 1848, she wrote and sold door-to-door at the end of the Five Days of Milan, to collect money for the wounded.

Forced to leave Milan following the return of the Austrians, Solera took shelter in the family villa in Cannero Riviera, Piedmont, near the Swiss border. There, she organized the rescue and care of patriots and volunteers, led by Giuseppe Garibaldi, injured during the battle of Luino and a fundraising for the purchase of weapons to be sent to Venice.

== Philanthropic commitment ==
In her private correspondence with friends, Solera frequently expressed her intense passion for the Italian cause, for which she would have sacrificed her own life and her children's. But at the same time she confessed to feel deeply sorry for being a woman and therefore unable to take up arms. The difficulties dictated by gender identity and the simultaneous failure of the revolution with the Salasco's armistice which led to the return of the Austrians to Milan, brought Solera to refocus her patriotism towards philanthropy. In the years after 1848 until her death, she devoted herself to the opening of crèches, schools and associations for women workers.

=== Pio Istituto di maternità per i bambini lattanti e slattati ===
Solera began a collaboration with the pedagogist Giuseppe Sacchi, which resulted in the inauguration of the Pio Istituto di maternità per i bambini lattanti e slattati di Milano (Pio Maternity Institute for Infants and Children of Milan), in May 1850. Considered the first creche in Italy, it became also an instrument of nationalization of the working class women. Throughout the institution the aim of Solera was to create good mothers of good future citizens of the unified Italy. Solera's project met with the opposition of the church, which tried to dissuade the City Council Milan from granting permission for the opening of the institute.

The special statute of the association allowed Solera to fulfill the role of president alongside Sacchi, at a time when women were not yet allowed to be members of boards of directors. The philanthropist involved in her project several patriots and militants of the national movement, including Nerina Noè, Maria Praga Marogna, Ismenia Sormani Castelli and the nobelwoman Marianna Teresa Crivelli which followed Solera also in her later projects.

=== Associazione di mutuo soccorso delle operaje ===
In 1860 Solera mobilized with fundraisers in favor of the Expedition of the Thousand. This allowed the philanthropist to resume contact with Giuseppe Garibaldi, whom she met again after the Battle of Aspromonte in 1862, where the general was wounded and imprisoned. Solera took care of him during the recovery and in this occasion she offered him the presidency of the newly founded Associazione di mutuo soccorso delle operaje di Milano (Association for mutual aid of female workers). The association became the female section of the already existing Società di mutuo soccorso degli operai di Milano (Society for mutual aid of the workers), conceived in continuity with the Pio Institute. A school was opened to offered literacy courses to the workers, but its main aim remained the promotion of the model of national motherhood, based on breastfeeding and the campaign against the exposure of legitimate children.

The association became an important space for the political education of Milanese women and represented an innovation for that time. The group remained independent from the male section and was led by a board consist of both bourgeois and working-class women, where all the members had the right to vote and stand for election. This, along with the different cultural climate compared to 1848, led, at the end of the 1960s, to a challenging of Solera's vision by her disciples, like Giulia Sacchi, whose interest was no longer towards the education of "good mothers", but to the claiming of women's rights.

== Later years and death ==
=== Scuola professionale femminile ===
In 1870 Solera founded in Milan her last institution, a professional girls school (Scuola Professionale Femminile). The school was thought in continuity with the other foundations she established, and was intended to teach girls the care of children and the management of the house. Although it continues to be operational today, initially it did not have the same success as the first two institutions founded by Solera, partly because of the absence of the philanthropist whose health conditions led to her retire to the family villa in Cannero Rivera. There she died at the age of 60, on 15 September 1873.

In accordance to her will, Solera was buried in Milan.

== Legacy ==
Solera's work was carried on by her daughter Costanza and her collaborators, in particular Alessandrina Ravizza, who opened new Pio Institut locations in Milan and in other Lombardy's cities, some of which are still operational today.

The street of Milan where the first Pio institute was opened is now entitled to Solera.

== See also ==
- Giuseppe Garibaldi
- Giuseppe Mazzini
- Risorgimento
- Philanthropy
- Patriotism
- Paolo Mantegazza
- Unification of Italy
