= Museum of the Risorgimento (Turin) =

National Museum of the Italian Risorgimento
- Museo nazionale del Risorgimento italiano
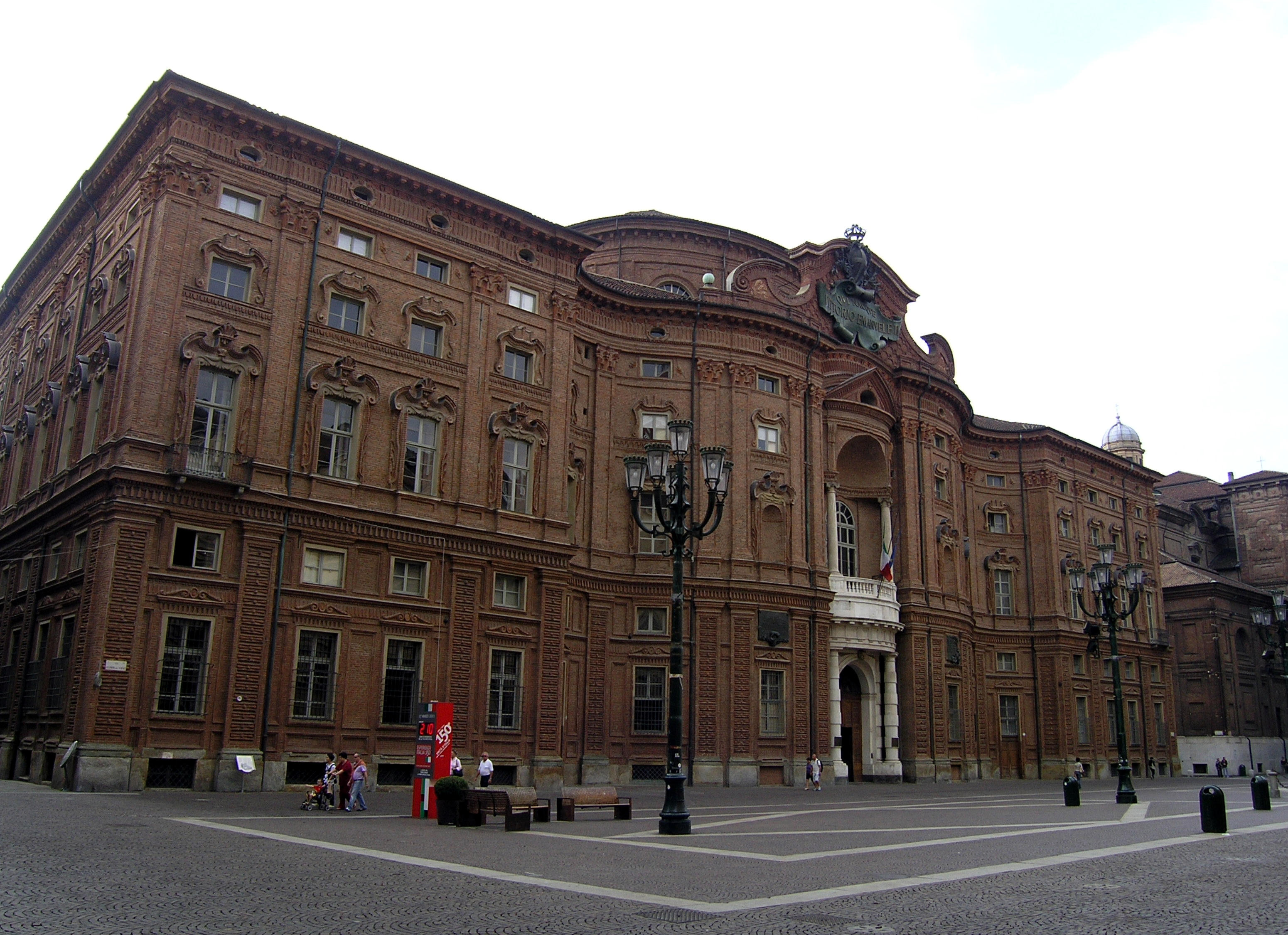

- Location within Turin
- Established: 1878
- Location: Turin, Italy
- Coordinates: 45.0691°N 7.6851°W
- Type: Historical and military museum
- Collections: period spanning from the Siege of Turin (1706) to the foundation of the Italian Republic (1946)
- Visitors: 150,000 (2016)
- Director: Umberto Levra
- Website: www.museorisorgimentotorino.it

The National Museum of the Italian Risorgimento (Italian: Museo nazionale del Risorgimento italiano) is the first, the biggest and the most important among the 23 museums in Italy dedicated to the Risorgimento; and the only one which can be considered "national" according to a 1901 law, and due to its rich and great collections. It is housed in the Palazzo Carignano in Turin.

== History ==
The museum was established in 1878, shortly after Italian unification, even though it only had its first permanent exhibition in 1908. Originally located in the Mole Antonelliana, in 1938 it was moved to its current site (which had previously housed the Subalpine Chamber of Deputies, from 1848 to 1860, and then the first Italian Chamber of Deputies, from 1861 to 1865).

== Displays ==
Its exhibits include weapons, flags, uniforms, printed and written documents (including the original manuscript of the song Il Canto degli Italiani, dated 10 November 1847 by Goffredo Mameli, now Italian national anthem since 1946), and artworks. The new exhibition, which opened on 18 March 2011, occupies about 3500 square metres across 30 rooms, and covers the real Risorgimento period, stretching from the late 18th century revolutions to the beginning of the First World War. It includes a specialized library, a print cabinet and a documentary archive.
