= Architectural and artistic works of the Vittoriano =

Architectural and artistic works of the Victor Emmanuel II Monument in Rome, Italy

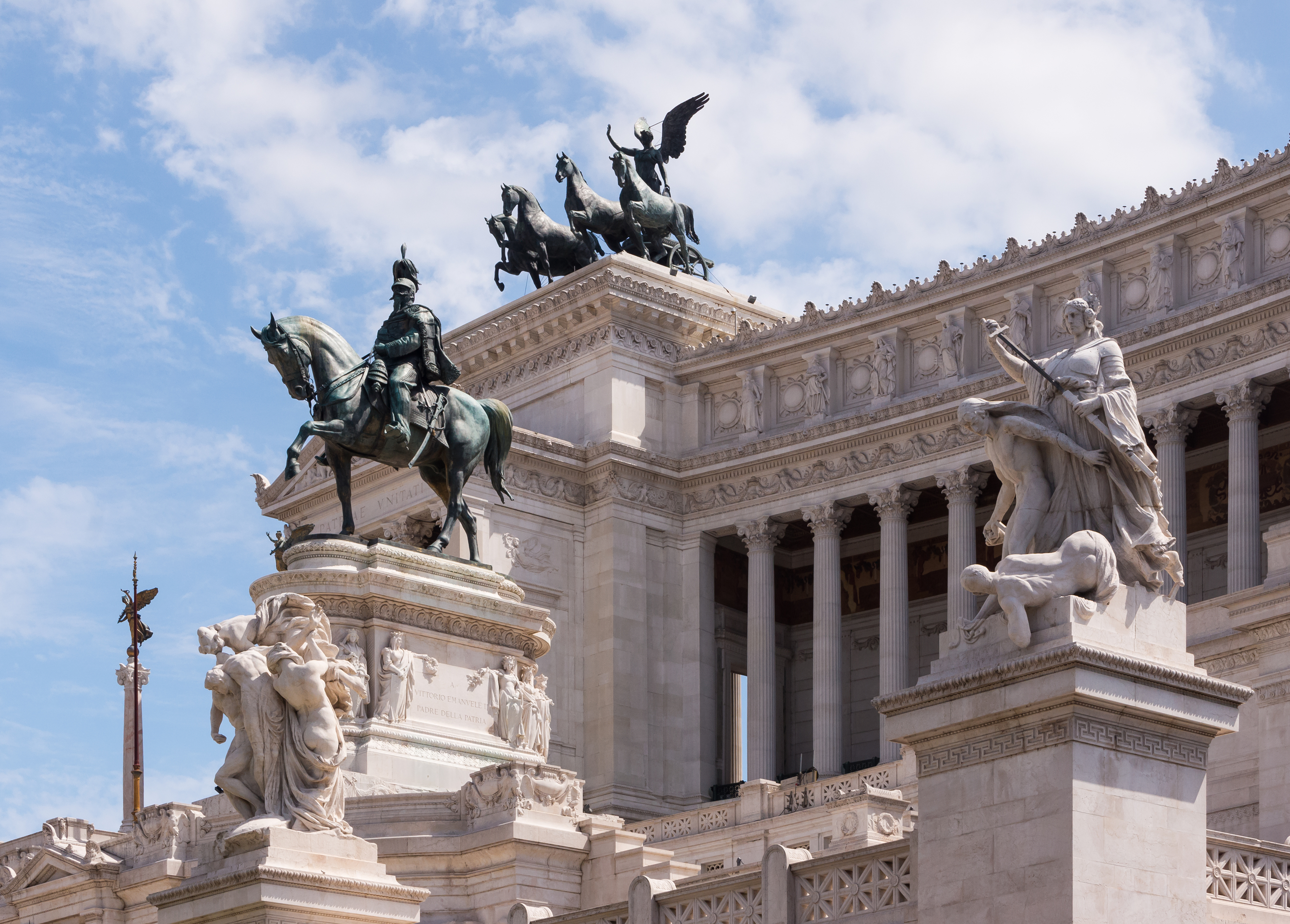
Glimpse of the artistic and architectural works of the Vittoriano

The architectural and artistic works of the Vittoriano, an Italian national monument located in Rome on the northern slope of the Capitoline Hill, represent, through allegories and personifications, the virtues and sentiments that motivated Italians during the Risorgimento, the period during which Italy achieved its national unity and liberation from foreign domination. For this reason, the Vittoriano is considered one of Italy's patriotic symbols.

It was the monument's designer, Giuseppe Sacconi, who decided to place only exclusively allegorical works of art, because he believed that only through art devoid of any reference to contemporaneity could the monument be given a universal value that would not be affected by the passage of time. Sacconi had to repeatedly counter the various proposals to place inside the building works of art that also represented precise historical figures and facts, beyond, naturally, King Victor Emmanuel II, to whom the monument is dedicated.

The architectural centerpiece of the Vittoriano is the equestrian statue of Victor Emmanuel II, the only non-allegorical representation in the monument. The term "Vittoriano" derives precisely from the name of Victor Emmanuel II of Savoy, the first king of united Italy, one of the protagonists of the Risorgimento and the process of Italian unification, so much so that he is referred to by historiography as one of the four "Fathers of the Fatherland," along with Cavour, for his political and diplomatic work, Garibaldi, for his military actions, and Mazzini, whose thought illuminated the minds and actions of Italian patriots.

== Floor plan of the Vittoriano ==
1. Entrance of the Vittoriano with artistic gate by Manfredo Manfredi;
2. Sculptural group The Thought by Giulio Monteverde;
3. Sculptural group The Action by Francesco Jerace;
4. Fountain of the Adriatic by Emilio Quadrelli;
5. Sculptural group The Strength by Augusto Rivalta;
6. Sculptural group The Concord by Lodovico Pogliaghi;
7. Fountain of the Tyrrhenian by Pietro Canonica;
8. Sculptural group The Sacrifice by Leonardo Bistolfi;
9. Sculptural group The Law by Ettore Ximenes;
10. Winged Lions by Giuseppe Tonnini
  (one statue on each side);
11. Entrance staircase;
12. Winged Victory on naval ram by Edoardo Rubino;
13. Winged Victory on naval ram by Edoardo De Albertis;
14. Altar of the Fatherland, which houses the tomb of the Unknown Soldier;
15. Statue of the Goddess Roma by Angelo Zanelli;
16. Statues of the Fourteen Noble Cities by Eugenio Maccagnani;
17. Equestrian statue of Victor Emmanuel II by Enrico Chiaradia;
18. Winged victory on triumphal column by Nicola Cantalamessa Papotti;
19. Winged victory on triumphal column by Adolfo Apolloni;
20. Propylaeum with colonnade on the top of which is present
  the Quadriga of Unity by Carlo Fontana;
21. Winged Victory on triumphal column by Mario Rutelli;
22. Winged Victory on triumphal column by Arnaldo Zocchi;
23. Propylaeum with colonnade on the top of which is
  the Quadriga of Liberty by Paolo Bartolini;
24. Sommoportico with colonnade;
  on the cornice are present
  statues representing the regions of Italy;
  on the terrace under the stylobate,
  there are the memorial stones of the redeemed cities.

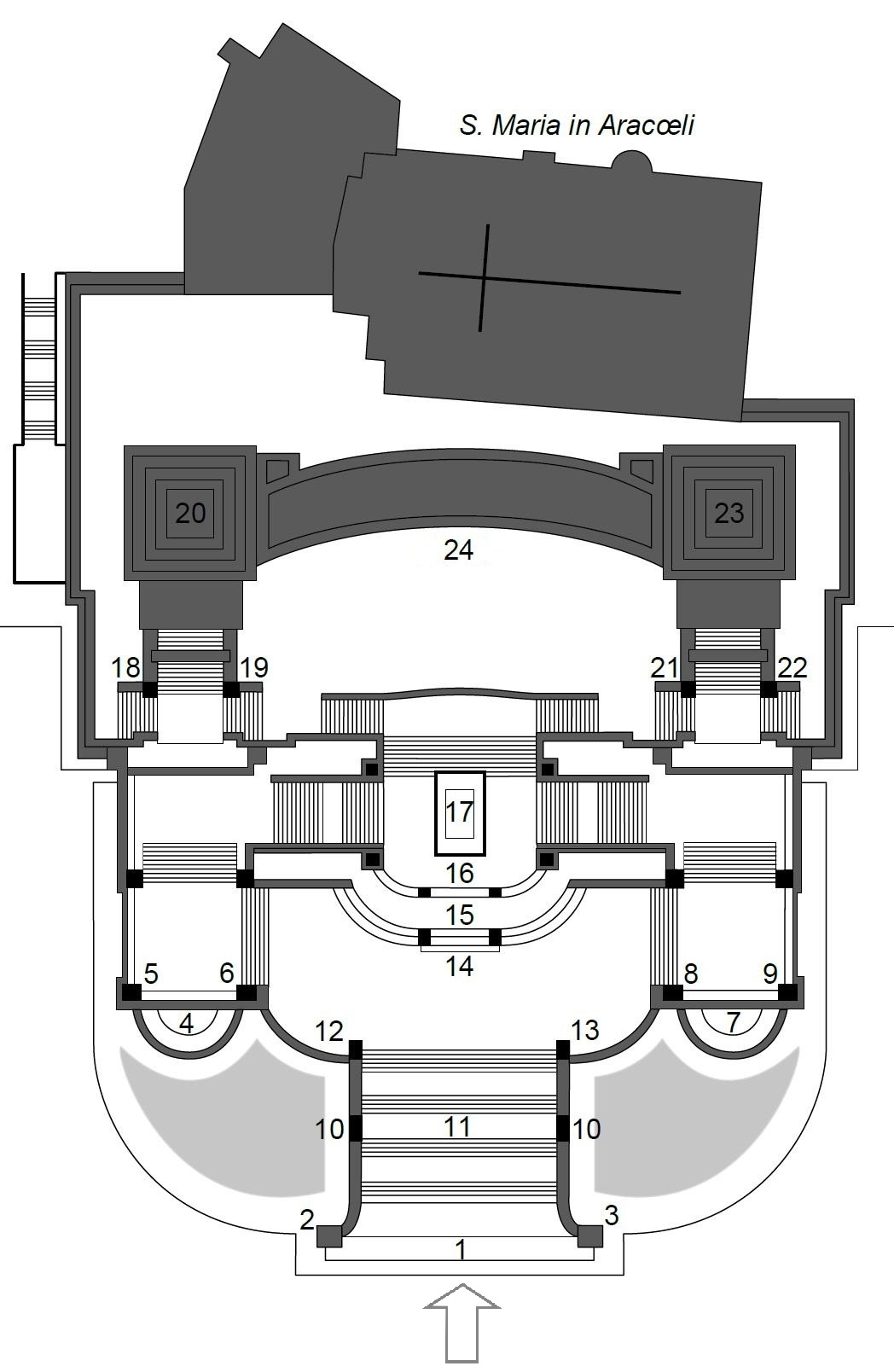
Piantina schematica del Vittoriano

== Overview ==
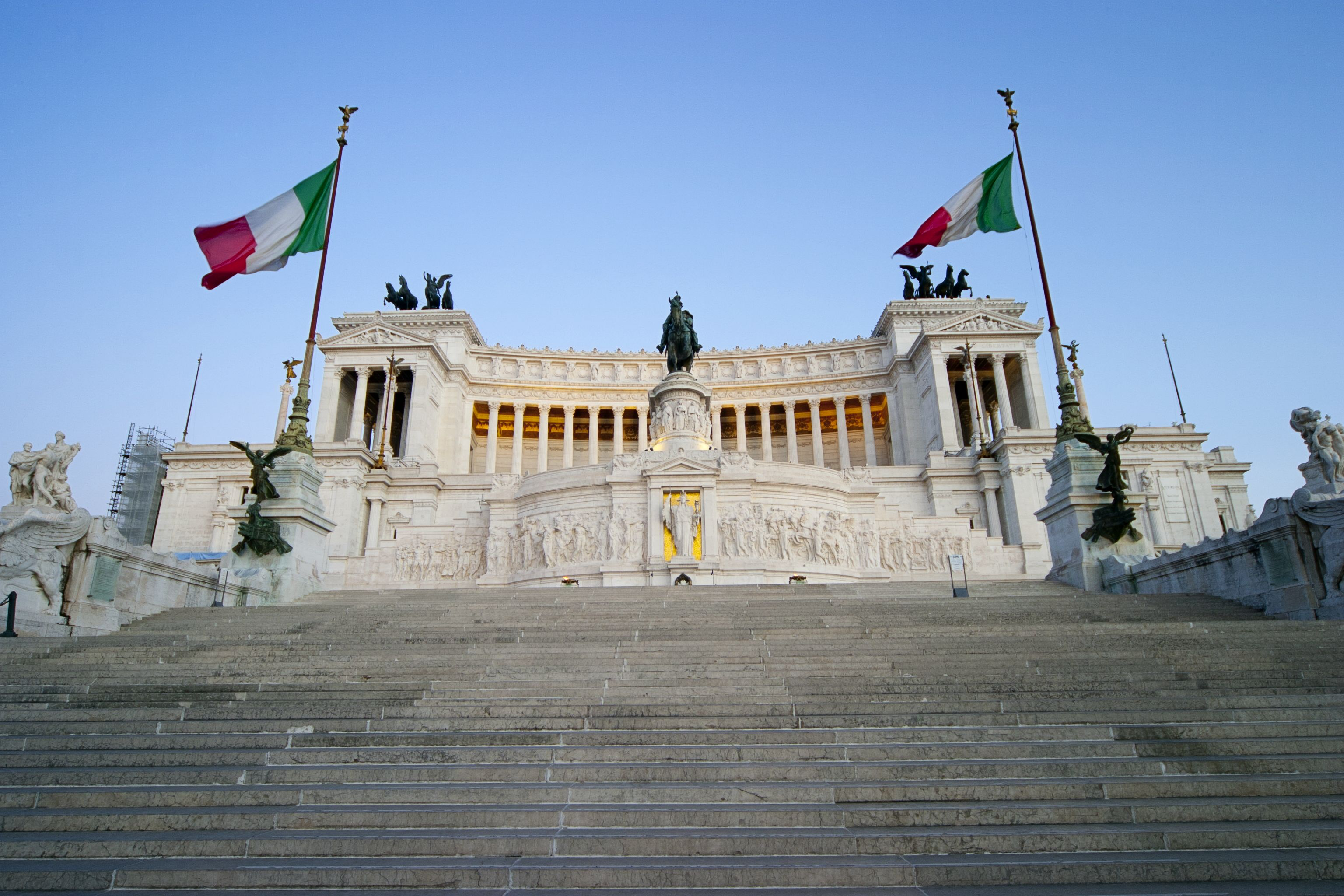
The entrance staircase to the Vittoriano, leading to the Altar of the Fatherland, visible in the center of the image, below the equestrian statue of Victor Emmanuel II. At the top of the Vittoriano can be seen the two lateral propylaea and the imposing central colonnade of the sommoportico

Rising on the Capitoline Hill, the Vittoriano stands in the symbolic center of ancient Rome and is connected to modern Rome by roads that radiate out from Piazza Venezia. The monumental complex of the Vittoriano is 70 meters high (81 meters if the crowning quadrigas of the two propylaea are included), 135 meters wide, 130 meters deep, occupies an area of 17 550 square meters and possesses, due to the conspicuous development of the interior spaces, a walkable area of 717 000 square meters. The entrance staircase is 41 meters wide and 34 meters long, while the terrace where the Altar of the Fatherland is located is 66 meters wide. The maximum depth of the Vittoriano's basement reaches 17 meters below street level. The colonnade consists of 15-meter-high columns, and the length of the portico is 72 meters. Since June 2007, it has been possible to ascend to the terrace of the Quadrigas by taking advantage of an elevator: this terrace, which is the highest in the monument, can also be reached via 196 steps that start at the sommoportico.

One of the architecturally predominant elements of the Vittoriano are the external stairways, consisting of a total of 243 steps, and the portico located at the top of the monument, sandwiched between two lateral propylaea. The portico of the Vittoriano is called the "sommoportico" because of its elevated position (from "sommo," meaning "high," "great," "highest part.") Another architecturally significant element is the wide colonnade of Corinthian order that characterizes the sommoportico and the two propylaea.

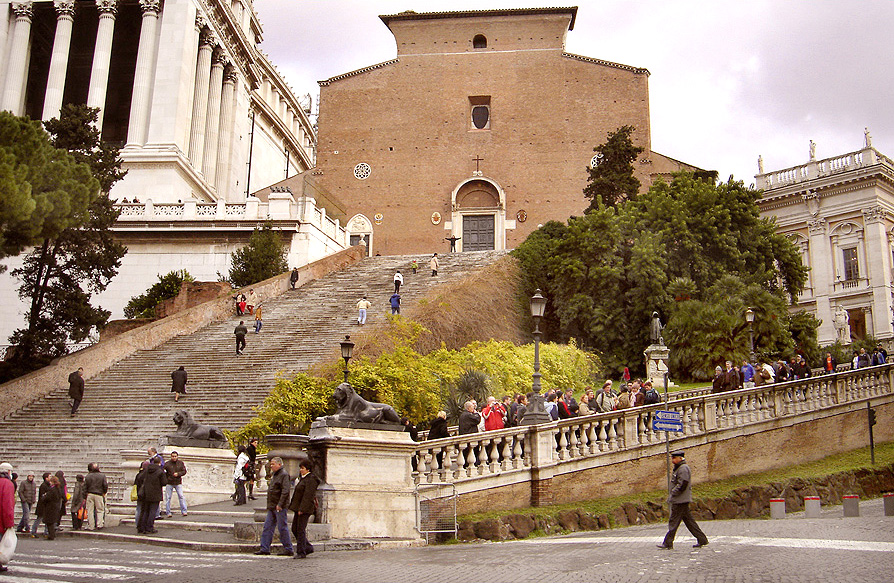
The basilica of the Ara Coeli. On the left is a glimpse of the Vittoriano

The allegories (i.e., abstract concepts expressed through concrete images) of the Vittoriano's artistic works represent, according to the canons of the Neoclassical style, mostly the virtues and sentiments, often rendered through personifications, that motivated the Italians in their struggles for national unity during the Risorgimento, understood as the period from the uprisings of 1820-1821 to the capture of Rome (1870), or, according to others, to victory in World War I. In the Vittoriano, statues of winged Victories, both in marble and bronze, stand out as symbols of the auspiciousness of the realization of Italian national unity.

There are also numerous artistic works that recall the history of ancient Rome. In fact, since its inauguration, the Vittoriano complex also celebrates the greatness and majesty of Rome, which is elected to the role of the legitimate capital of Italy. Various plant symbols are present, including the palm (recalling victory), oak (strength), laurel (victorious peace), myrtle (sacrifice) and olive (concord). All the works of art created for the Vittoriano engaged the major artists then active in Italy.

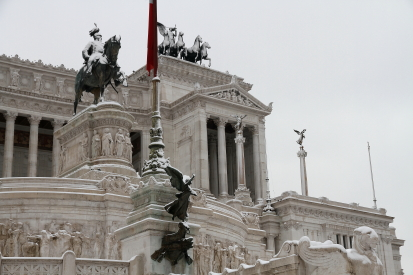
The snow-capped Vittoriano

The Vittoriano contains widespread allegorical meanings that, in the intentions of their makers, should have been clear and unambiguous. According to some authors, however, this goal was not achieved, as the works, in their view, often suffered from ambiguous interpretations. Those who argue for this inherent ambivalence of the Vittoriano find its causes in the Risorgimento, which, according to the revisionist view, was characterized by a dual nature: on the one hand there would have been the patriots, and on the other hand the silent majority, consisting mainly of peasants and the middle class, who would have remained indifferent to the process of Italian unification. The patriots themselves, moreover, had different views on the future system of Italian government: from the beginning they were in fact divided into centralists and federalists, into monarchists and republicans. All of them, in any case, recognized themselves in the same tricolor flag and shared the same ideals of unity and independence.

To this must be added the historical stratification and the profound difference in the Vittoriano's public use, particularly the political contrast between liberal and fascist Italy in spreading their respective political messages. While liberal Italy saw the Vittoriano as a secular temple where the unity and freedom of the homeland could be metaphorically celebrated, Fascism viewed the monument as a stage where the country's aggressive military might could be flaunted. Finally, since the birth of the Italian Republic it has been regarded as the "forum of the Republic."

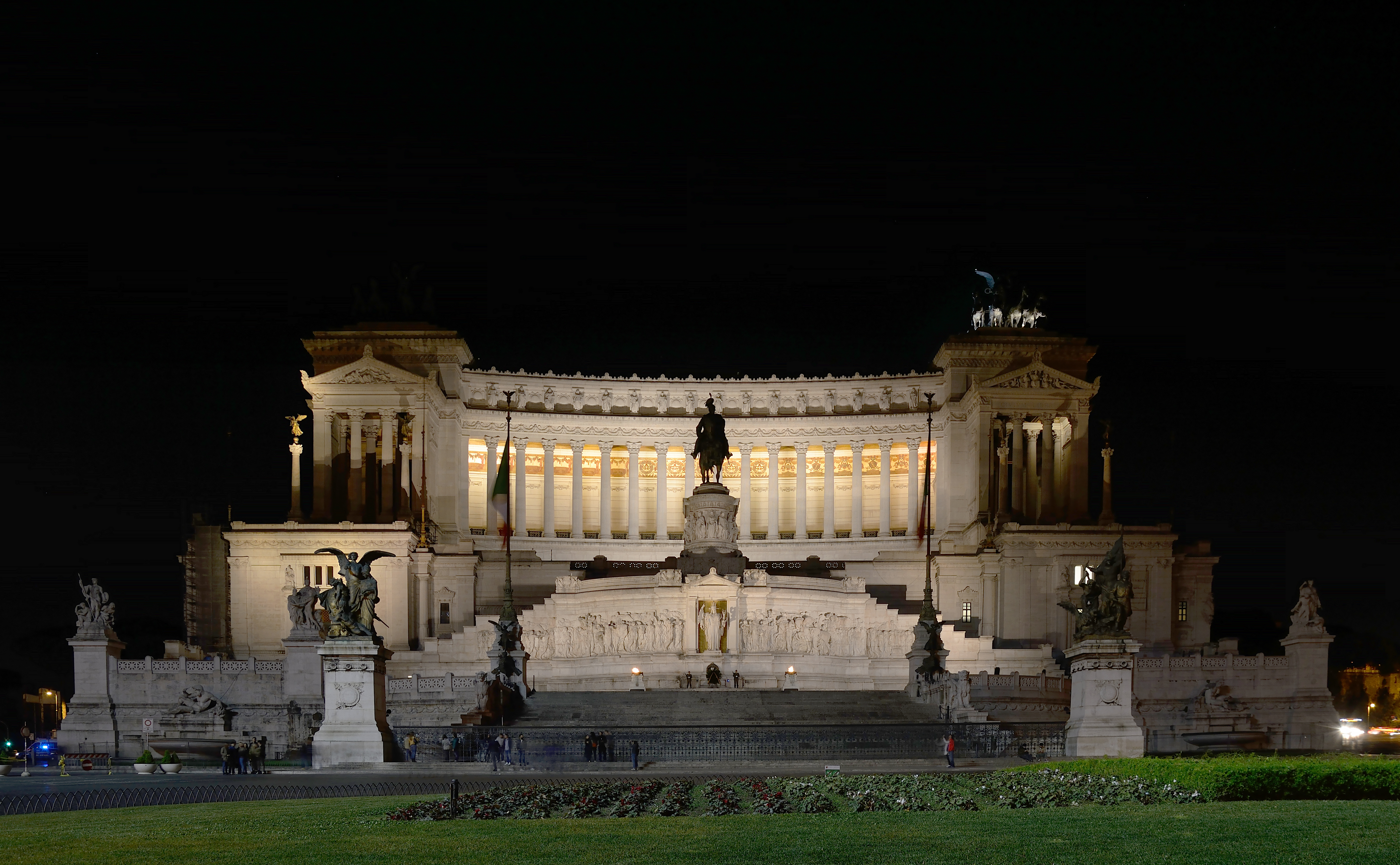
The Vittoriano at night

From a stylistic point of view, the architecture and works of art that embellish the Vittoriano were conceived with the aim of creating a "national style," a model to be used later in other areas as well. This was, in fact, the need expressed by art critics in the first decades of unification, in which the nation was fine-tuning its identity also from an artistic point of view. This "national style," according to Camillo Boito, who was its theorist, could not be new in plan, but rather, in order to have a fully national character, it would have to connect to the Italian architecture of the past; the study of the classics, however, was to be considered a point of departure and not of arrival. This is what Sacconi wanted to achieve and felt obliged to.

In this regard, for the realization of the Vittoriano, Giuseppe Sacconi took his cue from neoclassical architecture, the heir of classical Greek and Roman architecture, on which Italic elements were grafted according to the spirit of Eclecticism. Sacconi also kept in mind the architectural style in vogue during the Second French Empire of Napoleon III (1852-1870), which was very common in the new buildings constructed in Paris at that time, leading to the complete transformation of the French capital; in fact, this style was the only one he appreciated among those contemporary to him, although he disagreed with its excessive ornamentation and sumptuousness. According to some authors, Sacconi was also inspired by the forms used, including in the colonial sphere, by several imperialist nations of the time such as the United Kingdom, France, the German Empire, and Belgium.

== The fountains of the two seas ==
Leaning against the Vittoriano's exterior basement, on either side of the entrance gate to Piazza Venezia, are the "fountains of the two seas," dedicated to the Adriatic Sea and the Tyrrhenian Sea, respectively. Both are set in a flowerbed and possess, since their origin, a hydraulic system that recycles their water, avoiding waste. At one time, there was also an active 500,000-liter water cistern, later abandoned, located in the monument's basement.

The two fountains represent the two major Italian seas, which line the side shores of the Italian peninsula, symbolized instead by the Vittoriano: In this way, the entire country is represented, also geographically. To the right of the fountain of the Adriatic Sea are the remains of the tomb of Gaius Publicus Bibulus, a monument from the Republican era and an important landmark for ancient Roman toponymy.

Work	Description	Author	Image
Fountain of the Adriatic Sea	It is located to the left of the entrance to the Vittoriano. It is an allegorical personification representing the Adriatic Sea, with one arm facing East and the other resting on a Lion of St. Mark, symbolizing the city of Venice.	Emilio Quadrelli	
Fountain of the Tyrrhenian Sea	It is located to the right of the entrance to the Vittoriano. It is an allegorical personification representing the Tyrrhenian Sea, lying on the Capitoline Wolf and with one arm resting on a sculpture on which is carved the siren Parthenope to symbolize the cities of Rome and Naples, respectively.	Pietro Canonica	

== The external stairways and terraces ==
=== Features ===
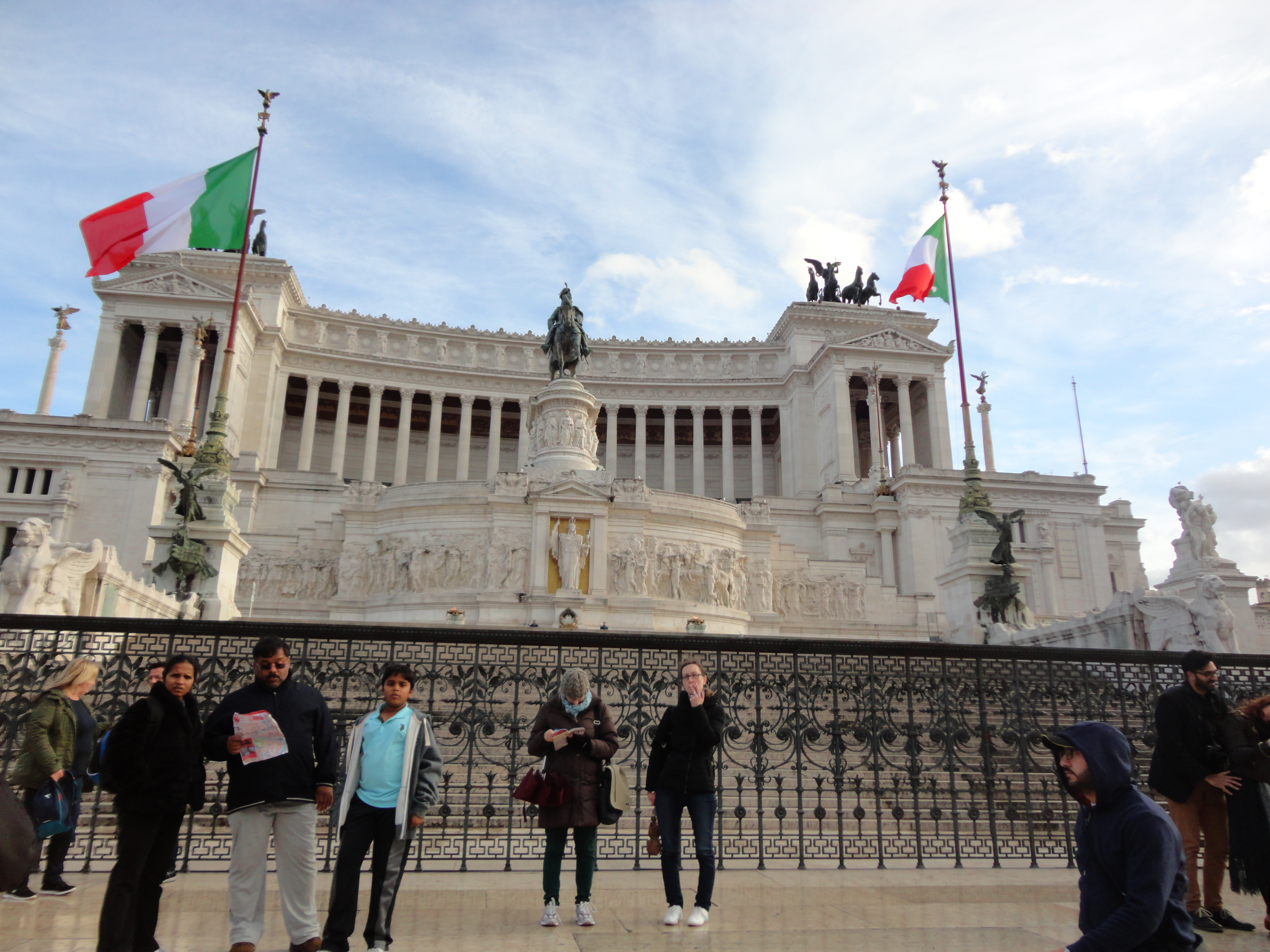
The artistic gate that closes the entrance to the Vittoriano

The Vittoriano's external staircases fit the sides of the northern slope of the Capitoline Hill and lead, starting from the entrance in Piazza Venezia, to the terrace of the Altar of the Fatherland, then to the terrace of the redeemed cities (the one immediately below the colonnade of the sommoportico) and finally to the terraces of the two propylaea, which flank the sommoportico, constituting its entrances.

The Vittoriano was conceived as a large forum open to the citizens, a kind of elevated square in the heart of the capital organized as an agora on three levels where there are ample spaces reserved for the transit and stopping of visitors, of which the stairways and terraces constitute the fundamental element.

The monument, as a whole, appears as a kind of marble covering of the northern slope of the Capitoline Hill: it was therefore conceived as a place where it is possible to take an uninterrupted patriotic walk among the works present, almost all of which have allegorical meanings related to the history of Italy. In fact, the path has no architectural end, as there are two entrances to the highest part, one for each propylaeum.

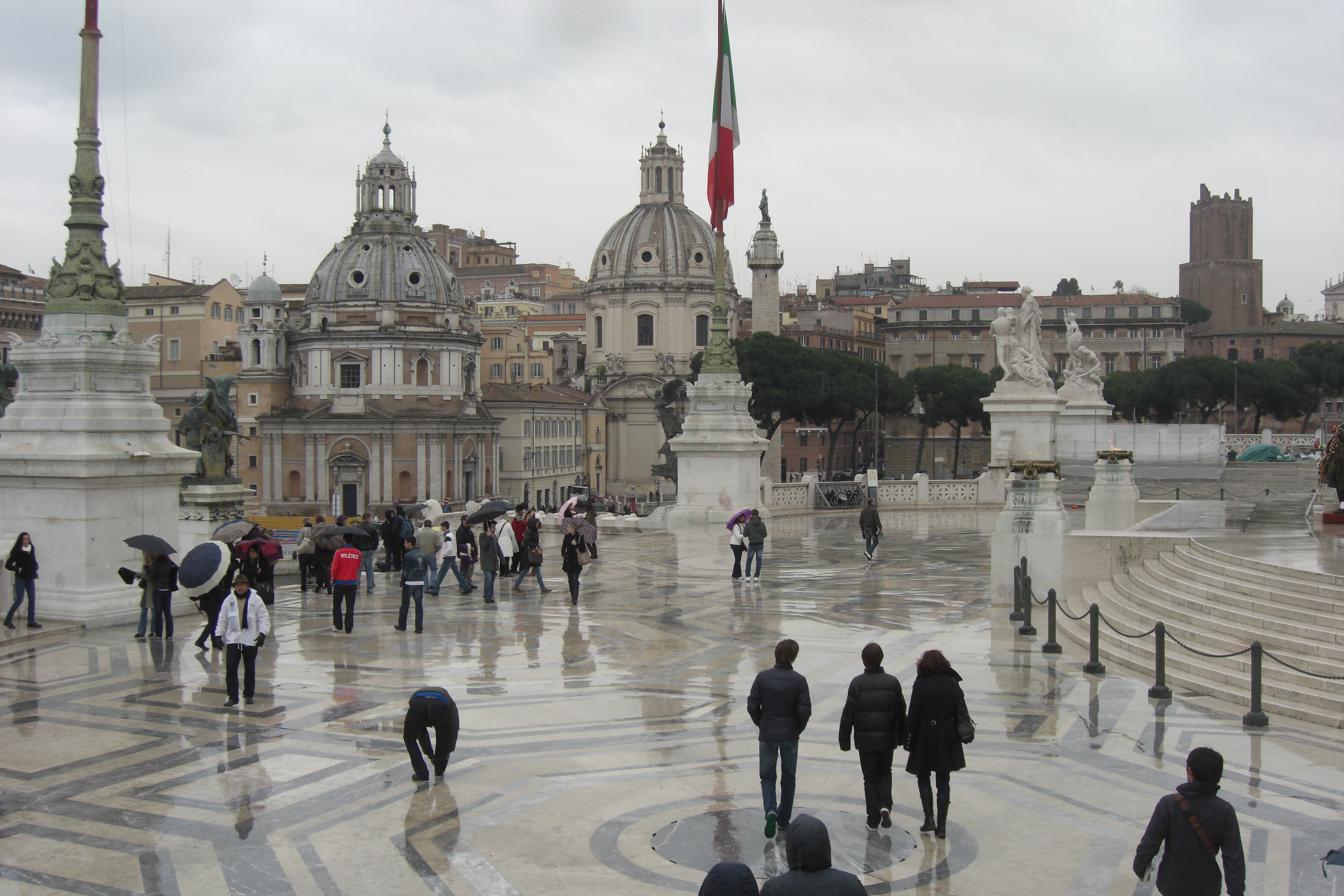
The terrace of the Altar of the Fatherland, located at the end of the entrance staircase to the Vittoriano, which can be seen on the left, between the two flagpoles on which as many Italian flags fly. The access staircase to the Altar of the Fatherland, on the other hand, can be glimpsed on the right

The path along the staircase continues even beyond the tomb of the Unknown Soldier to symbolically represent a continuous and uninterrupted procession of Italians that continues its walk to the highest point of the building, namely the sommoportico and propylaea. The Vittoriano was conceived as a place where it is possible to take an uninterrupted patriotic walk (in fact, the route has no architectural end, since there are two entrances to the highest part, one for each propylaeum) among the works present, almost all of which have allegorical meanings related to the history of Italy.

At the entrance there is an imposing staircase leading to the terrace of the Altar of the Fatherland and the Unknown Soldier and representing the Vittoriano's first elevated platform as well as its symbolic center. The path along the staircase also continues beyond the Tomb of the Unknown Soldier to symbolically represent a continuous and uninterrupted procession of Italians continuing their walk to the highest point of the building: the sommoportico and propylaea.

The artistic entrance gate to the Vittoriano, the work of Manfredo Manfredi, has the peculiarity of being "retractable," meaning that it can slide vertically underground by means of rails. The system that allows the lowering of the railing, originally hydraulic, was considered at the time of its construction to be among the most technologically advanced in the world. The entrance gate is 40 meters long and weighs 10,500 tons.

=== The entrance staircase ===
On either side of the entrance steps are a series of sculptures that accompany visitors to the Altar of the Fatherland. The first sculptures one encounters are two gilded bronze sculptural groups, with subjects inspired by Giuseppe Mazzini's thought: The Thought and The Action (on the left and right of the staircase, respectively, for those coming from Piazza Venezia), followed by two sculptural groups (again, one on each side) depicting as many Winged Lions, and finally, at the top of the staircase, before the beginning of the terrace of the Altar of the Fatherland, two Winged Victories.

The presence of these figures is not accidental, but rather has a precise symbolic meaning. In fact, Thought and Action were fundamental in the process of Italian unification, given that they are necessary to change the course of history and to transform a society. The overall shape of the two sculptural groups recalls the intrinsic characteristics of the two concepts: The Action has a triangular, angular outline, while The Thought has a circular shape. The two winged Lions represent the initiation of patriots who decide to join the Italian unification undertaking motivated by ardor and strength, which also control their instinctive side. The Winged Victories, in addition to recalling the military and cultural achievements of the Roman era, allegorically symbolize the good omen brought about by the realization of national unity.

Work	Description	Author	Image
The Thought	It is located to the left of the staircase. A bronze winged Genius represents The Thought, who rests a hand on the personification of The Wisdom, from whom he allegorically takes inspiration, and who helps The People to rise up encouraged by the goddess Minerva. The composition is completed by the Genius of War sharpening his weapons ready for battle, and by The Discord, who is holding a torch and a scourge, by means of which she puts to flight The Tyranny, which is now at the end of its tether.	Giulio Monteverde	
The Action	It is located to the right of the staircase. The Action, rendered allegorically by a group of soldiers of the Savoy army, raises the flag of Italy on which the words "Italy" and "Victor" are inscribed, while a Lion of Venice crushes the oppressor, a woman holding a club is ready to throw herself at the enemy, and a young Garibaldian (the only figure in the entire Vittoriano, other than the equestrian statue of Victor Emmanuel II, wearing contemporary clothing) prepares for the assault and a commoner cries out for redemption.	Francesco Jerace	
Winged Lion	These are two marble statues representing a winged Lion crouching on the balustrade. The two Winged Lions represent the initiation of patriots who decide to join the Italian unification undertaking motivated by ardor and strength, which also control their instinctive side.	Giuseppe Tonnini	
Winged Victory	These are two bronze statues depicting a winged Victory soaring on a base decorated with naval rams. The Winged Victories allegorically symbolize the good omen for the realization of national unity, in addition to recalling the military and cultural achievements of the Roman era.	Edoardo Rubino (the left one)	
Winged Victory	These are two bronze statues depicting a winged Victory soaring on a base decorated with naval rams. The Winged Victories allegorically symbolize the good omen for the realization of national unity, in addition to recalling the military and cultural achievements of the Roman era.	Edoardo De Albertis (the right one)	

=== The terrace of the Altar of the Fatherland ===
At the end of the entrance staircase, immediately after the statues of the Winged Victories, is the terrace of the Altar of the Fatherland, the first elevated platform of the Vittoriano, which is centrally dominated by the statue of the goddess Roma and the shrine of the Unknown Soldier. Also on the terrace of the Altar of the Fatherland are the sculptural groups made of Botticino marble that symbolize the moral values of Italians, that is, the ideal principles that give strength to the nation.

The four groups are 6 meters high and are located to the right and left of the entrance to the terrace of the Altar of the Fatherland (two on each side), to the side of the statues of The Thought and The Action, and at the fountains of the two seas, along the parapets overlooking Piazza Venezia. This is no accident: the concepts expressed by these four sculptural groups, The Strength, The Concord, The Sacrifice, and The Law, are the tangible emanation of The Thought and The Action.

Work	Description	Author	Image
The Strength	It is located to the left of the parapet above the Adriatic fountain. The sculptural group consists of a young Roman centurion overlooking a medieval crossbowman (a time when Italy was divided into multiple states: instead, during the Roman era, the peninsula was under a single banner, that of Rome) and a worker holding a pickaxe displaying a pensive pose. The concept of "strength" is expressed by the muscular mass of the Roman centurion, who is imposing and has a Michelangelo-like stance (thus mighty and majestic), and by the overall shape of the sculptural group, which is triangular and angular.	Augusto Rivalta	
The Concord	It is located to the right of the parapet above the fountain of the Adriatic Sea. The sculptural group consists of a central figure, The Concord in the form of a woman with a cornucopia, who acts as a peacemaker accompanying the embrace between a Roman senator, representing The Principality, i.e., the Savoy monarchy, and a young man, who instead symbolizes The People, i.e., the Italian people. Another figure present is The Family in the form of a woman holding a child symbolizing the birth of the new state. Overall, the sculptural group allegorically communicates the birth of the Kingdom of Italy as an understanding between the Savoy monarchy and the Italian people.	Lodovico Pogliaghi	
The Sacrifice	It is located to the left of the parapet above the Tyrrhenian fountain. The sculptural group consists of four figures with a dying young fighter in the center who is supported by a man wearing broken slave chains on his wrists, symbolizing the regaining of freedom and dignity, which were obtained thanks to the warrior's sacrifice: the latter concept is communicated by another figure, the Genius of Liberty, who is leaning toward the fighter in the act of kissing him. Completing the sculptural group is a woman who impersonates The Family: women, during the Risorgimento period, were in fact seen as one of the most important examples of sacrifice, which was directed toward family and children. The sculptural group The Sacrifice is related to the previous sculpture The Strength, since the latter is essential to have the spiritual energy necessary to make sacrifices.	Leonardo Bistolfi	
The Law	It is located to the right of the parapet above the Tyrrhenian fountain. The sculptural group consists of four figures. In the center is The Liberty sheathing her sword after defeating The Tyranny, which is lying on the ground and leaving the scene to The Law. The latter turns his gaze toward The Tyranny communicating the fact that he is also its guarantor despite the despotic regimes' rejection of him. In the background, behind The Liberty and The Law, is The People, who are supported in their struggle for the national cause by the first two.	Ettore Ximenes	

=== The gates leading to the interior spaces ===
On either side of the Altar of the Fatherland the staircase resumes by dividing into two ramps symmetrical and parallel to the tomb of the Unknown Soldier. Both reach a pronaos where two large portals stand (one on each side, both positioned symmetrically and laterally to the Unknown Soldier and each at one of the two propylaea) leading to the interior spaces of the Vittoriano.

Above each doorway are two statues: on the left doorway The Politics and The Philosophy, and on the right doorway The War and The Revolution:

Work	Description	Author	Image
The Politics	This concept is allegorically rendered as a seated woman who turns her gaze to the left, toward the other statue located on the same doorway, The Philosophy. She holds a globe, a book, and a sword that points toward the ground: the latter two symbolize the strength, universality, and elevation of politics that later inspired the American Revolution, the French Revolution, and the Italian Risorgimento.	Nicola Cantalamessa Papotti	
The Philosophy	Philosophy is metaphorically represented by a woman with a pensive attitude with her right hand resting on her chin and her head lowered. The woman is bare-breasted to symbolize freedom of thought, a concept also rendered by the presence of flaps placed on her hairstyle.	Eugenio Maccagnani	
The War	War is allegorically rendered as a woman dressed as an ancient Roman holding an unsheathed sword while metaphorically defending freedom, a concept dear to the Enlightenment.	Ettore Ferrari	
The Revolution	The Revolution is metaphorically represented by a half-naked woman in the act of standing up. In her right hand she wields an axe, while on her head she wears a Phrygian cap, the symbol of the French Revolution. Her attitude is threatening and aggressive.	Ettore Ferrari	

=== The terrace of the equestrian statue of Victor Emmanuel II ===
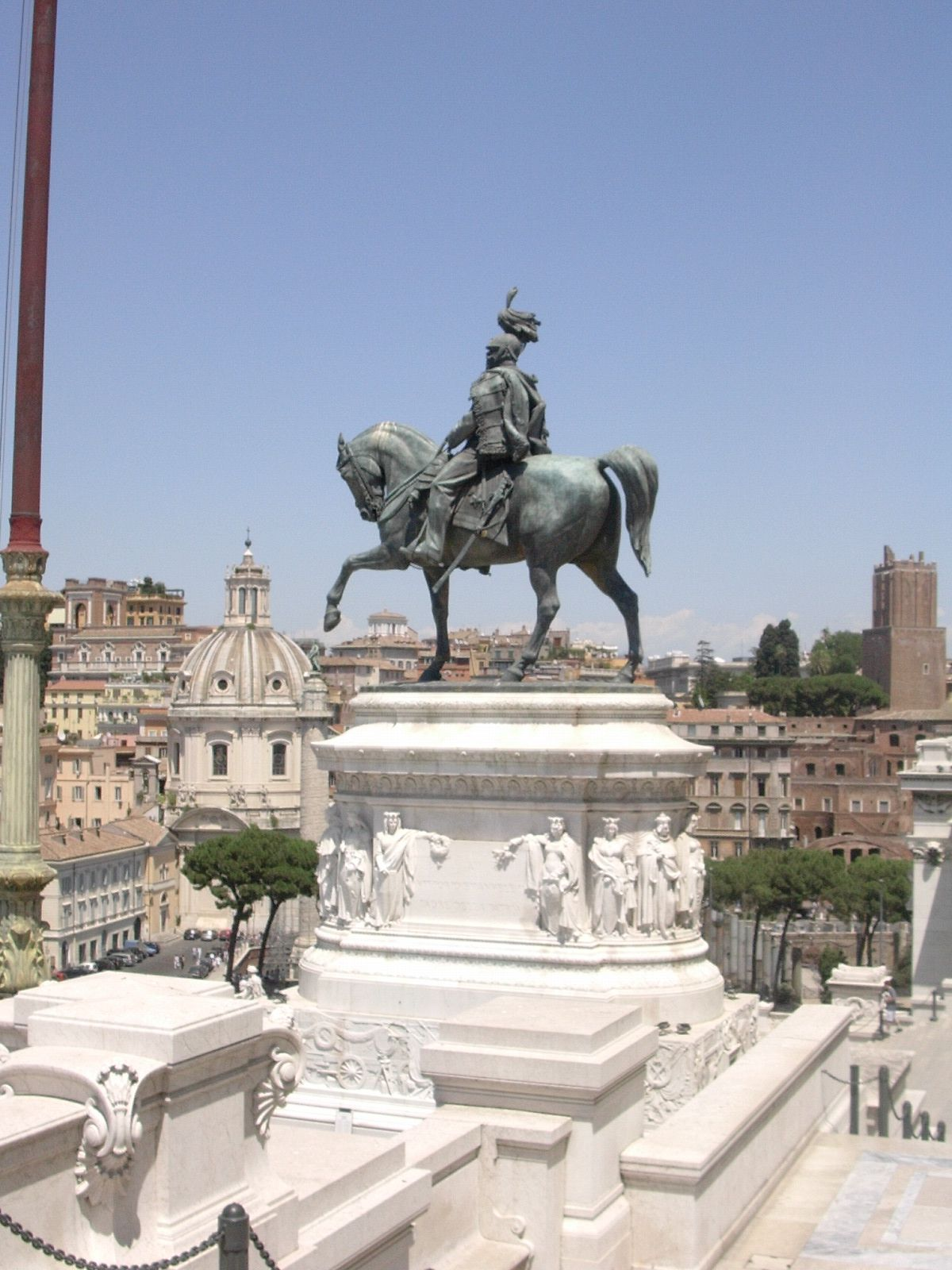
Victor Emmanuel II's equestrian statue, on whose marble base are carved statues of noble cities

From the two platforms where the gates giving access to the interior spaces open, two further flights of stairs depart, converging, exactly behind the Altar of the Fatherland, toward the base of the equestrian statue of Victor Emmanuel II: the latter is located on the second large raised platform, in order of height, of the Vittoriano. Behind the statue the staircase resumes its ascent in the direction of the sommoportico, arriving at a small terrace, from which two flights of steps depart laterally, each leading to the entrance of a propylaeum. Before reaching the entrances to the propylaea each of the two stairways breaks off, creating a small intermediate terrace shelf that provides access to the Terrace of the Redeemed Cities, the Vittoriano's third large and last elevated platform, which is located exactly behind the equestrian statue of Victor Emmanuel II and immediately below the colonnade of the sommoportico.

=== The terrace of the redeemed cities ===
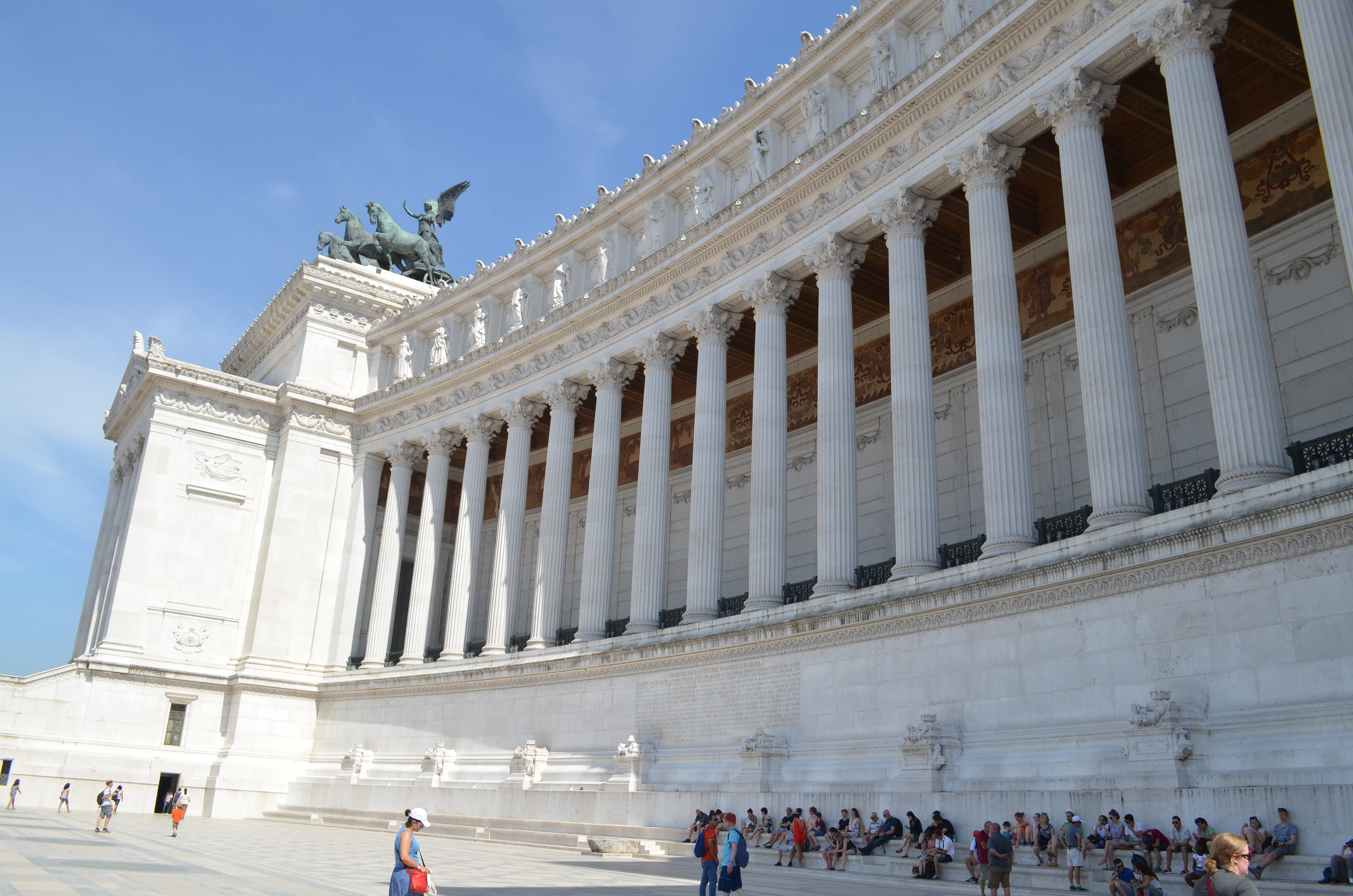
Overview of the terrace of the redeemed cities

The redeemed cities are those united with Italy following the Treaty of Rapallo (1920) and the Treaty of Rome (1924), peace agreements at the conclusion of World War I: these municipalities are Trieste, Trento, Gorizia, Pula, Rijeka, and Zadar.

Following the Treaties of Paris (1947), peace agreements signed by the nations participating in World War II, Pula, Rijeka and Zadar passed to Yugoslavia and - after the dissolution of the latter - to Croatia. After World War II, the territory of Gorica was divided: most of the city remained with Italy, while a small portion passed first to Yugoslavia and then to Slovenia, developing over time into the new city of Nova Gorica.

Each redeemed town is represented by an altar leaning against the back wall that bears the corresponding municipal coat of arms carved into it. The six altars were placed on the terrace between 1929 and 1930.

In detail, the description of the altars is as follows:

City	Description	Image
Trieste	These are six altars bearing the names of as many redeemed cities, which are surmounted by the respective municipal coat of arms.	
Trento	These are six altars bearing the names of as many redeemed cities, which are surmounted by the respective municipal coat of arms.	
Gorizia	These are six altars bearing the names of as many redeemed cities, which are surmounted by the respective municipal coat of arms.	
Pula	These are six altars bearing the names of as many redeemed cities, which are surmounted by the respective municipal coat of arms.	
Zadar	These are six altars bearing the names of as many redeemed cities, which are surmounted by the respective municipal coat of arms.	
Rijeka	These are six altars bearing the names of as many redeemed cities, which are surmounted by the respective municipal coat of arms.	

In the center of the row of altars of the redeemed cities, engraved on the stylobate, i.e., on the vertical wall on which the colonnade of the sommoportico rests, is a monumental inscription carved on the occasion of the solemn burial ceremony of the Unknown Soldier (November 4, 1921), which bears the text of the Victory Bulletin, an official document written after the Armistice of Villa Giusti with which General Armando Diaz, supreme commander of the Royal Army, announced, on November 4, 1918, the surrender of the Austro-Hungarian Empire and Italy's victory in World War I.

At the base of the text of the Victory Bulletin are two other altars similar to those of the redeemed cities but having, instead of the coat of arms of the municipalities, a helmet:

Work	Description	Image
Altars of the Victory Bulletin	These two altars bear the inscription, "Et Facere Fortia" (left altar of the inscription) "Et Pati Fortia" (right altar) echoing the Latin phrase Et facere et pati fortia romanum est (Livy, History of Rome, 11: in Livy's work the phrase is uttered by Mucius Scaevola against Porsenna), that is, "It is the attribute of a Roman to perform as well as to suffer mighty things."	

The monumental inscription bearing the Victory Bulletin reads:

His Majesty King Victor Emmanuel III of Savoy

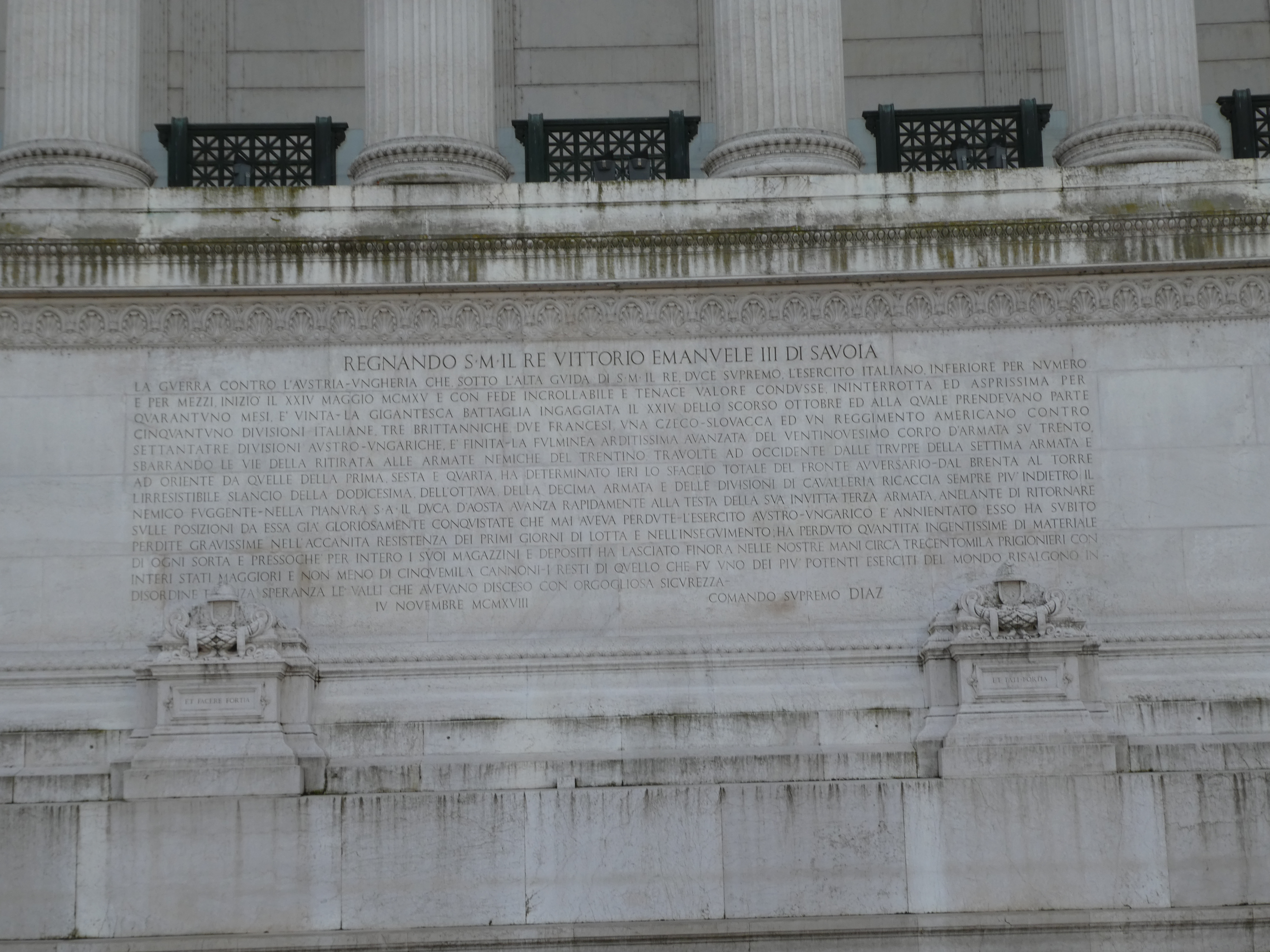
The text of the Victory Bulletin carved on the marble and the two altars bearing the inscription "Et Facere Fortia" (left) "Et Pati Fortia" (right) echoing the Latin phrase Et facere et pati fortia romanum est, or "It is the attribute of a Roman to perform as well as to suffer mighty things."

The war against the Austro-Hungarian Empire, which began on 24 May 1915 under the high command of H.M. the King, Supreme Duce, and which the Italian Army, inferior in numbers and resources, waged with unshakable faith and tenacious courage for 41 months, was won. The gigantic battle of 24 October, in which fifty-one Italian, three British, two French, one Czechoslovakian and one American regimental divisions took part against seventy-three Austro-Hungarian divisions, is over. The rapid and daring advance of the XXIXth Army Corps on the Trent, cutting off the retreat routes to the enemy armies in Trentino, overwhelmed to the west by the troops of the VIIth Army and to the east by those of the I, VI and IV, led yesterday to the total collapse of the opposing front. From the Brenta to the Torre, the irresistible momentum of the 12th, 8th, 10th Armies and the cavalry divisions drove the fleeing enemy further and further back. On the plain, His Highness the Duke of Aosta, at the head of his invincible III Army, advanced rapidly, longing to return to the victorious positions he had already conquered and which he had never lost. The Austro-Hungarian Army was crushed: it had suffered heavy losses in the fierce resistance of the first days, and in the pursuit it had lost very large quantities of material of all kinds and almost all its stores and depots. It has so far left in our hands about three hundred thousand prisoners with their entire staffs and no less than five thousand guns. The remnants of what was once one of the mightiest armies in the world are ascending in disorder and without hope the valleys from which they had descended with proud confidence.

November IV, MCMXVIII, Commander in Chief Diaz

Similarly, the Bulletin of Naval Victory was signed by Admiral Paolo Thaon di Revel, supreme commander of the Royal Navy. On the other hand, no similar bulletin was drafted for the air forces, since the latter at that time still reported to the Servizio Aeronautico, a department of the Royal Army: the Regia Aeronautica, the third armed force of the Kingdom of Italy, was in fact established only in 1923, after the end of World War I.

The terrace of the redeemed cities also features a boulder from the Grappa Massif, for a year the scene of the Italian front in World War I, to represent all the places where Italian soldiers fought during this conflict.

== The Altar of the Fatherland ==
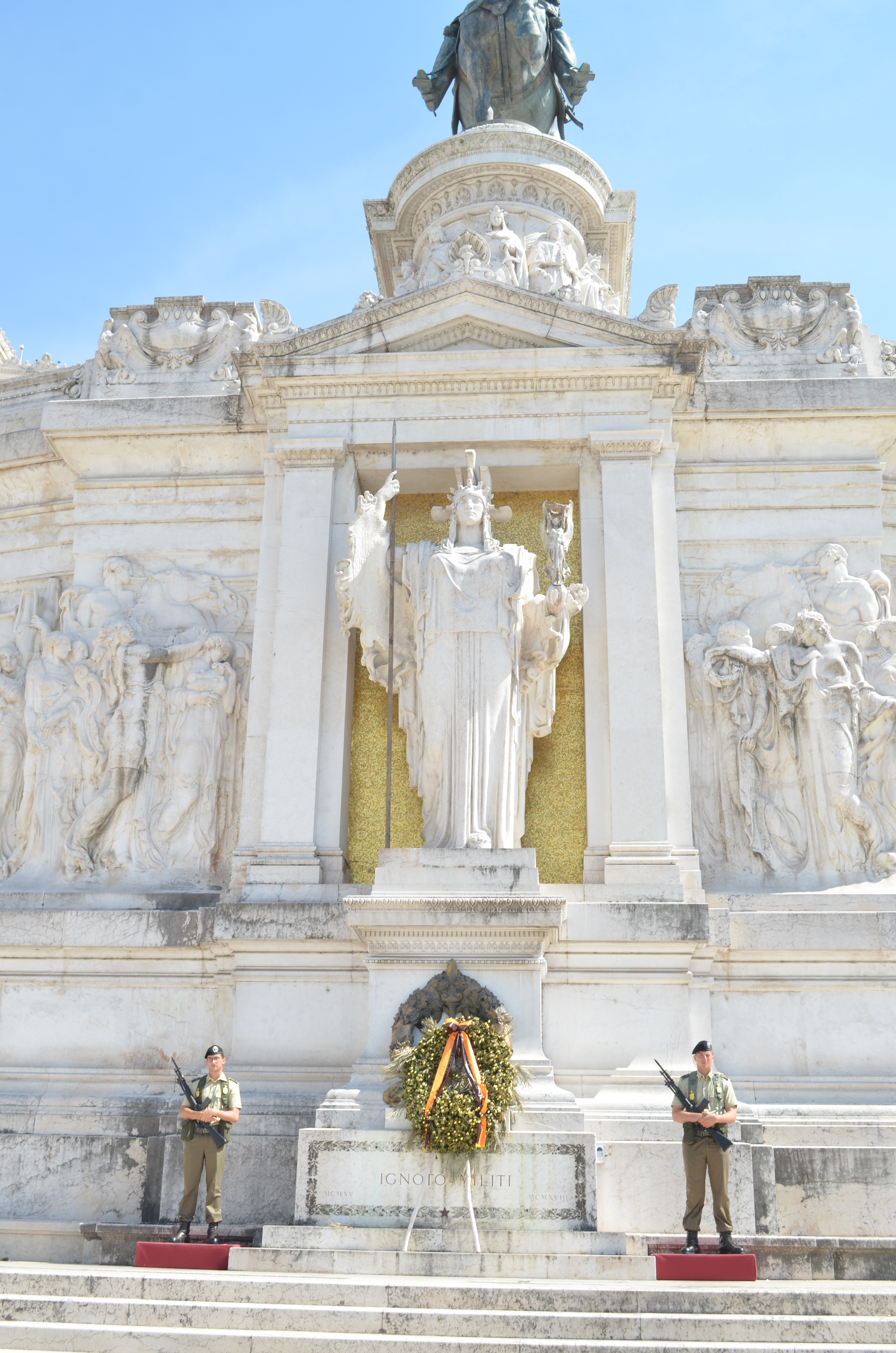
Altar of the Fatherland at the Vittoriano, with the guard of honor of the Unknown Soldier surmounted by the statue of the goddess Roma. Higher up one can recognize the lower part of the equestrian statue of Victor Emmanuel II. To the left and right of the statue of the goddess Roma can be seen bas-reliefs inspired by Virgil's Bucolics and Georgics

The Altar of the Fatherland is the most famous part of the Vittoriano and is the one with which the whole monument is often identified.

Located at the top of the entrance staircase, it was designed by Brescian sculptor Angelo Zanelli, who won a competition specially held in 1906. It consists of three elements: the side of the Tomb of the Unknown Soldier facing outward (while the side facing inward is located in a crypt), the aedicule of the goddess Roma (whose statue is located exactly above the Tomb of the Unknown Soldier), and two side marble reliefs.

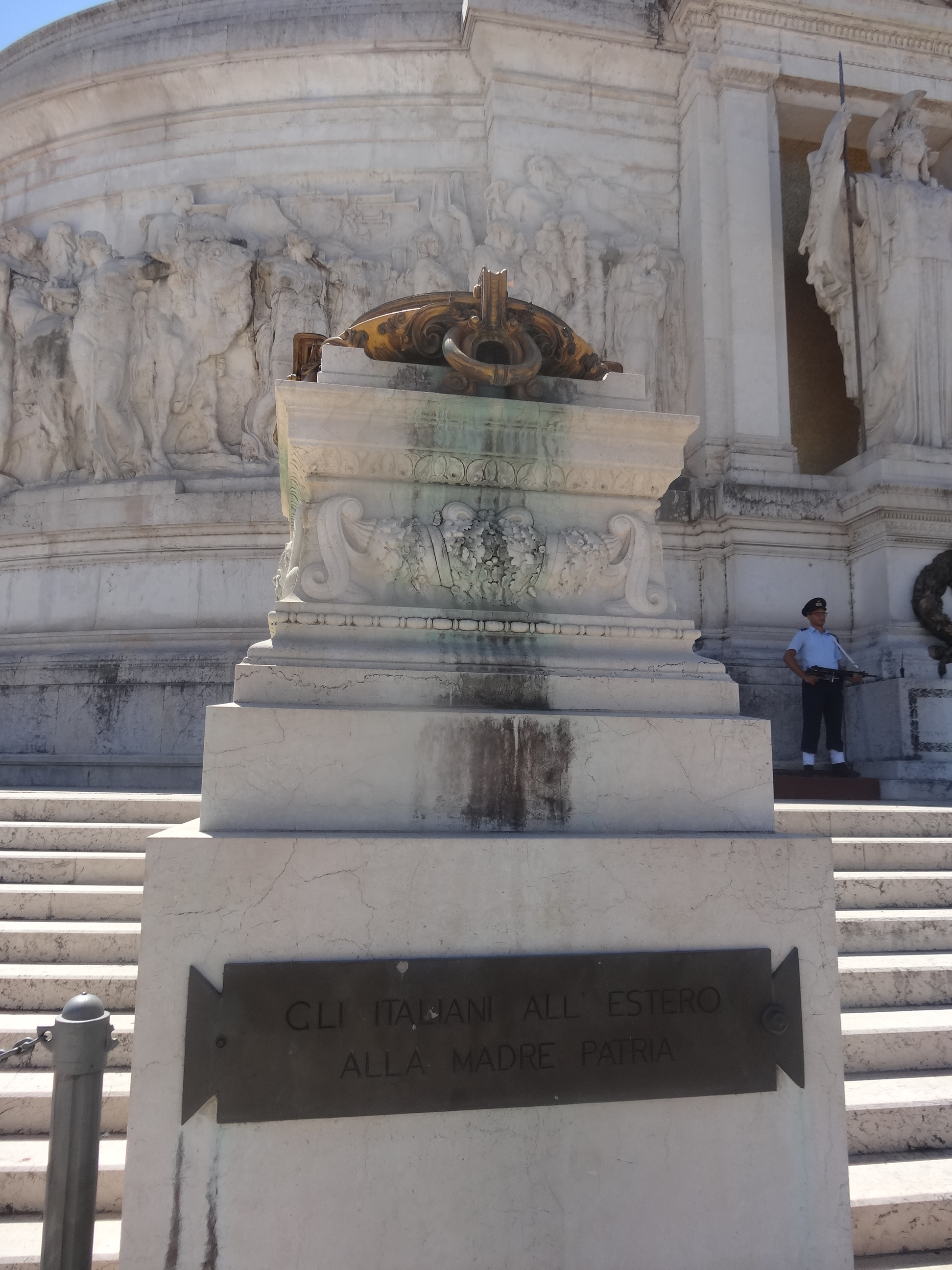
One of the two braziers that burn perpetually on either side of the Tomb of the Unknown Soldier. At their base is a plaque reading "Italians Abroad to the Motherland."

The statue of the goddess Roma present at the Vittoriano interrupted a custom in vogue until the 19th century that wanted its representation with exclusively warlike features: Zanelli decided to further characterize the statue by also providing a reference to Athena, the Greek goddess of wisdom and the arts as well as of war. The large statue of the goddess emerges from a golden background. The presence in the Vittoriano of the goddess Roma is meant to reiterate the thought of the Risorgimento patriots: the Eternal City is the one and only inalienable capital of Italy, and the whole history of Italy converges toward this idea.

The Unknown Soldier, an Italian soldier who died in World War I whose identity remains unknown, was transferred to the Altar of the Fatherland on November 4, 1921. The epigraph on his tombstone bears the Latin inscription "Ignoto Militi" and the years of the beginning and end of Italian participation in World War I, namely "Mcmxv" (1915) and "Mcmxviii" (1918). His tomb is a shrine symbolically representing all the fallen and missing in the war. The side of the Tomb of the Unknown Soldier facing outward at the Altar of the Fatherland is always guarded by an honor guard and two flames perpetually burning on braziers. The guard is provided by servicemen from the various arms of the Italian armed forces, who originally took turns every ten years, while later they took turns according to a schedule established from year to year.

The perpetually burning flames are a very ancient symbol, which has its origins in classical antiquity and especially in the cult of the dead: they represent the memory that remains alive despite the passage of time. In this case they thus symbolize the sacrifice of the Unknown Soldier and his imperishable memory in Italians. This is also true in those who are far from their country: not by chance, on the two perennial braziers is placed a plaque whose text reads "Italians abroad to the Motherland" in memory of the donations made by Italian emigrants in the late 19th and early 20th centuries.

The detailed description of the statue of the goddess Roma is as follows:

Work	Description	Author	Image
Goddess Roma	The statue represents the goddess Roma dressed in a peplos and a goatskin cloak. On her head is a helmet and a crown embellished with wolf heads. In her right hand she holds a spear while in her left hand she holds a statuette of Winged Victory. From an allegorical point of view, the statue, with its features reminiscent of the Greek goddess Athena, is related to the other sculptures of the Vittoriano, The Thought and The Action, located at the entrance of the monument. Athena is in fact the goddess of wisdom, the arts and war.	Angelo Zanelli	

The general conception of the bas-reliefs located laterally to the statue of the goddess Roma, one on her left and the other on her right, recalls Virgil's Bucolics and Georgics, which complete with the statue of the Roman deity the triptych of the Altar of the Fatherland. The allegorical meaning of the bas-reliefs is related to the desire to represent the Italian soul through sculpture. In fact, in the Georgics there is a reference to the Aeneid, which tells the legendary story of Aeneas, progenitor of the Roman people, while in both works the industriousness in work of the ancient Italians is evoked.

The bas-relief to the left of the Altar depicts the Triumph of Labor and converges scenographically toward the goddess Roma: with the following allegories (from left to right)

Work	Description	Author	Image
Agriculture	Concept represented by three figures: Breeding, Reaping, Harvesting and Irrigation	Angelo Zanelli	
Winged Genius of Labor	Represented by a figure climbing a large triumphal plow.	Angelo Zanelli	
Industry	Represented by a beam from which hangs a heavy anvil, on which a female hand lays an oak crown, a symbol of strength.	Angelo Zanelli	

The second bas-relief, to the right of the statue of the goddess Roma, symbolizes the Triumph of Love of the Fatherland and also converges scenically toward the statue of the Roman deity. It consists of the following allegories (from left to right):

Work	Description	Author	Image
Female figures bearing honorary crowns to Roma	These are three figures followed by the labara and legionary insignia.	Angelo Zanelli	
Genius of Fatherland Love and the Hero	The Hero, whose cloak is raised by two female figures, leans on the great sword of the Titans; both figures stand on a triumphal chariot.	Angelo Zanelli	
Brazier of the Sacred Fire of the Fatherland	Depicts a brazier hanging from a beam, an element also present symmetrically in the procession of the Triumph of Labor.	Angelo Zanelli	

The Tomb of the Unknown Soldier is the scene of official ceremonies during the celebrations of the Anniversary of the Liberation of Italy (April 25), Italian Republic Day (June 2) and National Unity and Armed Forces Day (November 4), occasions when the President of the Italian Republic and the highest offices of state pay solemn homage to it.

== The equestrian statue of Victor Emmanuel II ==
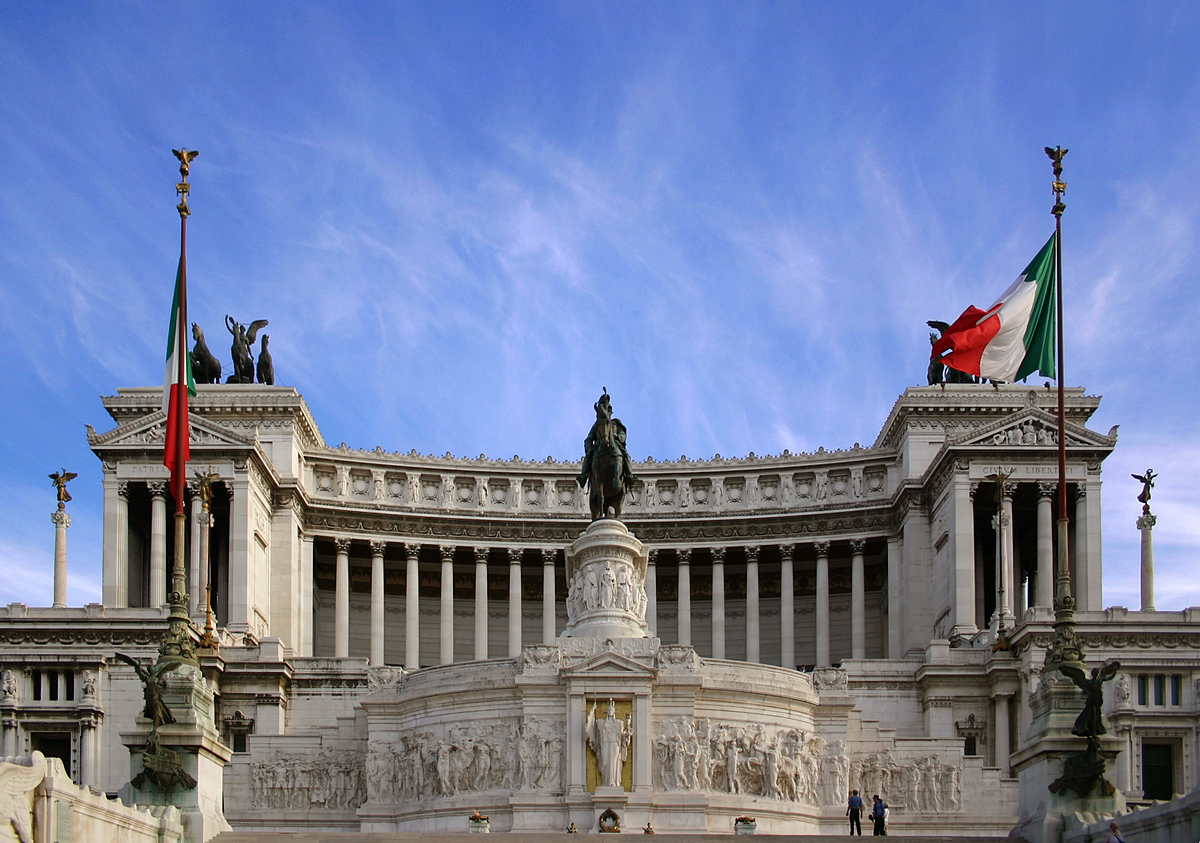
The equestrian statue of Victor Emmanuel II, which stands at the architectural center of the Vittoriano, above the Altar of the Fatherland

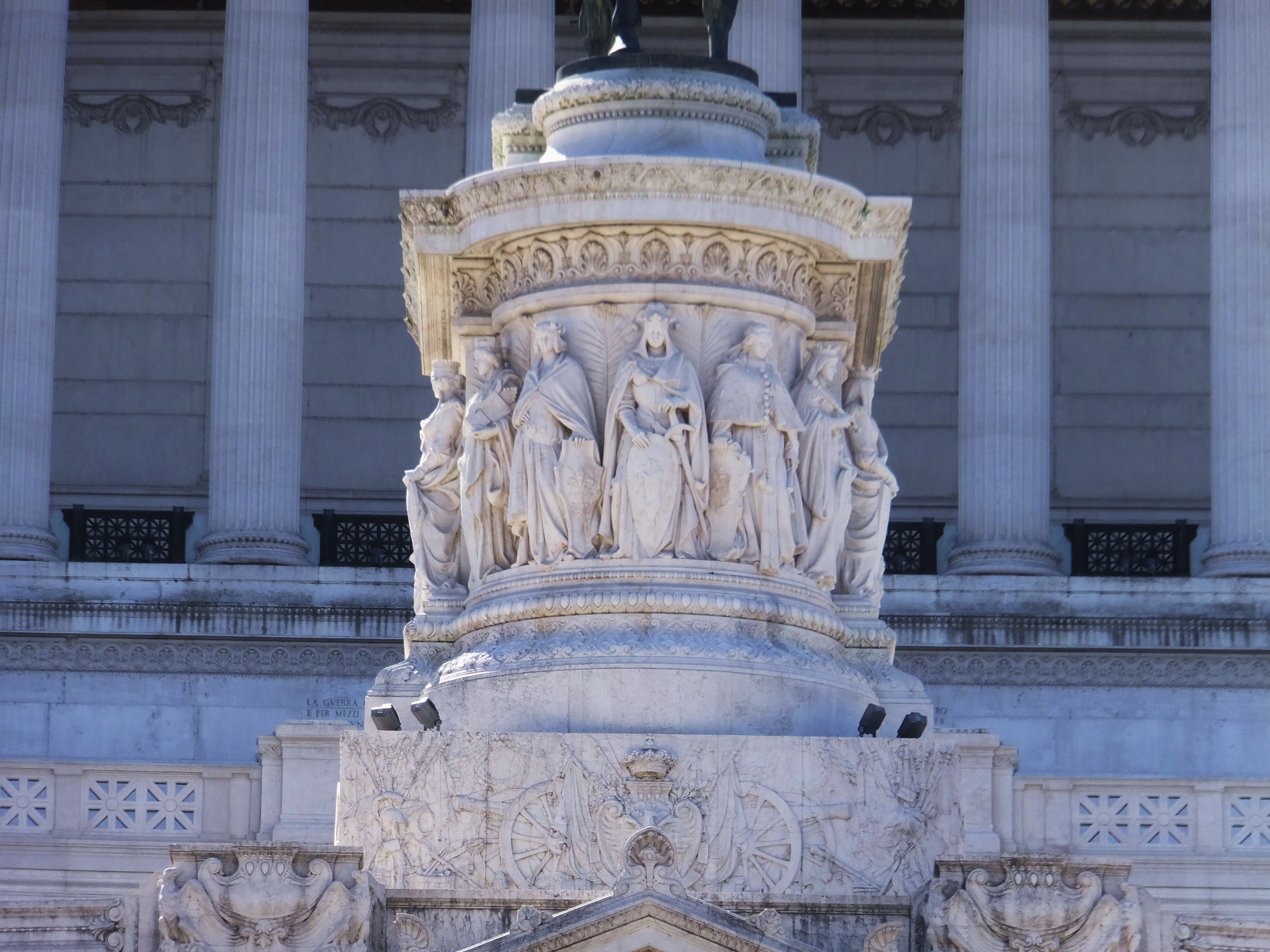
The base of the statue, with allegories of the noble cities

After passing the Altar of the Fatherland and continuing up the staircase, one encounters the equestrian statue of Victor Emmanuel II, a bronze work by Enrico Chiaradia and the architectural centerpiece of the Vittoriano. It is a bronze equestrian statue, 12 meters high and 10 meters long, weighing 50 tons; counting also the marble plinth, the entire sculptural group is 24.80 meters high.

== The statues of the noble cities ==
On the base of the equestrian statue of Victor Emmanuel II, as already mentioned, are allegorical sculptures representing fourteen noble cities, that is, capitals of pre-unification noble states, historically converging toward the Kingdom of Italy and the Savoy dynasty, as it embraced the cause of the Risorgimento. Therefore, these are not necessarily the most important cities of Italy, but those considered its "noble mothers."

The fourteen statues of the noble cities are placed at the base of the equestrian statue to Victor Emmanuel II because metaphorically they are the foundations of Italy, and, in a broader sense, the unity of the Fatherland is based on the union of its municipalities.

In contrast to those representing the regions of Italy, the statues depicting the fourteen cities are all the work of the same sculptor, Eugenio Maccagnani. Each city is identifiable by its coat of arms and the symbols historically associated with it.

The list below begins with the statue placed on the front of the plinth and continues counterclockwise.

City and coat of arms represented	Noble state	Description	Author	Image
Turin senza_cornice (Coat of arms of Turin)	1563-1847: capital of the Duchy of Savoy; 1847-1861: capital of the Kingdom of Sardinia	The warlike tradition of the city is symbolized by the armor; the statue is located in front, in the center of the plinth, as the first capital of united Italy and the birthplace of Victor Emmanuel II; on the coat of arms is the heraldic bull	Eugenio Maccagnani	
Venice senza_cornice (Coat of arms of Venice)	697-1797: capital of the Duchy of Venice, then Republic of Venice	It bears the crown and robes of the Doges of Venice; in its coat of arms the lion of St. Mark is in molèca, that is, in the position of the crab	Eugenio Maccagnani	
Palermo senza_cornice (Coat of arms of Palermo)	1130-1816: capital of the Kingdom of Sicily	The snake around the arm is one of the city's oldest symbols; on the shield is the city's other symbol: the eagle	Eugenio Maccagnani	
Mantua senza_cornice (Coat of arms of Mantua)	1433-1530: capital of the Marquisate of Mantua; 1530-1708: capital of the Duchy of Mantua	It wears the ducal crown and crowns the plaque with the inscription "Victor Emmanuel II Father of the Fatherland" with oak; in the cross shield is depicted the profile of Virgil	Eugenio Maccagnani	
Plaque with the inscription "Victor Emmanuel II Father of the Fatherland"				
Urbino senza_cornice (Coat of arms of Urbino)	1213-1443: capital of the County of Urbino; 1443-1630: capital of the Duchy of Urbino	It lays a laurel branch on the plaque inscribed "Victor Emmanuel II Father of the Fatherland." It wears the ducal crown and Renaissance clothing to commemorate the golden age of the Marche city, home of Raphael Sanzio and Bramante	Eugenio Maccagnani	
Naples senza_cornice (Coat of arms of Naples)	598-1137: capital of the Duchy of Naples; 1302-1816: capital of the Kingdom of Naples; 1816-1861: capital of the Kingdom of the Two Sicilies	It wears the necklace of dignity and a royal robe that recalls the role of capital that the city had for centuries	Eugenio Maccagnani	
Genoa senza_cornice (Coat of Arms of Genoa)	1097-1797: capital of the Republic of Genoa	In its hand it holds the caduceus of Mercury, symbolizing commerce, and wears the dress of the Doges of Genoa	Eugenio Maccagnani	
Milan senza_cornice senza_cornice (Coat of arms of Milan)	286-402: capital of the Western Roman Empire; 1259-1395: capital of the Seignory of Milan; 1395-1797: capital of the Duchy of Milan	The shield features the biscione, symbol of the Visconti, and the municipal cross, which is linked to the Carroccio	Eugenio Maccagnani	
Bologna senza_cornice (Coat of Arms of Bologna)	The city is represented here because its very ancient university is the source of law on which the power of the noble states is based	It bears the doctoral crown and the codes of law that recall the University of Bologna, the oldest in the Western world.	Eugenio Maccagnani	
Ravenna senza_cornice (Coat of arms of Ravenna)	402-476: capital of the Western Roman Empire; 493-540: capital of the Ostrogothic Kingdom of Italy; 584-751: capital of the Byzantine Exarchate of Italy	It carries a pine branch in its hand to commemorate the famous Classe pine forest and wears the typical Byzantine royal robes of the Exarchate of Italy	Eugenio Maccagnani	
Pisa senza_cornice (Coat of arms of Pisa)	1000-1406: capital of the Republic of Pisa	It wears the Phrygian cap and rests a laurel branch on the plaque with the inscription "By Law of May 16, 1878"	Eugenio Maccagnani	
Plaque with the inscription "By law of May 16, 1878"				
Amalfi senza_cornice (Coat of arms of Amalfi)	839-1131: capital of the Duchy of Amalfi	It leans a palm leaf on the plaque with the inscription "By law of May 16, 1878"; the coat of arms depicts the compass, which Amalfi navigators spread throughout Europe	Eugenio Maccagnani	
Ferrara senza_cornice (Coat of arms of Ferrara)	1208-1471: capital of the Seignory of Ferrara; 1471-1598: capital of the Duchy of Ferrara	The lyre, sacred to Apollo, represents the cultured court of the Este family, which hosted Torquato Tasso and Ludovico Ariosto	Eugenio Maccagnani	
Florence senza_cornice (Coat of arms of Florence)	1532-1569: capital of the Duchy of Florence; 1569-1859: capital of the Grand Duchy of Tuscany	It is crowned with the laurel like Dante Alighieri, and its appearance is reminiscent of Beatrice; on the coat of arms is the Florentine lily	Eugenio Maccagnani	

== The sommoportico and propylaea ==
=== General features ===
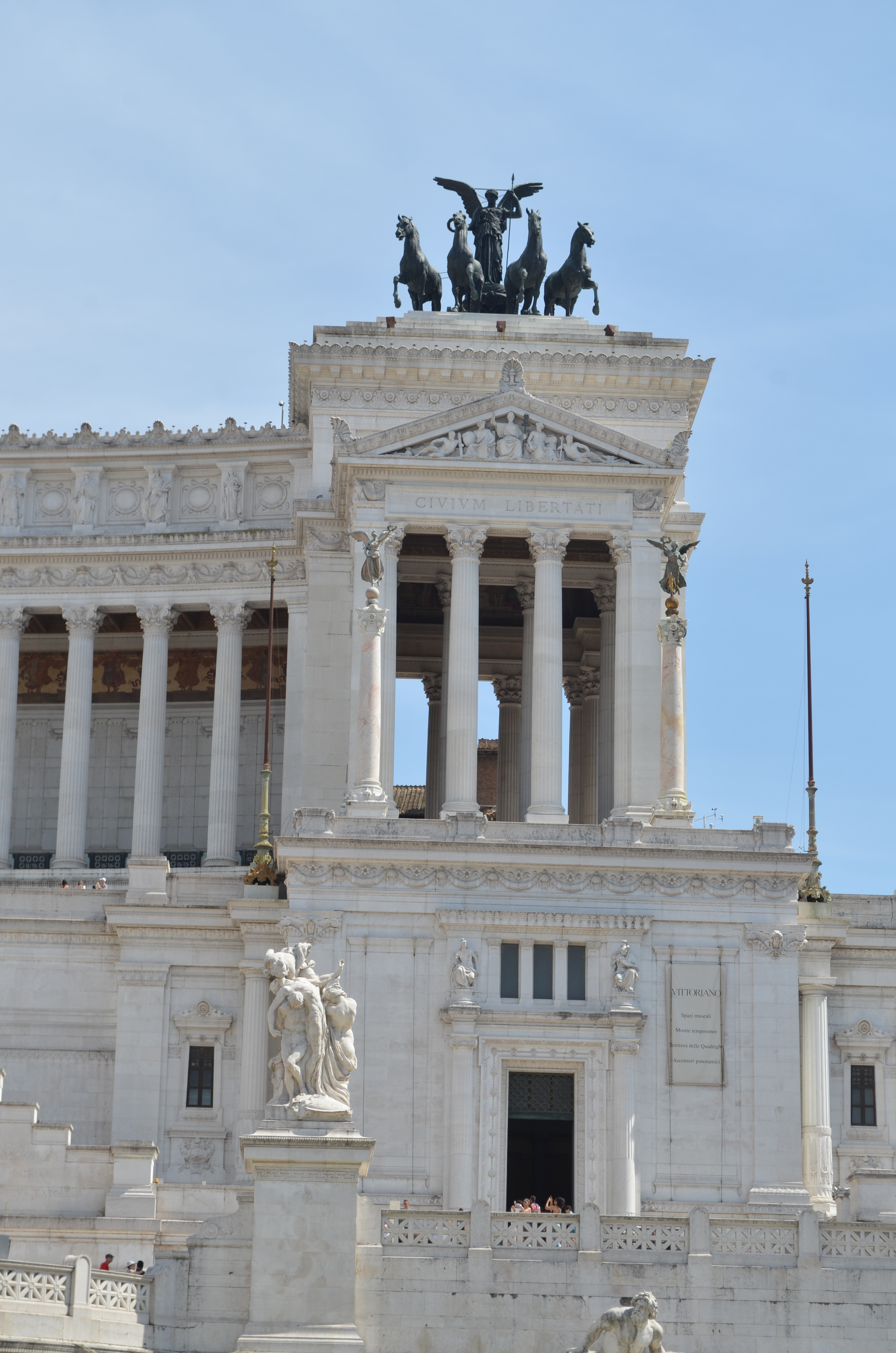
The right propylaeum of the Vittoriano, the one dedicated to the freedom of citizens. Below the propylaeum one can recognize one of the two gates leading to the interior spaces of the Vittoriano

Continuing up the staircase past the equestrian statue of Victor Emmanuel II, one arrives at the most architecturally impressive and conspicuous element of the entire complex: the large portico with Corinthian-style columns, slightly curved, located at the top of the monument and therefore called the "sommoportico." At its ends are two propylaea, protruding from the sommoportico, of which they constitute the entrances.

The sommoportico is 72 meters long and consists of sixteen 15-meter-high columns, topped by capitals embellished with the face of turreted Italy (located in the center) and acanthus leaves. On the frieze of the cornice are sixteen statues, allegorical personifications of the Italian regions: each statue is located at a column. For the columns of the sommoportico, Giuseppe Sacconi was inspired by those of the Temple of the Dioscuri, located in the nearby Roman Forum.

Each propylaeum is crowned by a bronze sculptural group depicting a winged Victory on a quadriga. This is reminiscent of the expressive forms of ancient Roman triumphal arches: indeed, the allegorical meaning of the quadriga, since antiquity, has been that of triumph and victory. This concept is reinforced by the presence of the winged Victories, whose meaning is related to the metaphorical communication of victory in battle through a divine message, which is allegorically delivered to the victor by winged Victories gliding from the sky.

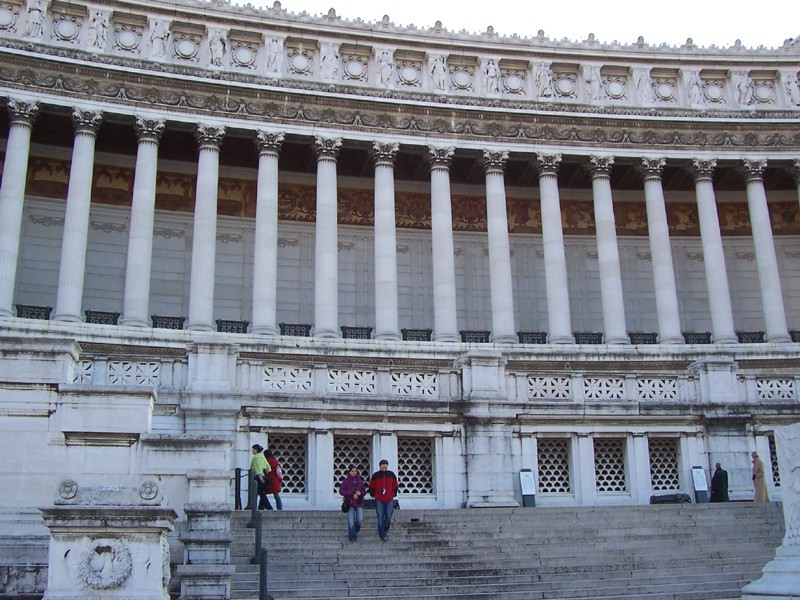
Detail of the colonnade of the sommoportico

The two quadrigas, as the Latin inscriptions placed on the pediments of the propylaea below explicitly state, symbolize the freedom of citizens ("Civium Libertati," on the right propylaeum) and the unity of the fatherland ("Patriae Unitati," on the left propylaeum), the two concepts allegorically linked to the entire monument as a symbol of "free and united Italy." The presence of winged Victories on the chariots metaphorically communicates that Italy, having won unity and freedom, is ready to spread a new Renaissance in the world, supported by the moral virtues allegorically represented in the Vittoriano.

The concepts of "freedom of citizens" and "unity of the fatherland" also summarize the fundamental themes that characterized the beginning and the end of Victor Emmanuel II's contribution to the Risorgimento. The beginning was the proclamation of Moncalieri (Nov. 20, 1849), with which the king, who had ascended the throne a few months before, confirmed the survival of the liberal regime (thus linked to the concept of "freedom of citizens") in a period marked by widespread conservatism that was a consequence of the violent repression of the 1848 uprisings. On the other hand, his political work had a happy conclusion with the capture of Rome (September 20, 1870), with which the sovereign concluded his objectives: a united Italy (which, however, still lacked Trentino, Alto Adige and Venezia Giulia, united to Italy only following the victory in World War I, which for this reason was considered by some to be the "fourth Italian war of independence") with Rome as capital (expressing the concept of "unity of the fatherland").

The quadrigas, already planned in the original design, were built and placed in 1927. Inside the pediments of the two propylaea are sculptural groups that have the same theme as the respective quadrigas above them.

In 2000, on the occasion of the opening ceremony of the school year, held at the Vittoriano, President of the Republic Carlo Azeglio Ciampi said about the inscriptions on the propylaea: "All the 'souls' of the Risorgimento found themselves united in the two inscriptions that we see up there at the top of the two propylaea: 'To the Unity of the Homeland; To the Freedom of the Citizens. It is a beautiful combination: republican Italy, with the Constitution of '48, confirmed it as its foundation."

Below is the description in detail of the quadrigas:

Work	Description	Author	Image
Quadrigas with winged victory of citizens' freedom	Bronze statue representing a quadriga led by a winged Victory. Placed on the right propylaeum, it metaphorically symbolizes the freedom of citizens.	Paolo Bartolini	
Quadriga with winged Victory of the unity of the homeland	Bronze statue representing a quadriga led by a winged Victory. Placed on the left propylaeum, it metaphorically symbolizes the unity of the homeland.	Carlo Fontana	

Inside the pediments of the two propylaea are sculptural groups that have the same theme as the respective quadriga above:

Work	Description	Author	Image
Freedom of Citizens	Bas-relief of the right propylaeum consisting of five figures, including a central one, toward which the other four rotate, allegorically representing the freedom of citizens. On the lintel is the inscription Civium Libertati ("to the freedom of citizens").	Emilio Gallori	
Unity of the Fatherland	Bas-relief of the left propylaeum consisting of five figures, including a central one, toward which the other four rotate, allegorically representing the unity of the fatherland. On the lintel is the inscription Patriae Unitati ("to the unity of the fatherland").	Enrico Butti	

=== The statues of the regions ===
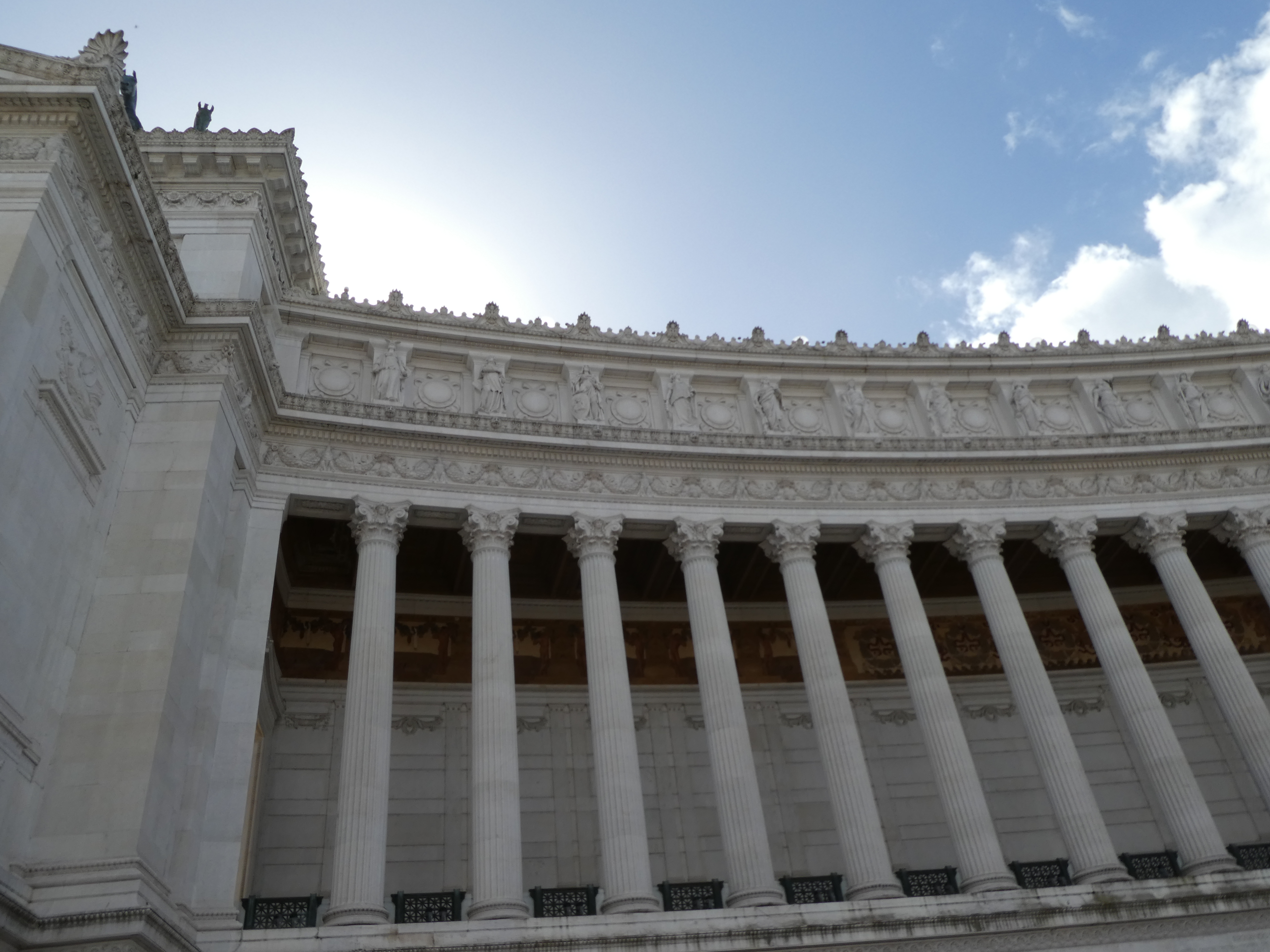
Detail of the colonnade of the sommoportico, on whose upper cornice, at each column, statues of the Italian regions were carved

The staircase leading to the terrace of the redeemed cities is the best vantage point for the statues of the regions of Italy, which are located on the frieze of the sommoportico, each corresponding to a column. The presence of statues metaphorically portraying the regions of Italy draws inspiration from the personifications of the Roman provinces, often placed on celebratory monuments during the imperial era; as an example, suffice it to think of the reliefs of Hadrian's temple in Piazza di Pietra. For the typology of the frieze, which is very tall and has statues alternating with clipei, Sacconi was inspired by that of the portico of the nearby Forum of Trajan. Each statue is five meters high and was entrusted to a different sculptor, almost always a native of the region whose image he would carve. The cornice is also embellished with eagles and lion heads.

The number of statues placed on the cornice of the sommoportico is sixteen: in fact, at the time of the drafting of the project, as many Italian regions were identified, which, moreover, had simple geographical significance: the region as an administrative entity was implemented only with the Republican constitution. (Note: See the article on Italian regionalism and the sources cited therein.)

Since the time when the Vittoriano was built, the criteria for identifying Italian regions, and sometimes even their names, have changed over the decades.

- Valle d'Aosta and Piedmont are represented by a single statue, since they formed a single entity; Valle d'Aosta as a region was not established until 1948.
- The Triveneto was represented as a single region, since Trentino, Alto Adige, and Venezia Giulia would only be united with Italy following victory in World War I.
- Abruzzo and Molise were conceived as one region (Abruzzi e Molise) and would remain so until 1963.
- Emilia-Romagna was called simply Emilia, while Basilicata was called Lucania.

In 2000, on the occasion of the opening ceremony of the school year, held at the Vittoriano, President of the Republic Carlo Azeglio Ciampi said about the statues of the regions and noble cities: "Those who wanted this monument thought of it as being dedicated to the whole of Italy, because Italy is made up of its hundred cities, its regions, its provinces, and its municipalities."

From left to right, the statues of the Italian regions are as follows:

Map (Note: The state and local boundaries depicted are those in effect at the time of Vittoriano's construction, unchanged in the fifty years between the capture of Rome and Italy's victory in World War I.)	Region	Description	Author	Image
bordo	Piedmont (Note: Modern Piedmont and Aosta Valley.)	The statue represents the current regions of Piedmont and Aosta Valley. It is depicted with armor, gladius, and a helmet crowned with an eagle to represent the key role played in the wars of independence and the Risorgimento.	Pier Enrico Astorri	
bordo	Lombardy	She is depicted with the Iron Crown on her head, symbol of the Lombard Kingdom, while she is about to unsheathe her sword: this is to recall both Mediolanum, the capital of the Western Roman Empire, and the medieval Italic Kingdom, the anticipation of the new Kingdom of Italy for which the Lombards fought hard.	Emilio Bisi	
bordo	Triveneto (Note: The modern Veneto, Trentino-Alto Adige, and Friuli-Venezia Giulia.)	The statue represents the Triveneto, or the three modern regions of Veneto, Trentino-Alto Adige, and Friuli-Venezia Giulia. At the time the Vittoriano was built, in fact, only Veneto and most of Friuli were already Italian, while Trentino, Alto Adige, Venezia Giulia, and a small part of Friuli were part of the Austro-Hungarian Empire. The statue wears the clothes of the Doge and carries the shield with the Lion of St. Mark and the scepter of the Most Serene Republic. It commemorates the seafaring power of Venice and the glorious pages of Risorgimento history written by all the people of northeastern Italy	Paolo Bartolini	
bordo	Liguria	The statue bears the ducal crown and at its side is the rammed prow of a ship, symbolizing the seafaring power of Genoa and the enterprising and adventurous spirit of the Ligurians, most notably Christopher Columbus	Antonio Orazio Quinzio	
bordo	Emilia (Note: Modern Emilia-Romagna.)	The statue represents the current region of Emilia-Romagna. The statue wears on its head the Phrygian cap, a symbol of the love of freedom; the inscription "Libertas" placed on the shield recalls the Liber Paradisus, by which in 1256 the Municipality of Bologna abolished slavery. On the other hand, the book with the inscription BONONONIA ALMA MATER STUDIORUM and the fasces (Note: This symbolism associated with the University of Bologna, which dates back to the Middle Ages, has no relation to fascism.) are symbols of the University of Bologna, the oldest in the Western world	Mauro Benini	
bordo	Tuscany	The statue of this region is crowned with laurel as Dante Alighieri, to commemorate the famous Florentine poet, the father of the Italian language. The torch symbolizes Tuscan culture, which brought light to the whole of Europe, especially during the Renaissance. The shield with the lion of Florence (called the Marzocco) recalls the courage of Tuscan patriots	Italo Griselli	
bordo	Marche	With its left hand it holds a lyre, sacred to Apollo god of the arts, as a reminder that Marche is a land of beloved poets, painters, and musicians such as Leopardi, Raphael, Rossini, Pergolesi, and Bramante. The right hand rests on a ship's rudder, to recall the adventurous fishermen of the Marche and the ancient seafaring power of Ancona	Giuseppe Tonnini	
bordo	Umbria	The statue features a sword, a veiled head like the priests of the classical age, and a tilted patera in the gesture of libation, to recall the mystical spirit of Umbria and the great saints of this region who enlightened Italy and Europe. In fact, the patron saint of Italy, St. Francis of Assisi, St. Clare of Assisi and the patron saint of Europe, St. Benedict of Nursia, are Umbrian	Elmo Palazzi	
bordo	Lazio	The statue of Victory in hand symbolizes the responsibility of the region where Rome is located to preserve and protect the Unity of Italy with so many sacrifices achieved in the Risorgimento	Adolfo Pantaresi	
bordo	Abruzzi e Molise (Note: Later divided into two separate regions, Abruzzo and Molise.)	The statue represents the two current regions of Abruzzi and Molise. She is dressed in lion skin that also covers her head. She carries an oak branch in one hand and a walking stick in the other to represent the rugged nature of the beautiful mountains, the strong and gentle character of the inhabitants, and the ancient practice of transhumance	Silvio Sbricoli	
bordo	Campania	The statue bears a cornucopia filled with fruit, an ancient symbol of abundance and good fortune, to recall the ancient epithet Campania Felix, due to the fertility of the volcanic soil, and linked to the celebrated mildness of the climate, with blue skies and bright sunshine	Gaetano Chiaromonte	
bordo	Apulia	The statue has a simple dress and loose hair, holds out bunches of grapes, and leans on a plow. The whole is a reminder of the fertility of the Tavoliere and the entire Apulian soil, which supplies the other regions of Italy with grapes, wheat, and many other products	Francesco Pifferetti	
bordo	Lucania (Note: Modern Basilicata.)	The statue, representing present-day Basilicata, is dressed in a toga and clutches a sword and staff. This serves as a reminder of the strong and hardened character of the Lucanians and the ancient civilization of this land, dating back to Greek colonization and flourishing under the Roman Empire	Luigi Casadio	
bordo	Calabria	Clad in a wild animal skin, she holds a sword and shield of the goddess Athena. This is reminiscent of the Greek civilization that flourished on the Calabrian coast, but also of the wild appearance of the forests and mountains in its interior, within sight of the Ionian and Tyrrhenian seas	Giovanni Nicolini	
bordo	Sicily	The statue carries a bundle of wheat, to recall the fertility and richness of the Sicilian land; it also holds a shield with the ancient symbol of the Triskelion, an expression of the strength of this land and also of the abundance of fantastic myths and legends linked to it from the earliest times	Michele Tripisciano	
bordo	Sardinia	The statue carries the scepter and is depicted in the act of offering its crown, as a reminder that the battles that led to the unification and independence of Italy started from the Kingdom of Sardinia, and that so many Sardinians, from the very beginning, fought during the Risorgimento. The crown is generously held in the hand and not on the head as a reminder that the Kingdom of Italy was born from the Kingdom of Sardinia	Luigi Belli	

=== The interior spaces ===
The interior spaces of the sommoportico and propylaea are accessed by two triumphal entrance staircases located at each propylaeum. The two entrance staircases are located on a small terrace reached by a short flight of steps, which begins at the terrace of the redeemed cities. At the base of the entrance steps of the propylaea are four statues of winged Victories on triumphal columns: made in 1911, two are at the entrance to the right propylaeum and two at the entrance to the left propylaeum.

The description of the Winged Victories on triumphal columns is as follows:

Work	Description	Author	Image
Winged Victory with palm and serpent	Located in front of the left propylaeum, it is placed to the left of its entrance. The figure carries a palm and snake.	Nicola Cantalamessa Papotti	
Winged victory with sword	Located in front of the left propylaeum, it is placed to the right of its entrance. The figure carries a sword.	Adolfo Apolloni	
Winged Victory with laurel wreath	Located in front of the right propylaeum, it is placed to the left of its entrance. The figure wears a laurel wreath.	Mario Rutelli	
Winged Victory with laurel wreath	Located in front of the right propylaeum, it is placed to the right of its entrance. The figure wears a laurel wreath.	Arnaldo Zocchi	

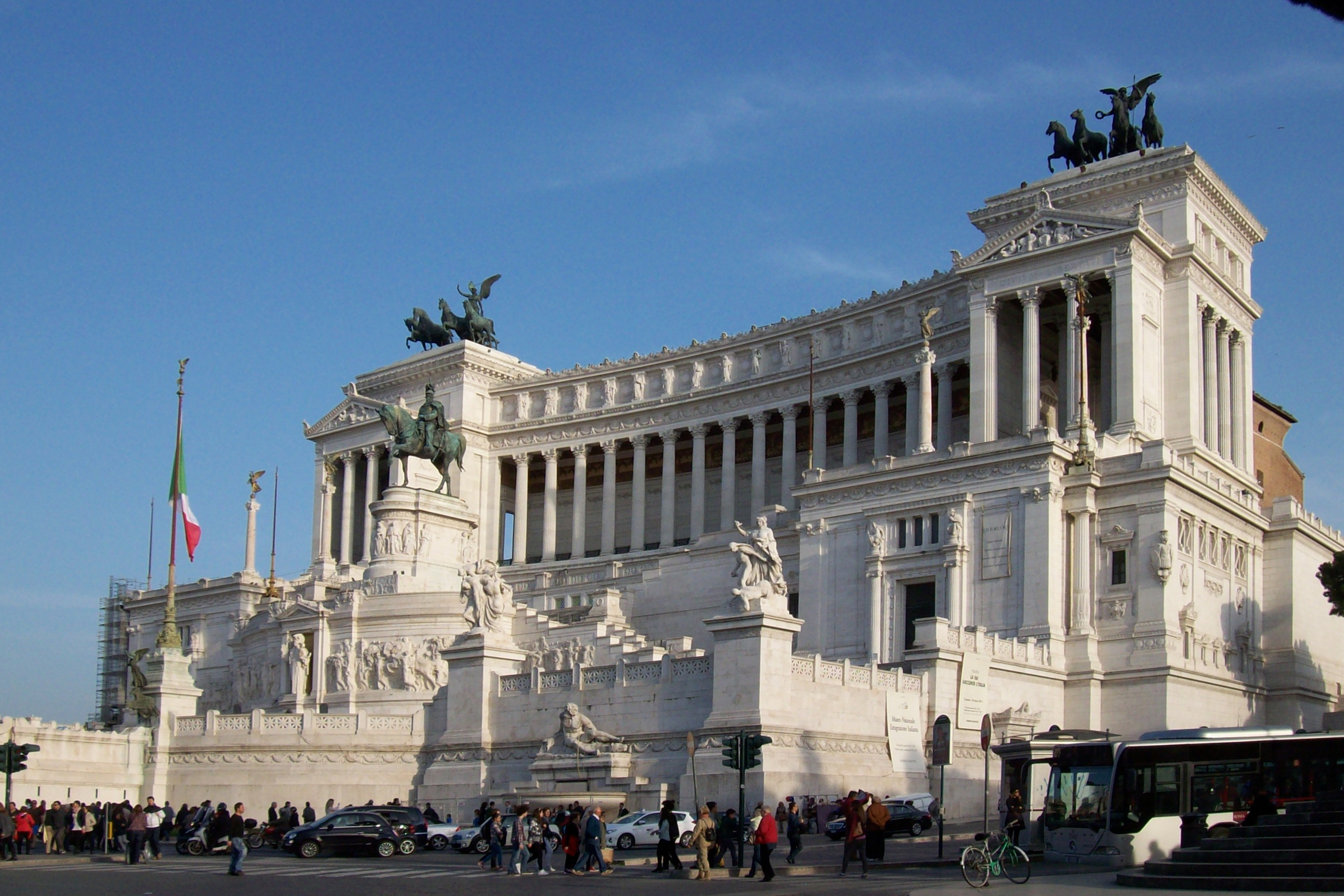
The Vittoriano, on top of which stand the sommoportico and the two propylaea, which are topped by as many statues of quadrigas

The entrance to each propylaeum leads to a large quadrangular vestibule, which opens onto a colonnade that offers a wide panoramic view of Rome. From the vestibules one enters the interior spaces of the sommoportico. The interiors of the propylaea and sommoportico are decorated with mosaics, important works of floral Art Nouveau and pictorial symbolism, which cover the lunettes and the two domes of the propylaea.

The mosaics of the interior spaces of the propylaea also have as their subject the metaphorical representation of the virtues and sentiments, very often rendered as allegorical personifications, that motivated the Italians during the Risorgimento. The interiors of the propylaea and the sommoportico are decorated with mosaics, important works of floral Art Nouveau and pictorial symbolism, which cover the lunettes and the two domes of the propylaea. The interiors of the sommoportico are decorated with allegories of the sciences, while the doors connecting the propylaea and the sommoportico are embellished with depictions about the arts.

The decoration of the ceiling of the left propylaeum was entrusted to Giulio Bargellini. In these mosaics he adopted innovative technical devices, such as the use of various materials and tesserae of different sizes and inclined in such a way as to create elaborate light reflections. Also noteworthy is how the lines of the mosaic representations continue toward those of the columns below.

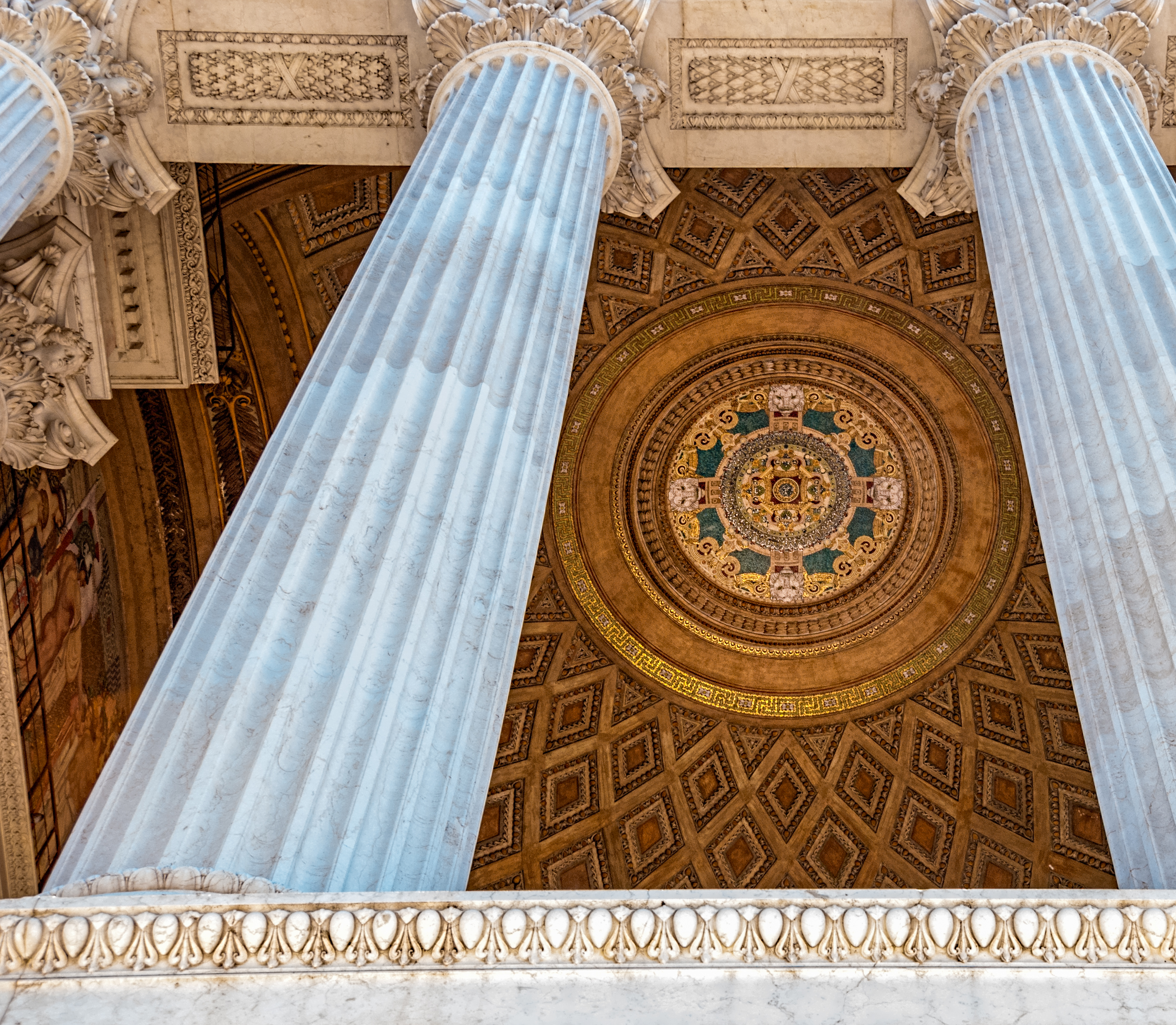
Glimpse of the interior ceiling decorations of one of the two propylaea

Bargellini's mosaics along the highest part of the walls figuratively represent: Faith (allegorically rendered with the consecration of children to the homeland by the people; in the background is a city reminiscent of Jerusalem), Strength (a warrior accompanying a young man to a meeting with a woman armed with a sword), Work (personified by a family of farmers gathering together after a day in the fields), and Wisdom (depicted with a teacher in a chair in front of his pupils seated on desks).

The decoration of the ceiling of the right propylaeum was instead entrusted to Antonio Rizzi. Along the highest part of the walls, Rizzi executed: The Law (a work composed of the allegories of Justice seated on the throne, Wisdom, Wealth, Prudence, Fortitude, and Temperance, each with its classical attributes), Valor (depicted with a young man tempering his sword on the wings of Liberty and who is surrounded by the founders of the Italic lineage, including Aeneas and Ascanius), Peace (a female figure holding a sheaf of wheat and by other figures bearing the fruits of the earth, while white doves fly toward a fountain of water) and The Union (depicted with a young man meeting The Poetry).

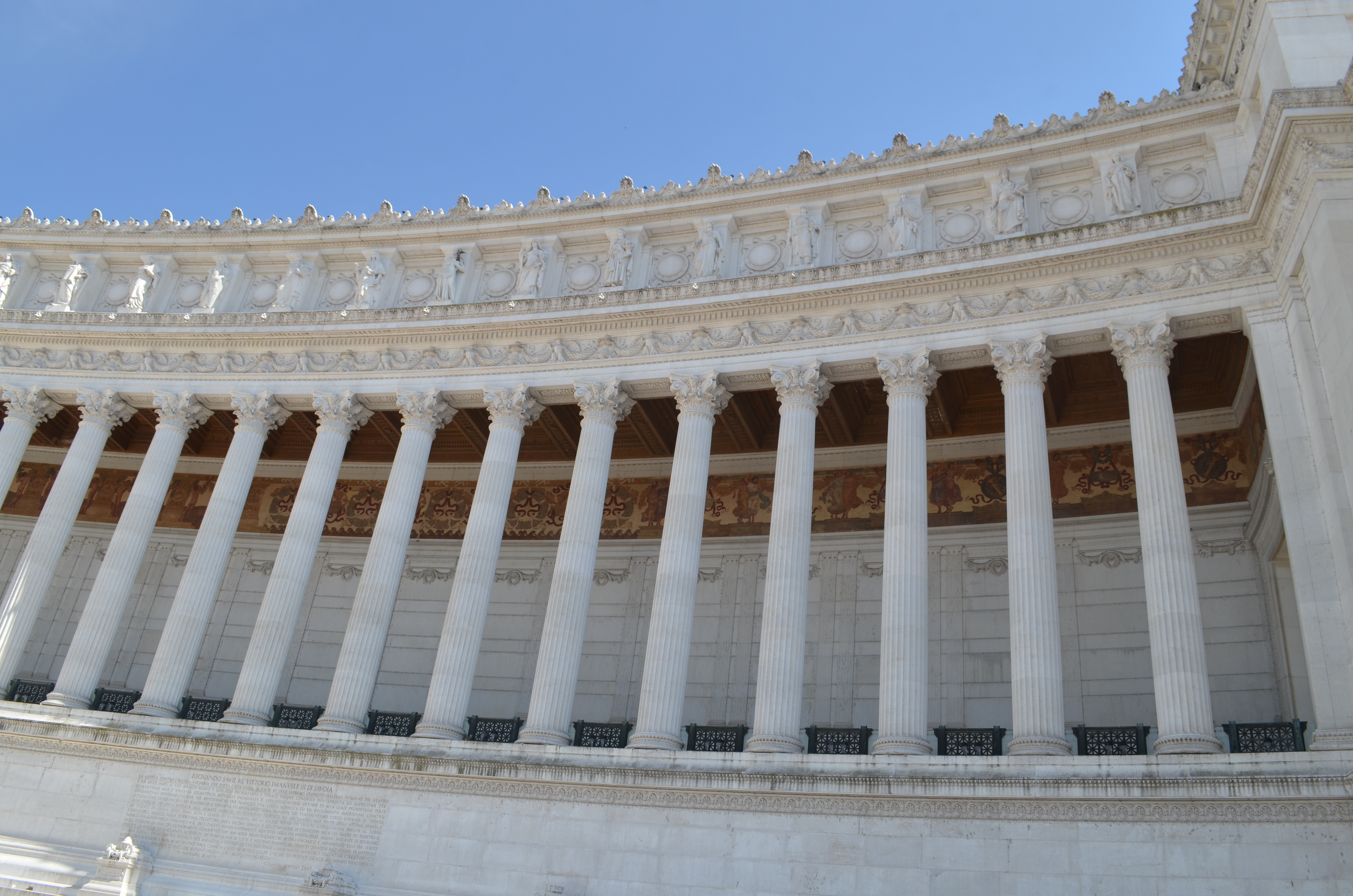
Glimpse of the interior decorations of the front wall at the colonnade of the sommoportico

The interior doors that lead from the two propylaea to the sommoportico are adorned with allegorical sculptures representing the arts: Architecture and Music, which are located in the left vestibule and are the work of Antonio Garella, and Painting and Sculpture, which are located in the right vestibule and were made by Lio Gangeri. The interior of the sommoportico has a floor of polychrome marbles and a coffered ceiling: the latter, which was designed by Gaetano Koch, is called the "ceiling of sciences."

The "ceiling of the sciences" owes its name to the bronze sculptures by Giuseppe Tonnini placed inside the sommoportico, which represent the Allegories of the Sciences and are all composed of female personifications: Geometry with a compass and a square, Chemistry with a retort and a distiller, Physics with a lantern and a barometer, Mineralogy with a quartz crystal, Mechanics with a cogwheel, Medicine with a cup and a rod of Asclepius, Astronomy with a globe of the zodiac and a sextant, and Geography with a protractor and a globe. The vertical wall opposite the columns is decorated, in the upper part, with gilded-bottom mosaics dating from after 1925. Other sculptures inside the sommoportico are the Trophies of Arms (consisting of a set of shields, cuirasses, halberds, spears, flags, arrows and quivers; in one trophy is shown the crown of Italy, the eagle with the cross shield and the collar of the Annunciation: the emblems of the House of Savoy.

== The inner crypt of the Unknown Soldier ==
The Crypt of the Unknown Soldier is a space located under the equestrian statue of Victor Emmanuel II, which is accessed from the Shrine of Flags. From the crypt, it is possible to see the side of the Tomb of the Unknown Soldier that faces the interior spaces of the Vittoriano. It is therefore located at the Altar of the Fatherland, from which, on the other hand, one can see the side of the tomb that faces the outside of the building.

The epigraph on the inner side of the tombstone bears the inscription "Ignoto Militi" and the dates of the beginning and end of Italian participation in World War I, namely "Xxiv Maggio Mcmxv" (May 24, 1915) and "Iv Novembre Mcmxviii" (November 4, 1918). As mentioned above, the outer side of the tombstone instead only bears the years of Italian participation in the war.

The Unknown Soldier, on November 1, 1921, was awarded the Gold Medal of Military Valor, Italy's highest military decoration, with a motivation that was also inscribed on the inner side of the shrine, in the crypt of the same name:

Worthy son of a valiant lineage and a millennial civilization, he stood unyielding in the most contested trenches, lavished his courage in the bloodiest battles and fell fighting with no other prize to hope for than victory and the greatness of the Fatherland.

On the door of the simulacrum, on the other hand, is the following epitaph, personally penned by King Victor Emmanuel III:

Unknown the name - his spirit dazzles - wherever Italy is - with a voice of weeping and pride - they say - innumerable mothers: - he is my son.

The Soldier was also awarded foreign honors. As early as October 12, 1921, he was bestowed the Medal of Honor, the highest military decoration awarded by the federal government of the United States of America. This was followed by the Cross of Liberty, the highest awardable by the government of Estonia, and the Croix de guerre, a French military honor.

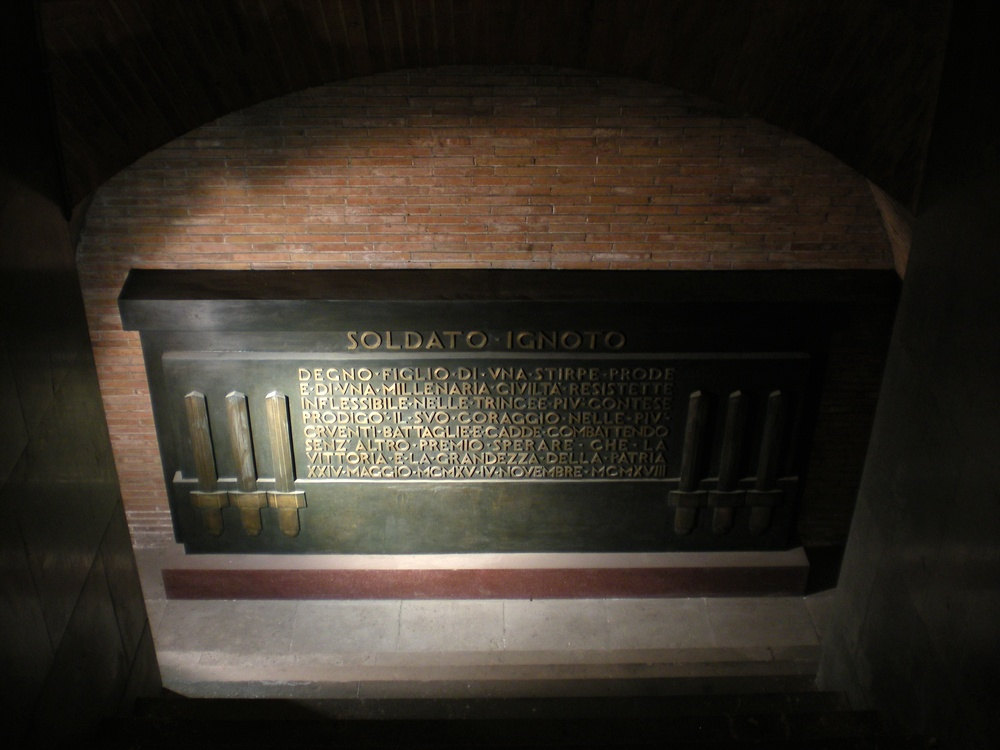
The shrine of the Unknown Soldier visible from the crypt inside the Vittoriano

The Crypt of the Unknown Soldier is the work of architect Armando Brasini. It is a room in the shape of a Greek cross with a domed vault accessed by two flights of stairs. From the crypt, a short tunnel departs that reaches the niche of the Sacellum of the Unknown Soldier. The niche is set in an arcosolium inspired by the style of early Christian buildings, especially the catacombs. The ceiling of the crypt recalls the style of Roman architecture, alternating rib and barrel vaults. The room, built of brick, is characterized by the presence of round arches and niches. There is also a small altar for religious services.

The walls of the crypt are decorated with a Byzantine-style mosaic of a religious nature by Giulio Bargellini. The crucifixion of Jesus is located above the tomb of the Unknown Soldier: on the walls, on the other hand, the patron saints of the Italian armed forces stand out: Saint Martin, patron of the infantry, Saint George for the cavalry, Saint Sebastian for the local police, and Saint Barbara for the navy, artillery and engineering. Finally, in the dome is Our Lady of Loreto, patron saint of the air force.

Parts of the crypt and tomb were made of stone materials from the mountains that were the scene of World War I clashes: the floor is made of Karst marble, while the small altar was made of a single block of stone from Mount Grappa.

== See also ==
- Ettore Ferrari
- Giuseppe Sacconi
- Pio Piacentini
- National symbols of Italy
- History of the Vittoriano
- Victor Emmanuel II

== Bibliography ==
- John Agnew (2005). The Impossible Capital: Monumental Rome under Liberal and Fascist Regimes, 1870-1943. Geografiska Annaler, Series B: Human Geography. Wiley Blackwell.
- Busico, Augusta (2005). Il tricolore: il simbolo la storia. Presidenza del Consiglio dei Ministri, Dipartimento per l'informazione e l'editoria.
- Maria Rosaria Coppola, Adriano Morabito e Marco Placidi (2005). Il Vittoriano nascosto. Ministero per i beni e le attività culturali.
- Spiro Kostof. The Third Rome 1870—1950: an Introduction.
- Levi, Primo (April 1904). "Il monumento dell'Unità Italiana". La Lettura. fascicolo IV. Corriere della Sera.
- Maiorino, Tarquinio; Giuseppe Marchetti Tricamo e Andrea Zagami (2002). Il tricolore degli italiani. Storia avventurosa della nostra bandiera. Milano: Arnoldo Mondadori Editore.
- Mariano, Fabio (2004). L'età dell'Eclettismo: arte e architettura nelle Marche fra Ottocento e Novecento. Nerbini. ISBN 9788888625201.
- Mola, Aldo Alessandro (2002). Storia della monarchia in Italia. Bompiani.
- Quarta, Roberto (2009). Roma massonica. Editoriale Olimpia. ISBN 978-88-272-2498-4.
- Maurizio Ridolfi, ed. (2003). Almanacco della Repubblica: storia d'Italia attraverso le tradizioni, le istituzioni e le simbologie repubblicane. Bruno Mondadori. ISBN 978-88-424-9499-7.
- Tobia, Bruno (2011). L'Altare della Patria. Il Mulino.
- Romano Ugolini, ed. (2011). Cento anni del Vittoriano 1911-2011. Atti della Giornata di studi. Gangemi Editore Spa. ISBN 978-88-492-7422-6.
