= Hazel Brill Jackson =

American sculptor (1894–1991)

- Born: December 15, 1894; Philadelphia, Pennsylvania, United States
- Died: May 17, 1991 (aged 96); Newburgh, New York, United States
- Education: School of the Museum of Fine Arts, Scuola Rosati
- Occupations: Sculptor, engraver, draftsperson
- Notable work: Ned (1934)
- Awards: Altman Prize (1945)

Hazel Brill Jackson (1894 – 1991) was an American sculptor. She was known for her bronze statues of animals, specifically horses and dogs. Jackson also worked in engraving and drawing.

== Early life and education ==
Hazel Brill Jackson was born on December 15, 1894, in Philadelphia, Pennsylvania. Her parents were Lizabeth Lee Stone and William Henry Jackson.

She attended classes at the School of the Museum of Fine Arts in Boston (now School of the Museum of Fine Arts at Tufts), and at Scuola Rosati in Florence, Italy. Jackson also studied under American sculptors Bela Pratt, and Charles Grafly, and in Rome, Italy under sculptor Angelo Zanelli.

== Career ==
While living in Rome she would visit the Bioparco di Roma zoo for inspiration. In 1934, she cast Benito Mussolini's horse Ned in bronze, for her work titled "Ned". She wasn't a supporter of Mussolini's politics, and she chose this specific horse after seeing him in a parade. It took her months to have permission to cast.

The Newburgh Free Library contains a bronze statue of a fox by Jackson. The Porter Memorial Library in Maine contains a bronze statue by Jackson of Ichabod Crane, the fictional character from The Legend of Sleepy Hollow.

Jackson was active in mountaineering and American and Italian alpine clubs for many years.

She received the Altman Prize in 1945, and the Ellen P. Speyer Memorial Prize in 1949, both awards from the National Academy of Design. She was elected in 1956 as an Associate of the National Academy of Design in New York City, and as an Academician in 1961.

In 1979, Jackson's art studio was destroyed in a fire.

== Death and legacy ==
She died on May 17, 1991 at 96 years old, in her home in Newburgh in Orange County, New York.

Her work can be found in public museum collections, including the Harvard Art Museums, and Springfield Museum of Fine Arts (now the Michele and Donald D'Amour Museum of Fine Arts).

== Exhibitions ==
- 1975, Women Artists in the Museum Collection, group exhibition, Springfield Museum of Fine Arts, Springfield, Massachusetts
- 1981, Modern Master in Bronze, solo exhibition, Museum of Fine Arts, Boston, Boston, Massachusetts
- 1981, Glorious Horsemen: Equestrian Art in Europe, 1500-1800, traveling group exhibition, Museum of Fine Arts, Boston, Boston, Massachusetts
- 1982, Bronze Works, group exhibition, Garrison Art Center, Garrison, New York
