= Coat of arms of Bologna =

Coat of arms

- Armiger: Matteo Lepore, Mayor of Bologna
- Adopted: 1937

The coat of arms of the Italian city of Bologna consisted of an oval shield divided into four parts, two containing a red cross on a white background (the city's arms), surmounted by a 'Capo d'Angiò' and two containing 'LIBERTAS' (liberty) in gold letters on a blue background (the people's arms). The whole coat of arms is surmounted by a lion's head.

== Blazon ==
The coat of arms, approved by decree of 6 November 1937, has the following blazon:

Scudo ovato inquartato: il primo e il quarto d'argento alla croce piana rossa, capo d'Angiò; il secondo e il terzo d'azzurro alla parola LIBERTAS d'oro posta in banda.

[Quartered oval shield: the first and fourth silver a red plain cross, head of Anjou; the second and third blue the word LIBERTAS gold in a band.]

== History ==
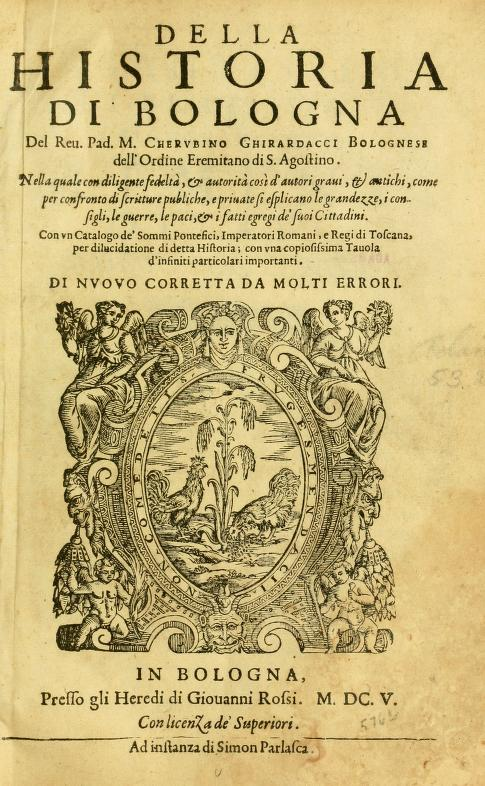
Frontispiece of Historia di Bologna

The coat of arms of Bologna is made up of three elements:

- The cross Gules on a field Argent, Arms of the commune
- The word LIBERTAS Or on a field Azure, Arms of the people
- The lion's head guardant

The first one to appear as the symbol of the commune was the red cross, its first account was a drawing that can be seen in the margin of a document dating back to 1259, regarding the banner of Bologna, while the first colored depiction is found in a 1311's codex by the Statuti dell'arte dei Drappieri. According to Cherubino Ghirardacci in his book Historia di Bologna, the red cross would have originated during the First Crusade when Lodovico Bianchetti gave a banner depicting the cross, an ensign used by the Bolognese crusaders, to Tartaro Tencarari, so that he could give it to the Magistrate of Bologna, who then decided to adopt it as the symbol of the city. Another tradition says that the coat of arms was adopted when bologna was a member of the Lombard League, but both of these hypothesis are often discarded as it's more likely that the cross was adopted as a symbol for the Bolognese militia and that it was later adopted as a symbol of the city as a whole.

Although a legend says that the Chief of Anjou was added to represent the fabled donation of the Oriflamme made by Charles VI of France to the city in 1389, the chief was actually added during the war between the Papacy and the Empire as a symbol of the city's allegiance to the Guelph's faction and to the Pope.

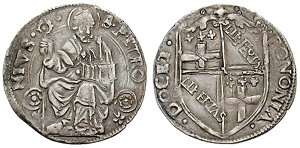
16th century coin depicting Saint Petronius and the coat of arms of the city

According to Ghirardacci, the second symbol of the city, the blue shield with the word LIBERTAS in gold, appeared around the same period in 1376, the year in which the Bolognese people rebelled against the rule of Cardinal Guglielmo di Noellet in the War of the Eight Saints, during which the city received military aid and a blue banner with the motto Libertas in gold from the Florentines.

The modern coat of arms started to appear on the Bolognese coins during the reign of Sante Bentivoglio, after which the blazon was changed by the other reigning families to include their coat of arms, but the changes never stuck to the emblem.

The final symbol, the lion's head, started to appear in the 15th century probably as a nod to the emblem adopted by the supporters of the rebellion of 1376, which was a lion holding a crusader banner, however the modern coat of arms only depicts the head as the symbol was adopted after the city lost their independence to the Papal States.

== Bibliography ==
- Giorgio Cencetti, Lo stemma di Bologna, in Il Comune di Bologna, n. 5, Bologna, maggio 1937.
- Luciano Artusi, Firenze araldica, Firenze, Polistampa, 2006, ISBN 88-596-0149-5.
