= Angelo Zanelli =

Italian sculptor

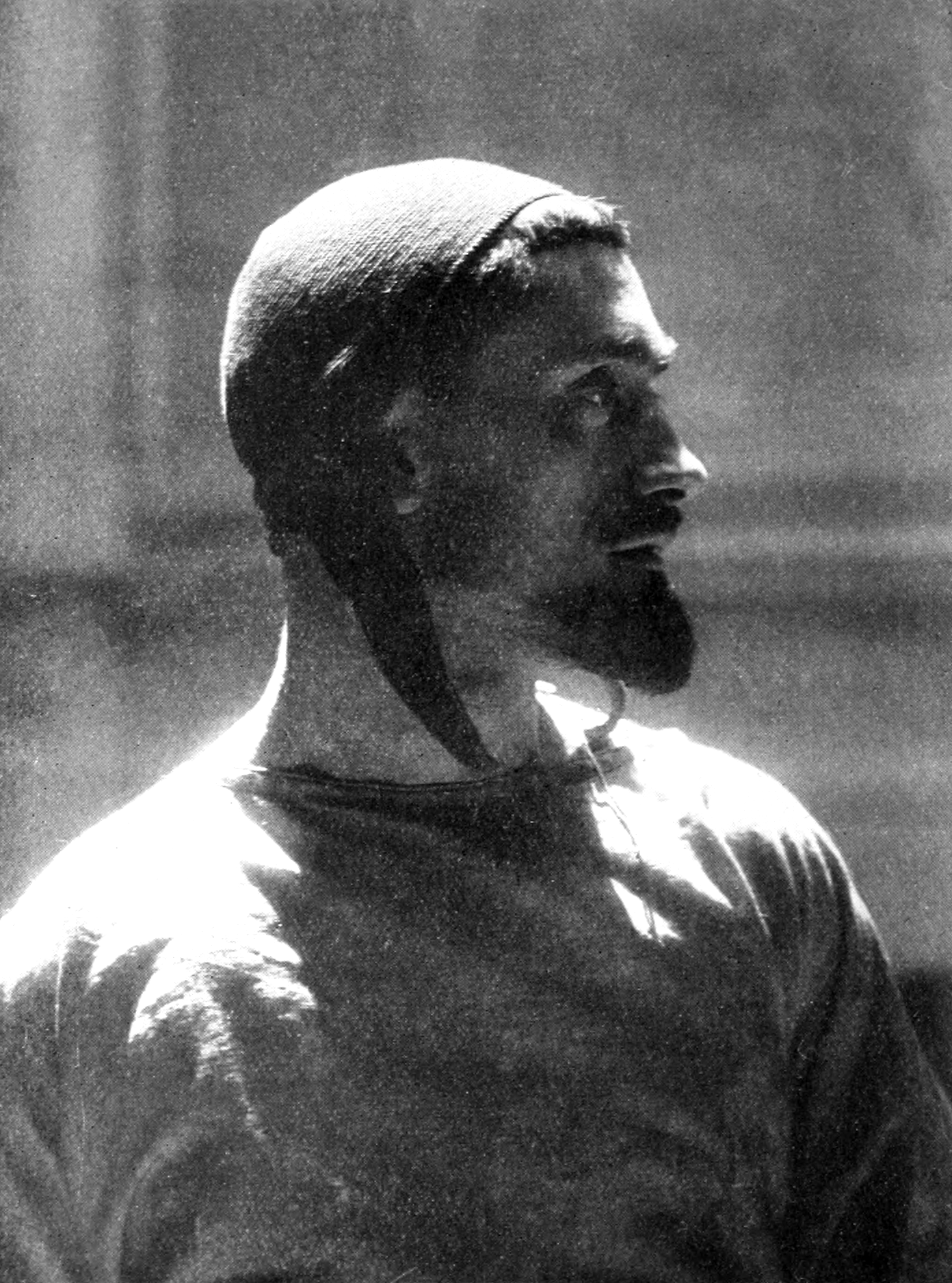
Angelo Zanelli

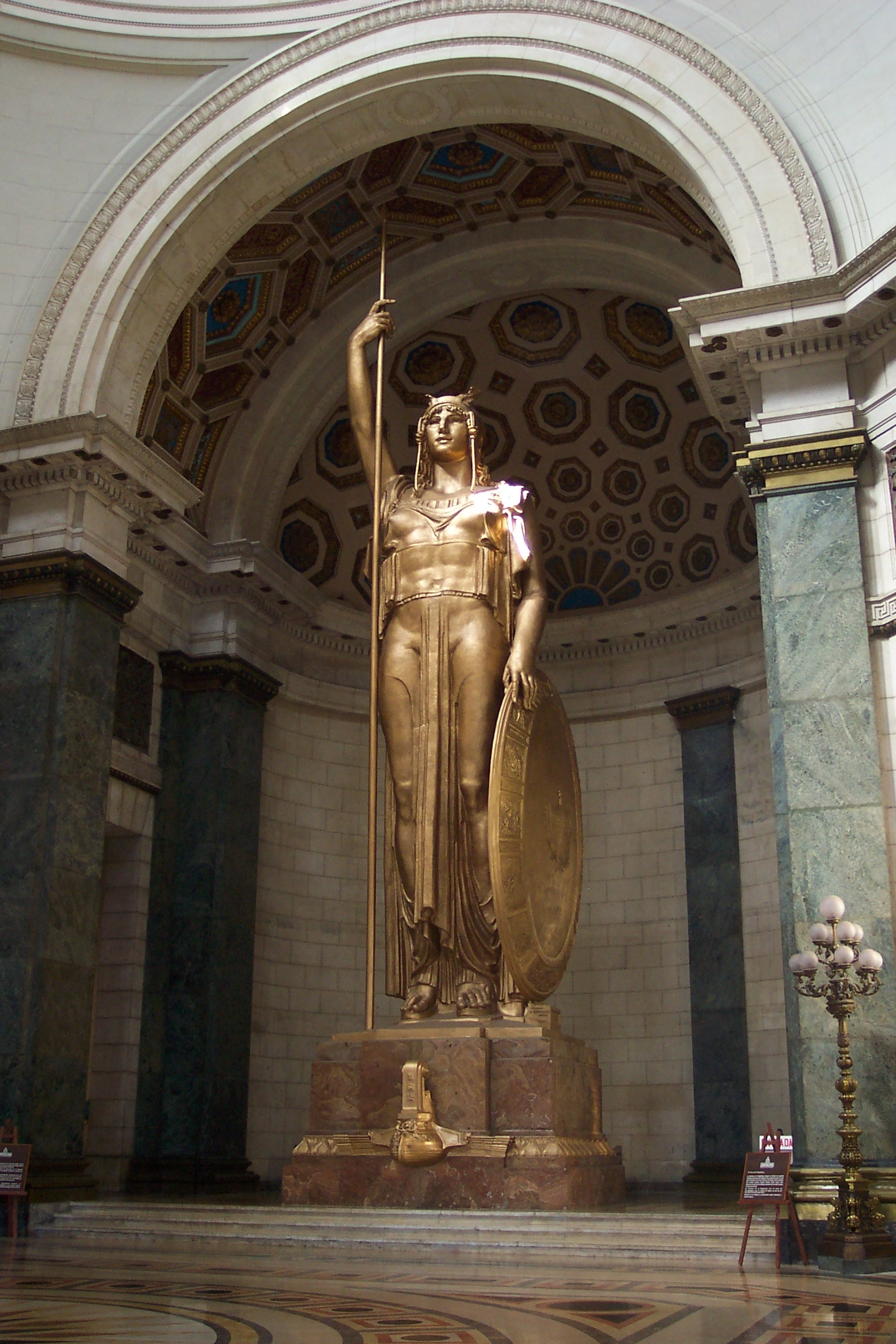
Statue of the Republic

Angelo Zanelli (1879–1942) was an Italian sculptor.

== Biography ==
Angelo Zanelli was born in 1879, at San Felice del Benaco, near Brescia.

In 1904 he moved to Rome, where he met Felice Carena. He won the contract for the realisation of sculptures in the large Monument to Vittorio Emanuele II in the same city, to which he worked until 1925. They include the tomb of the Unknown Soldier and the statue of the Goddess Rome. He usually worked for public commissions, also abroad.

Zanelli's students included Hazel Brill Jackson.

== Selected works ==
- Sculptures of the Monument to Vittorio Emanuele II (1925), Rome
- Monument to the Victims of World War I, Imola (1928)
- "Statue of the Republic" (1929), El Capitolio, Havana, Cuba.
- "El Trabajo" (1929), El Capitolio, Havana, Cuba.
- "La Virtud Tutelar" (1929), El Capitolio, Havana, Cuba.
