= Nicola Cantalamessa Papotti =

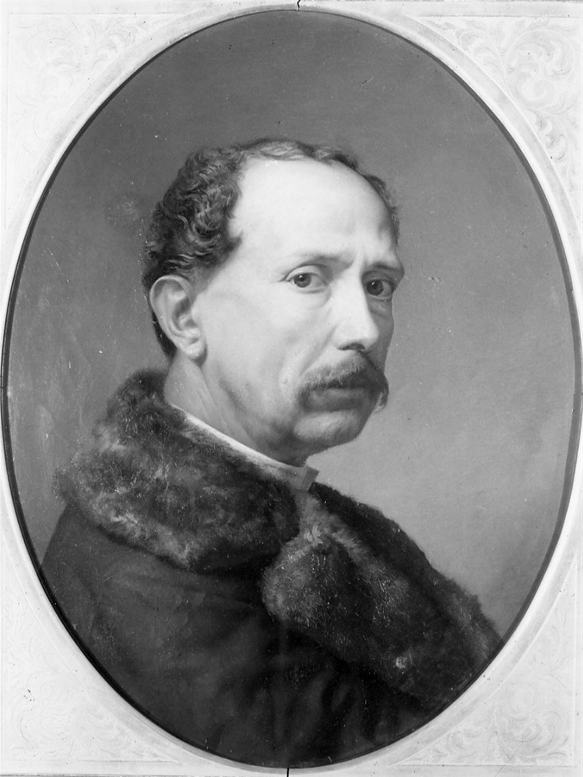
Portrait by Giulio Cantalamessa (unrelated but also from Ascoli), 1869

Nicola Cantalamessa Papotti (21 January 1831 – 30 August 1910) was an Italian sculptor. His marble busts, statues, and bas-reliefs were widely commissioned in the United States apart from in Italy. He also made a few bronze works.

== Biography ==
Cantalamessa was born in Ascoli Piceno, son of Carolina and Luigi. He studied at the School of letters and arts and worked in the studies of sculptors Emidio and Giorgi Paci who specialized in sacred and funerary art. He then went to Rome and studied under Pietro Tenerani. He completed the works of his master and in 1853 he started his own studio. Among his first works was a group on the hunt theme with Daphnis, Cloris, Cupid, and Spring. Another early commission was in 1855 and for use in the main entrance of the Apodimonte Palace of Ferdinand II of Naples. He also made an equestrian monument for Maria Sofia, Queen of Naples, in Vienna. From 1857 he received many commissions from the United States from wealthy clients including a monument for General Sumner in the Forest Hills Cemetery, Boston and George Ellwanger in Mount Hope Cemetery, Rochester. He took part in the Philadelphia Exposition (1876). In 1881 he designed a monument for J. A. Garfield. He also made a monument for the industrialist H. J. Chisholm which was cast in bronze in the Bastianelli foundry, Rome, and the installation at Cleveland was inaugurated in 1884. He was made a member of the Accademia di San Luca. A monument to Victor Emmanuel II was made for the city of Ascoli in 1879. Towards the end of his life, he faced financial hardship and began to work for other sculptors. He also worked for restoring ancient sculptures for the antiquarian Simonetti. He died in Rome.
