= Carlo Fontana (sculptor) =

Italian sculptor

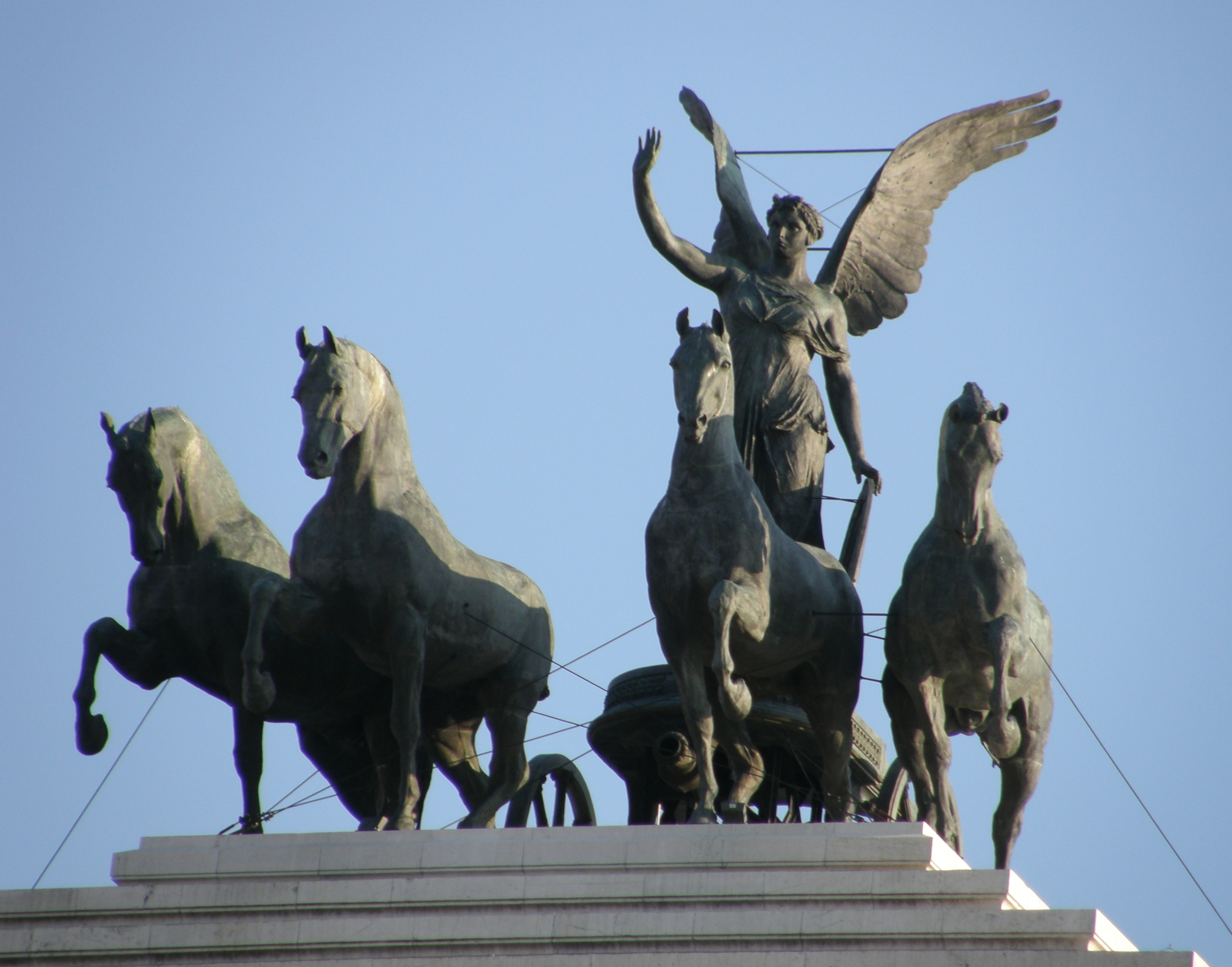
- Roma Vittoriano – Quadriga dell'Unità
- Born: 5 October 1865; Carrara, Italy
- Died: 16 November 1956 (aged 91); Sarzana, Italy
- Occupation: Sculptor

Carlo Fontana (5 October 1865 – 16 November 1956) was an Italian sculptor. His work was part of the sculpture event in the art competition at the 1928 Summer Olympics.
