= Victor Emmanuel II Monument =

Building in Rome, Italy

Victor Emmanuel II National Monument
- Monumento Nazionale a Vittorio Emanuele II
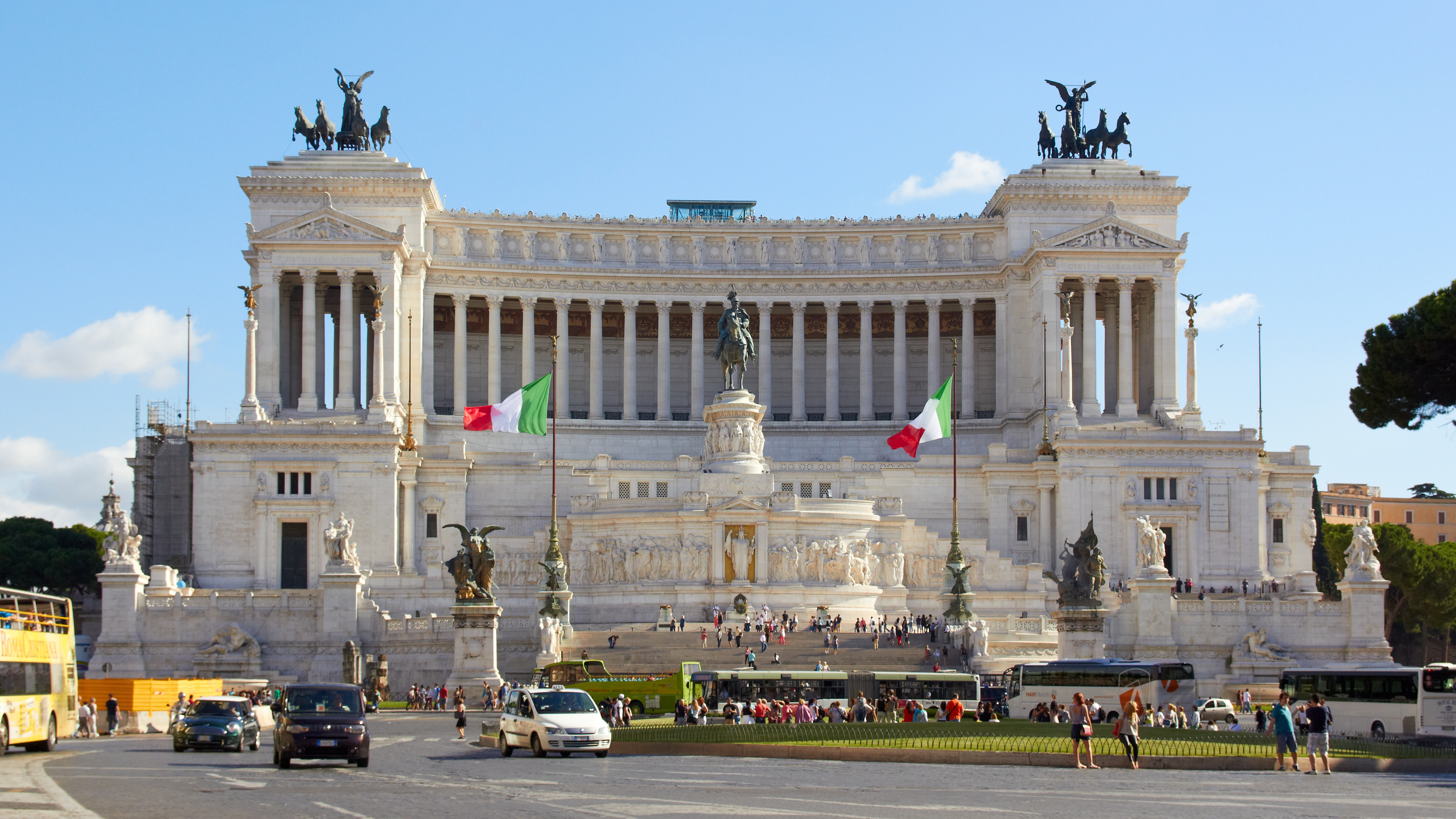
- View from Piazza Venezia
- Click on the map for a fullscreen view
- Alternative names: "Mole del Vittoriano" "Il Vittoriano" "Altare della Patria"

General information
- Type: National monument
- Architectural style: Neoclassical with eclectic influences
- Location: Rome, Italy, Piazza Venezia
- Coordinates: 41°53′41″N 12°28′59″E
- Construction started: 1885
- Completed: 1935
- Inaugurated: 4 June 1911
- Owner: Ministry of Cultural Heritage and Activities

Height
- Height: 81 m (266 ft)

Dimensions
- Other dimensions: 135 m (443 ft) across x 130 m (427 ft) deep

Technical details
- Floor area: 717,000 m^{2} (7,717,724 sq ft)
- Lifts/elevators: 1
- Grounds: 1.755 ha (4.34 acres)

Design and construction
- Architect: Giuseppe Sacconi

The Victor Emmanuel II National Monument (Italian: Monumento Nazionale a Vittorio Emanuele II), also known as the Vittoriano or for synecdoche Altare della Patria ("Altar of the Fatherland"), is a large national monument built between 1885 and 1935 to honour Victor Emmanuel II, the first king of a unified Italy, in Rome, Italy. It occupies a site between the Piazza Venezia and the Capitoline Hill. The monument was designed by Giuseppe Sacconi.

From an architectural perspective, it was conceived as a modern forum, an agora on three levels connected by stairways and dominated by a portico characterized by a colonnade. The complex process of national unity and liberation from foreign domination carried out by King Victor Emmanuel II of Savoy, to whom the monument is dedicated, has a great symbolic and representative value, being architecturally and artistically centred on the unification of Italy—for this reason the Vittoriano is considered one of the national symbols of Italy.

It also preserves the Altar of the Fatherland (Italian: Altare della Patria), first an altar of the goddess Roma, then also a shrine of the Italian Unknown Soldier, thus adopting the function of a secular temple consecrated to Italy. Because of its great representative value, the entire Vittoriano is often called the Altare della Patria, although the latter constitutes only a part of the monument.

It is currently managed by the Polo Museale del Lazio and is owned by the Ministry of Cultural Heritage and Activities.

== General description ==
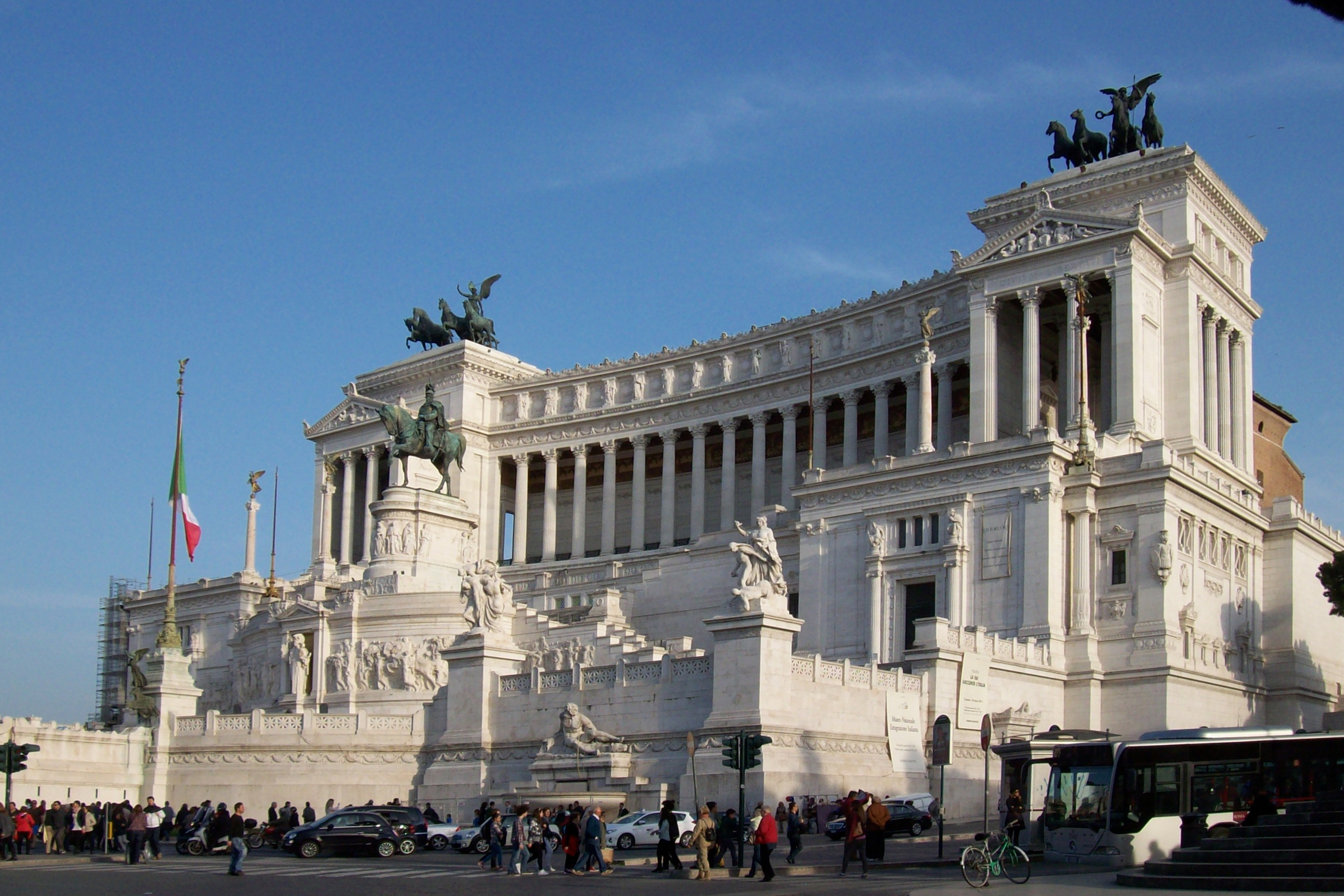
The Vittoriano

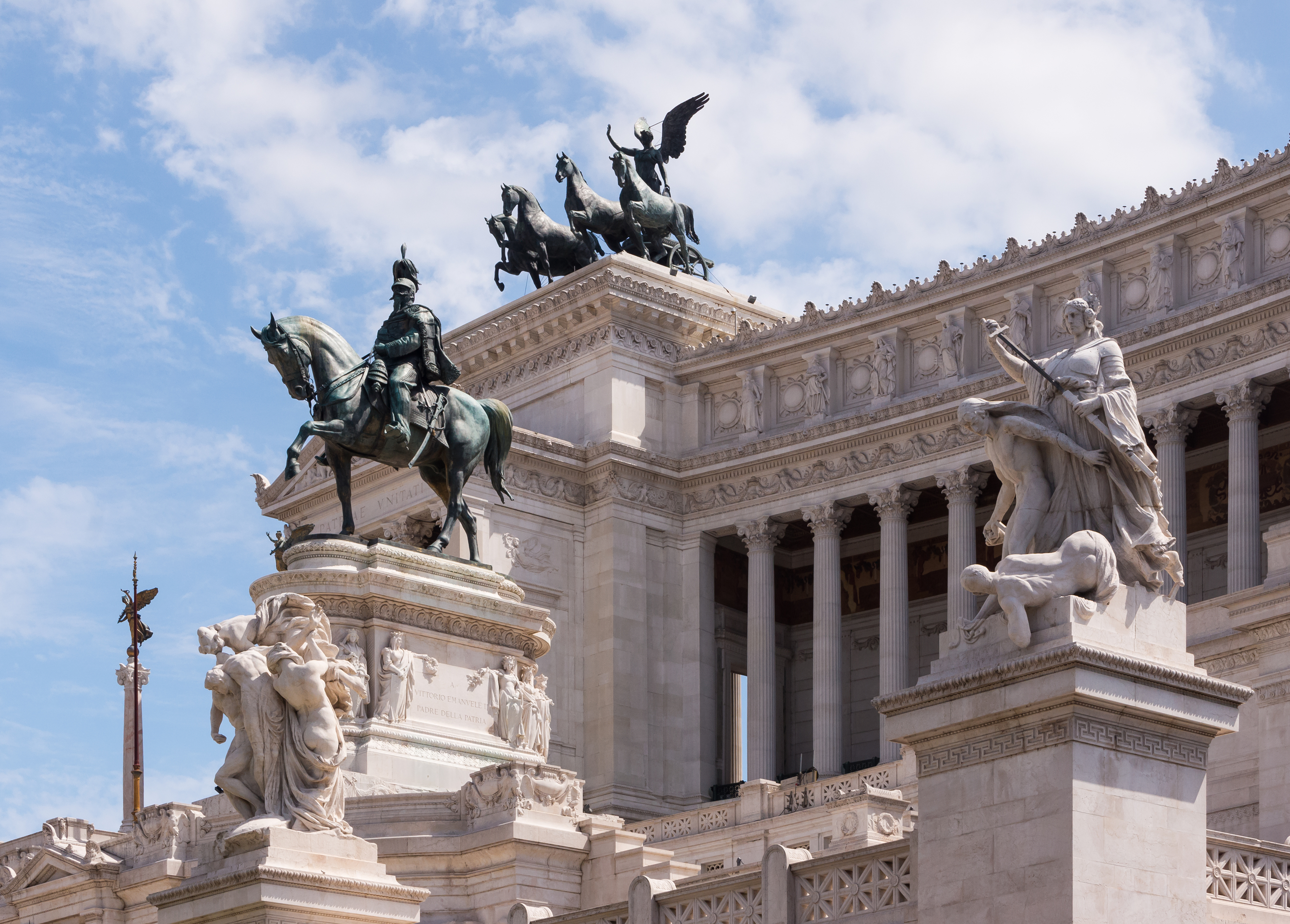
View of the artistic and architectural works present in the Vittoriano

The Vittoriano is on the Capitoline Hill, in the symbolic centre of ancient Rome, and is connected to the modern one thanks to roads that radiate from Piazza Venezia.

Its design is a neoclassical interpretation of the Roman Forum. It features stairways, Corinthian columns, fountains, an equestrian statue of Victor Emmanuel II, and two statues of the goddess Victoria riding on quadrigas. On its summit is a majestic portico characterized by a long colonnade and two imposing propylaea, one dedicated to the "unity of the homeland", and the other to the "freedom of the citizens", concepts metaphorically linked to the figure of Victor Emmanuel II.

The base houses the museum of Italian unification, and in 2007 a lift was added to the structure, allowing visitors to access the roof for 360-degree views of Rome. This terrace, which is the highest of the monument, can also be reached via 196 steps that start from the portico.

The structure is 135 m (443 ft) wide, 130 m (427 ft) deep, and 70 m (230 ft) high. If the quadrigae and Winged Victories are included, the height reaches 81 m (266 ft). It has a total area of 17,550 m^{2} (188,907 sq ft) and possesses, due to the conspicuous development of the interior spaces, a floor area of 717,000 m^{2} (7,717,724 sq ft).

One of the architecturally predominant elements of the Vittoriano are the external staircases, which constitute in the complex 243 steps, and the portico on the top of the monument, which is inserted between two lateral propylaea. The entrance stairway is 41 m (135 ft) wide and 34 m (112 ft) long, the terrace of the Altar of the Fatherland is 66 m (217 ft) wide. The maximum depth of the Vittoriano underground reaches 17 m (56 ft) below street level. The colonnade is formed by columns 15 m (49 ft) high and the length of the porch is 72 m (236 ft).

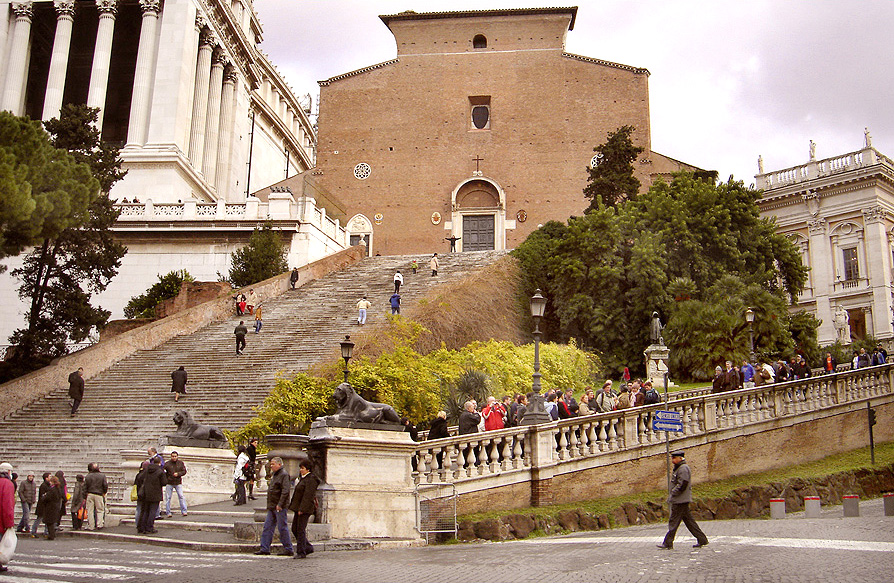
The Basilica of Santa Maria in Ara Coeli. The Vittoriano can be seen on the left.

The allegories of the monument mostly represent the virtues and feelings, very often rendered as personifications, also according to the canons of the neoclassical style, which animate the Italians during the Italian unification, or from the revolutions of 1820 to the capture of Rome (1870), through which national unity was achieved. Due to the complex process of unification undertaken by Victor Emmanuel II throughout the second half of the 19th century, the Italians gave him the epithet of Father of the Fatherland (Italian: Padre della Patria). The only non-allegorical work is the equestrian statue of Victor Emmanuel II, which is the architectural centre of the Vittoriano.

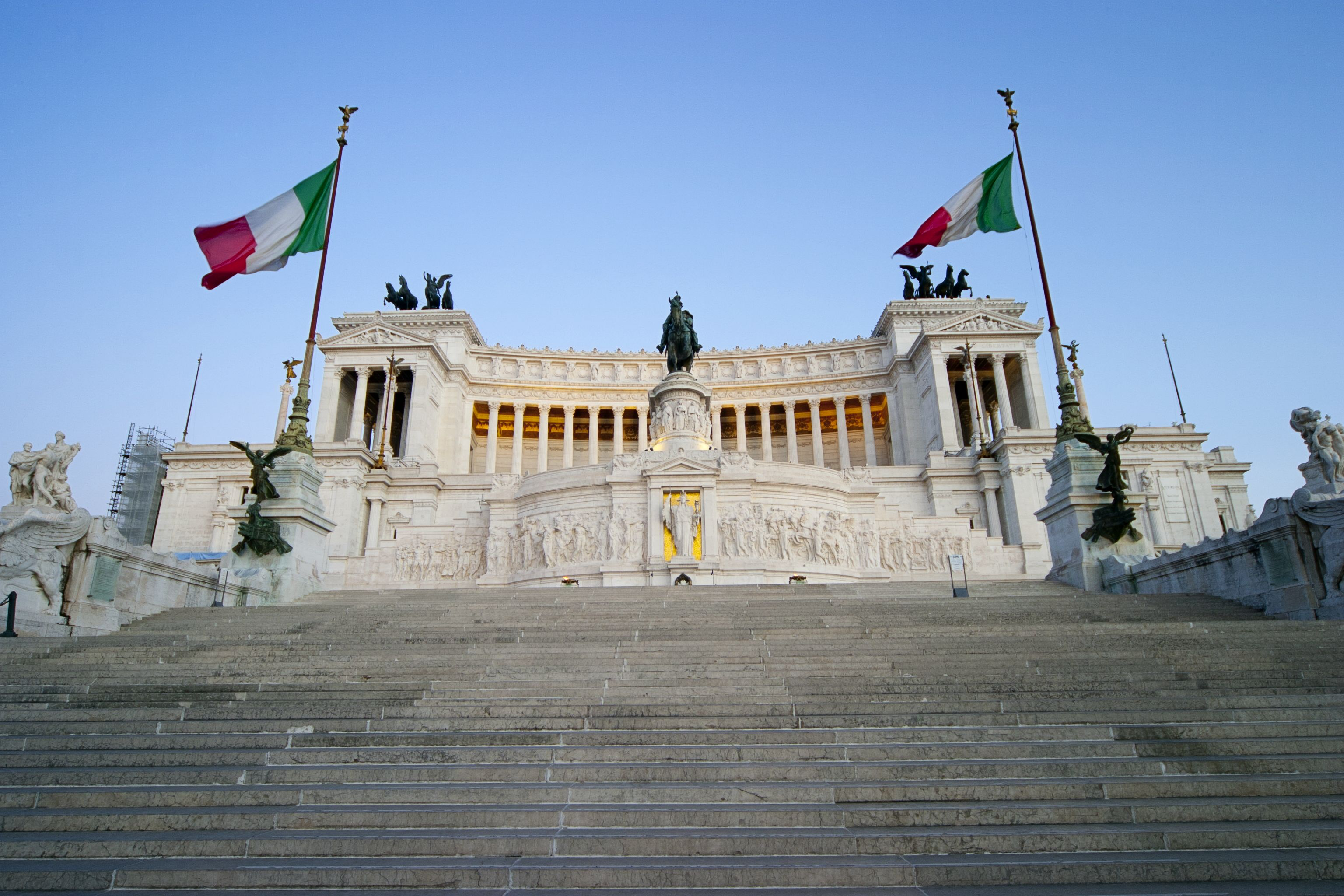
The entrance stairway of Vittoriano

The monument, as a whole, appears as a sort of marble covering on the northern slope of the Capitoline Hill: it was therefore thought of as a place where it is possible to make an uninterrupted patriotic walk (the path does not in fact have an architectural end, given that the entrances to the highest part are two, one for each propylaeum) among the works present, which almost all have allegorical meanings linked to the history of Italy. There are various botanical symbols present, including the palm, representing "victory", the oak ("strength"), the laurel ("victorious peace"), the myrtle ("sacrifice") and the olive tree ("concord").

From a stylistic perspective, the architecture and works of art that embellish the Vittoriano have been conceived with the aim of creating a "national style" to be replicated in other areas. It was designed to communicate the imperial splendours of ancient Rome. Above all, for the realization of the Vittoriano, Giuseppe Sacconi took inspiration from the Neoclassical architecture—the reborn heir of the classical Greek and Roman architecture, on which Italic elements were grafted and eclectic influences added.

The Vittoriano is regarded as a national symbol of Italy and every year it hosts important national celebrations. The largest annual celebrations are Liberation Day (25 April), Republic Day (2 June), and Armed Forces Day (4 November). During these celebrations, the President of the Italian Republic and the highest government officials pay tribute to the Italian Unknown Soldier and those who died in the line of duty by laying a laurel wreath.

== History ==
After the death of Victor Emmanuel II of Savoy on 9 January 1878, many initiatives were destined to raise a permanent monument that celebrated the first king of a united Italy, creator of the process of unification and liberation from foreign domination, which is indicated by historiography as "Father of the Fatherland" also due to the political work of the President of the Council of Ministers of the Kingdom of Sardinia Camillo Benso, Count of Cavour, and to the military contribution of Giuseppe Garibaldi. The goal was therefore to commemorate the entire Italian unification season ("Risorgimento") through one of its protagonists.

For this purpose, the Italian government approved the construction of a monumental complex on the Northern side of Rome's Capitoline Hill. The monument would celebrate the legacy of the first king of a united Italy and would become a symbol of national patriotism. The project was realized by Giuseppe Sacconi in 1885, in an eclectic style.

Sacconi was inspired by the Hellenistic sanctuaries, such as the Pergamon Altar and the Sanctuary of Fortuna Primigenia in Palestrina. The Vittoriano was conceived as a vast and modern forum open to citizens, on a sort of elevated square in the historic centre of Rome organized as an agora on three levels connected by tiers, with conspicuous spaces reserved for strolling visitors.

To erect the Vittoriano it was necessary, between the last months of 1884 and 1899, to proceed with numerous expropriations and extensive demolitions of the buildings that were on the site. The place chosen was in the heart of the historic centre of Rome and was therefore occupied by ancient buildings arranged according to urban planning that dated back to the Middle Ages. This was considered necessary because the Vittoriano should have been built in the heart of the historic centre of Rome, in a modern urban context, in front of a new large square (the future Piazza Venezia), which at the time was just a narrow open space in front of Palazzo Venezia.

The general objective was also to make Rome a modern European capital that rivaled Berlin, Vienna, London and Paris overcoming the centuries-old pontifical town planning. In this context, the Vittoriano would have been the equivalent of the Brandenburg Gate of Berlin, the Admiralty Arch of London and the Opéra Garnier of Paris; these buildings are all united by a monumental and classical aspect that metaphorically communicates pride and the power of the nation that erected them.

It would then become one of the symbols of the new Italy, joining the monuments of ancient Rome and those of the popes' Rome. Having then been conceived as a large public square, the Vittoriano, in addition to representing a memorial dedicated to Victor Emmanuel II, was invested with another role—a modern forum dedicated to the new free and united Italy.

Established Italian sculptors, such as Leonardo Bistolfi, Manfredo Manfredi, Giulio Monteverde, Francesco Jerace, Augusto Rivalta, Lodovico Pogliaghi, Pietro Canonica, Ettore Ximenes, Adolfo Apolloni, Mario Rutelli and Angelo Zanelli, made its sculptures nationwide. The partly completed monument was inaugurated on 4 June 1911, on the occasion of the Turin International world's fair and the 50th anniversary of Italian unification. Construction continued throughout the first half of the 20th century; in 1921 the body of the Italian Unknown Soldier was placed in the crypt under the statue of the goddess Roma, and in 1935 the monument was fully completed amidst the inauguration of the Museo Centrale del Risorgimento Italiano.

The decision to include an altar dedicated to the homeland in the Vittoriano was taken by Giuseppe Sacconi only after the planning phase, during the construction of the monument. The place and the dominant subject were immediately chosen, being a large statue of the goddess Roma that would have been placed on the first terrace after the entrance to the monument, just below the equestrian statue of Victor Emmanuel II. Thus, the Altar of the Fatherland, at least initially and before the burial of the body of the Unknown Soldier, was thought of as a chapel of the deity. In this way, the greatness and majesty of Rome was celebrated, elected to the role of legitimate capital of Italy. Within the Vittoriano are numerous artistic works that recall the history of ancient Rome.

After the First World War the Vittoriano was chosen to house the tomb of the Unknown Soldier, or the burial of an Italian soldier who died during the First World War whose identity remains unknown due to the serious injuries that made the body unrecognizable, which represents all the Italian soldiers who died during the wars. The reason for his strong symbolism lies in the metaphorical transition from the figure of the soldier to that of the people and finally to that of the nation. This transition between increasingly broader and generic concepts is due to the indistinct traits of the non-identification of the soldier.

The Vittoriano was thus consecrated to a wide symbolic value representing a lay temple metaphorically dedicated to a free and united Italy—celebrating by virtue the burial of the Unknown Soldier (the sacrifice for the homeland and for the connected ideals).

With the rise of Fascism in 1922, the Vittoriano became the setting for the military parades of the authoritarian regime of Benito Mussolini. After World War II, with the institution of the Italian Republic in 1946, the monument was stripped of all its Fascist symbols and reassumed its original function as a secular temple dedicated to the Italian nation and its people. Throughout the second half of the 20th century, however, its significance as a symbol of national identity started to decline as the public opinion started to perceive it as a cumbersome relic. At the turn of the 21st century, Italy's President Carlo Azeglio Ciampi pushed for a revaluation of national symbols of Italy, including the Vittoriano.

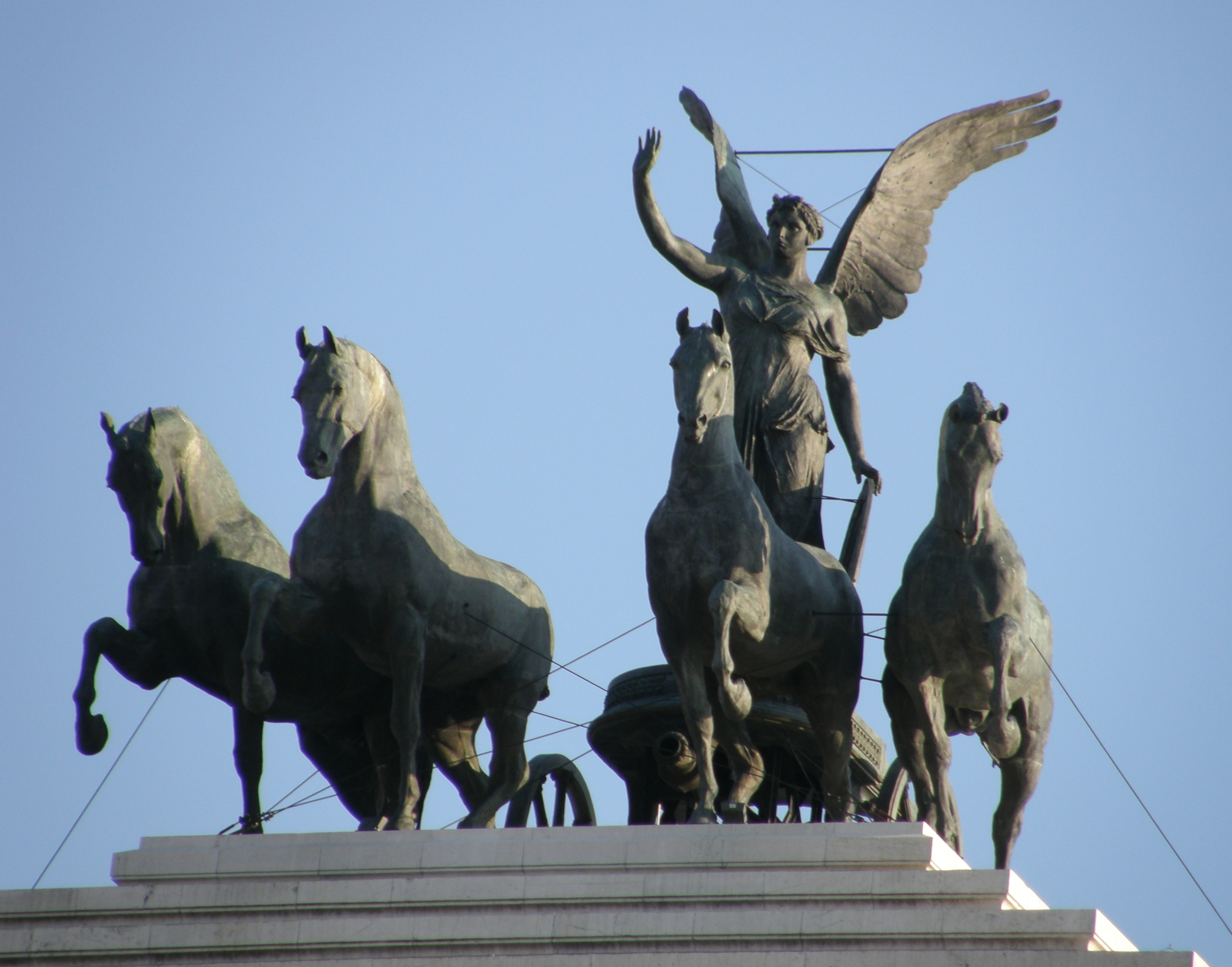
The Quadriga of Unity on the summit of one of the two propylaea

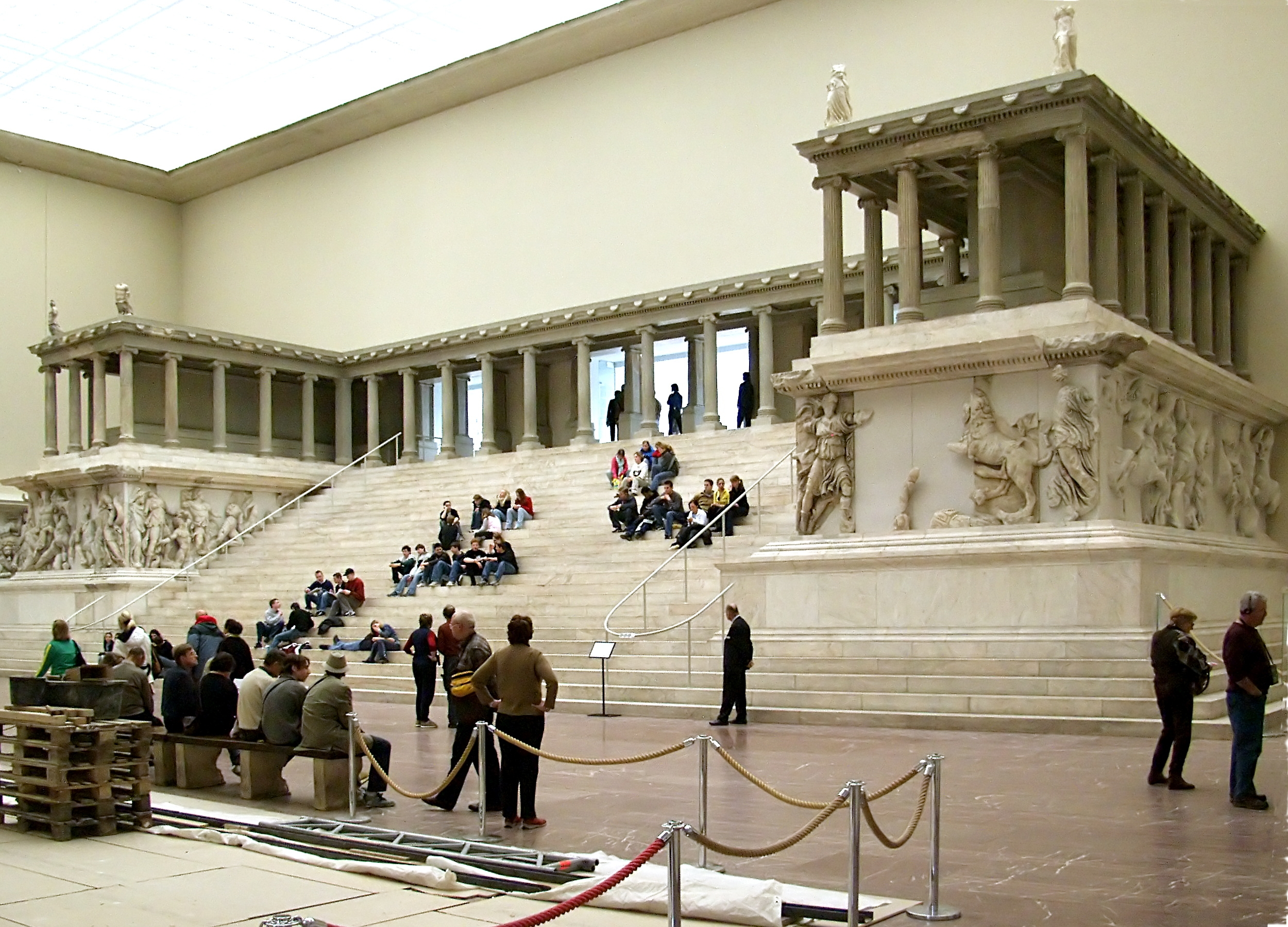
The façade of the Pergamon Altar inspired Giuseppe Sacconi for the general project of the Vittoriano

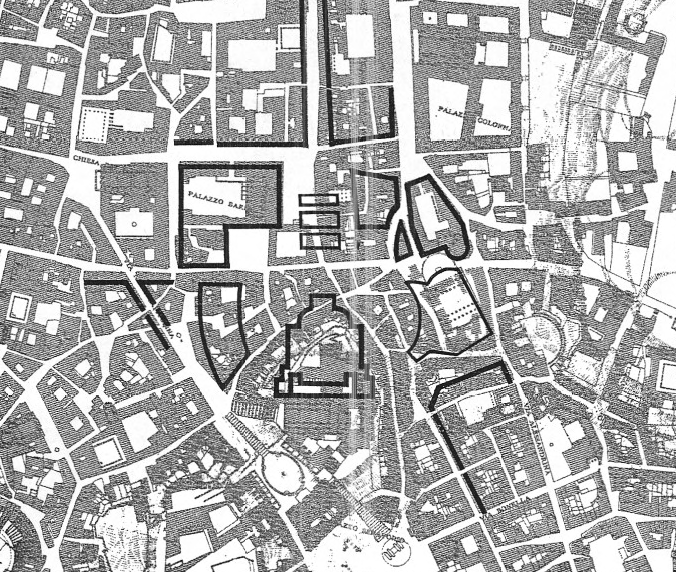
The demolition area on a map from 1870 where the Vittoriano and the future Piazza Venezia are marked in black

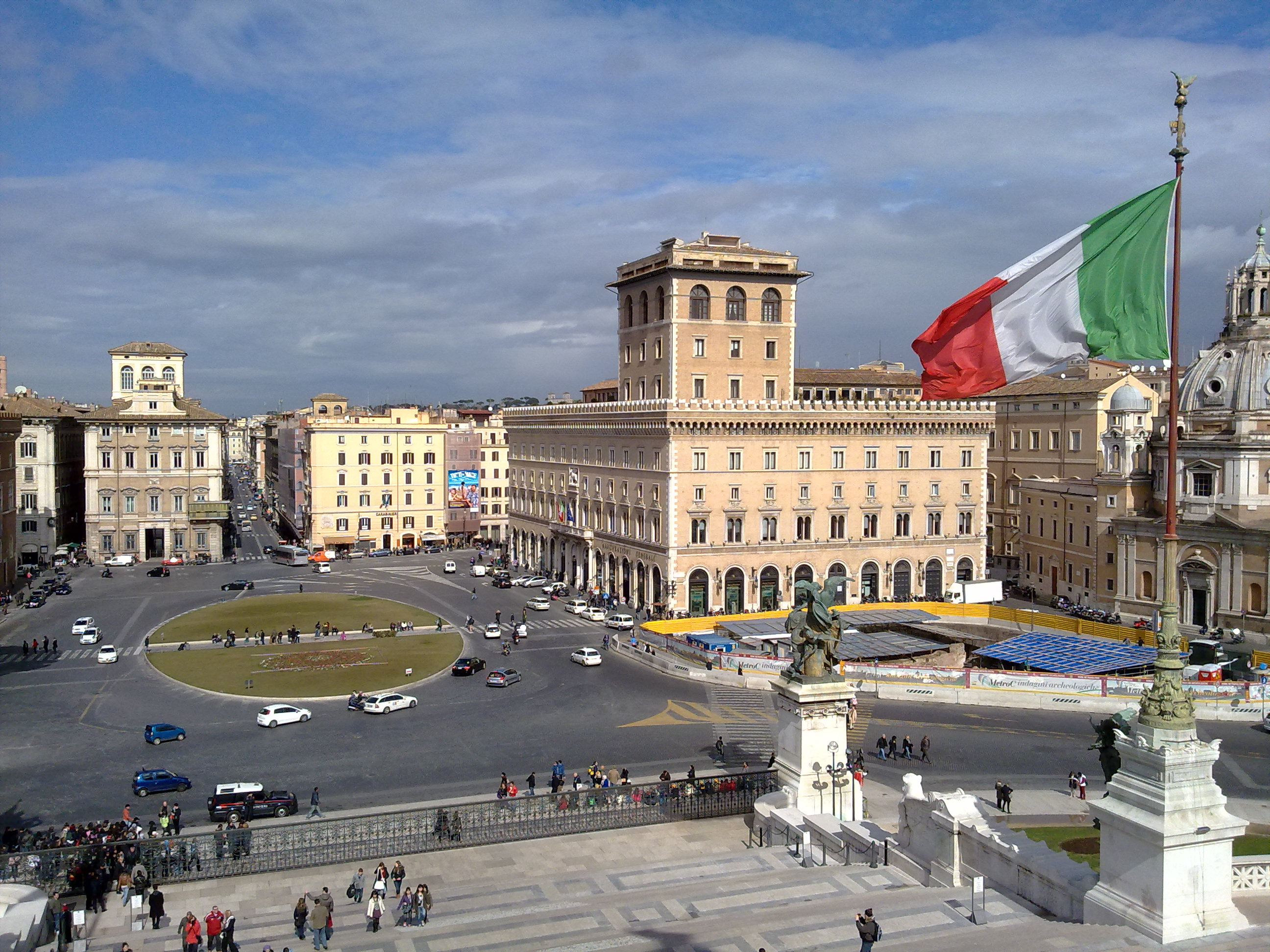
Piazza Venezia as seen from the Vittoriano terraces

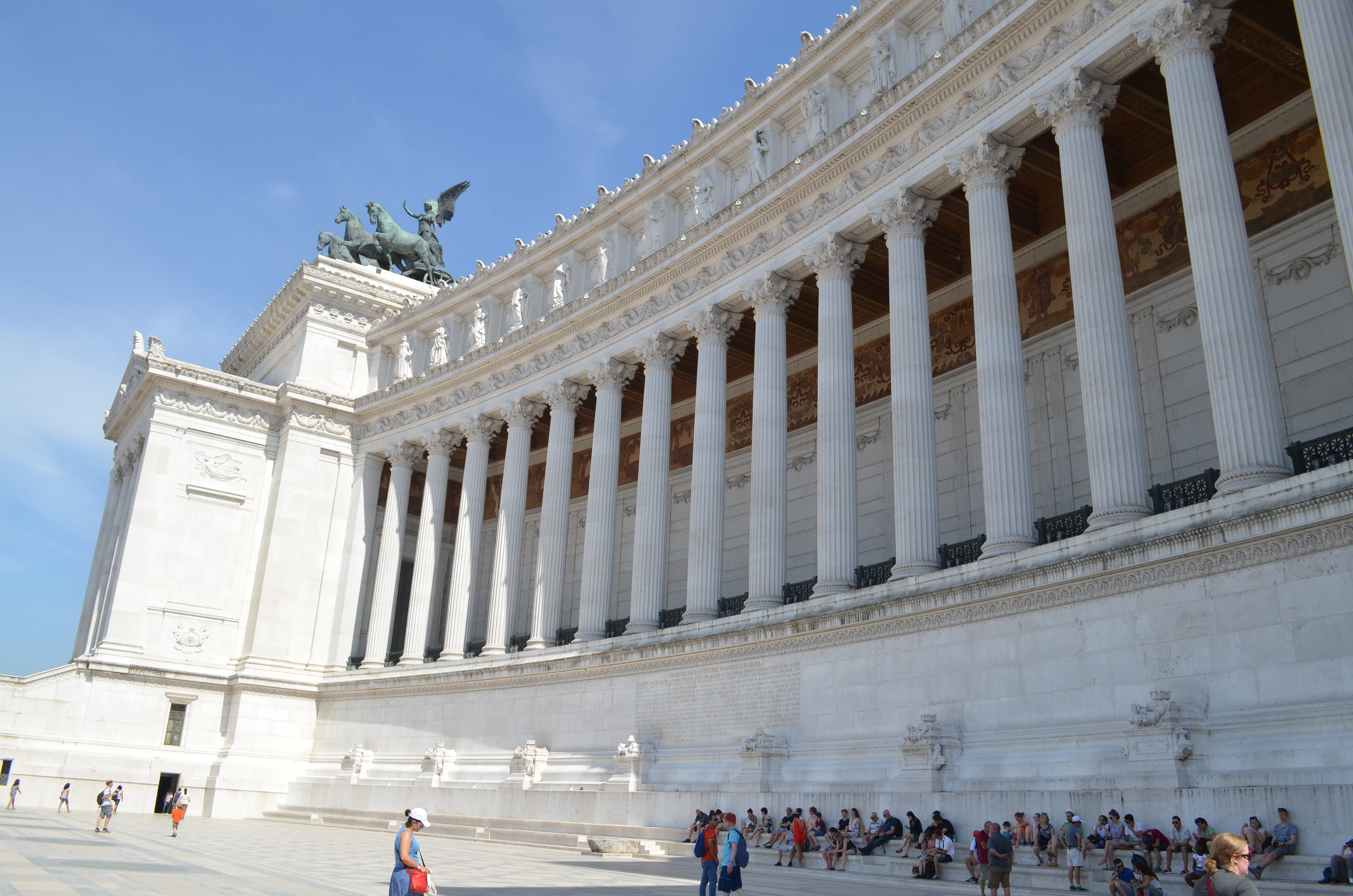
Detail of the portico and one of the two propylaea

== Tomb of the Unknown Soldier ==
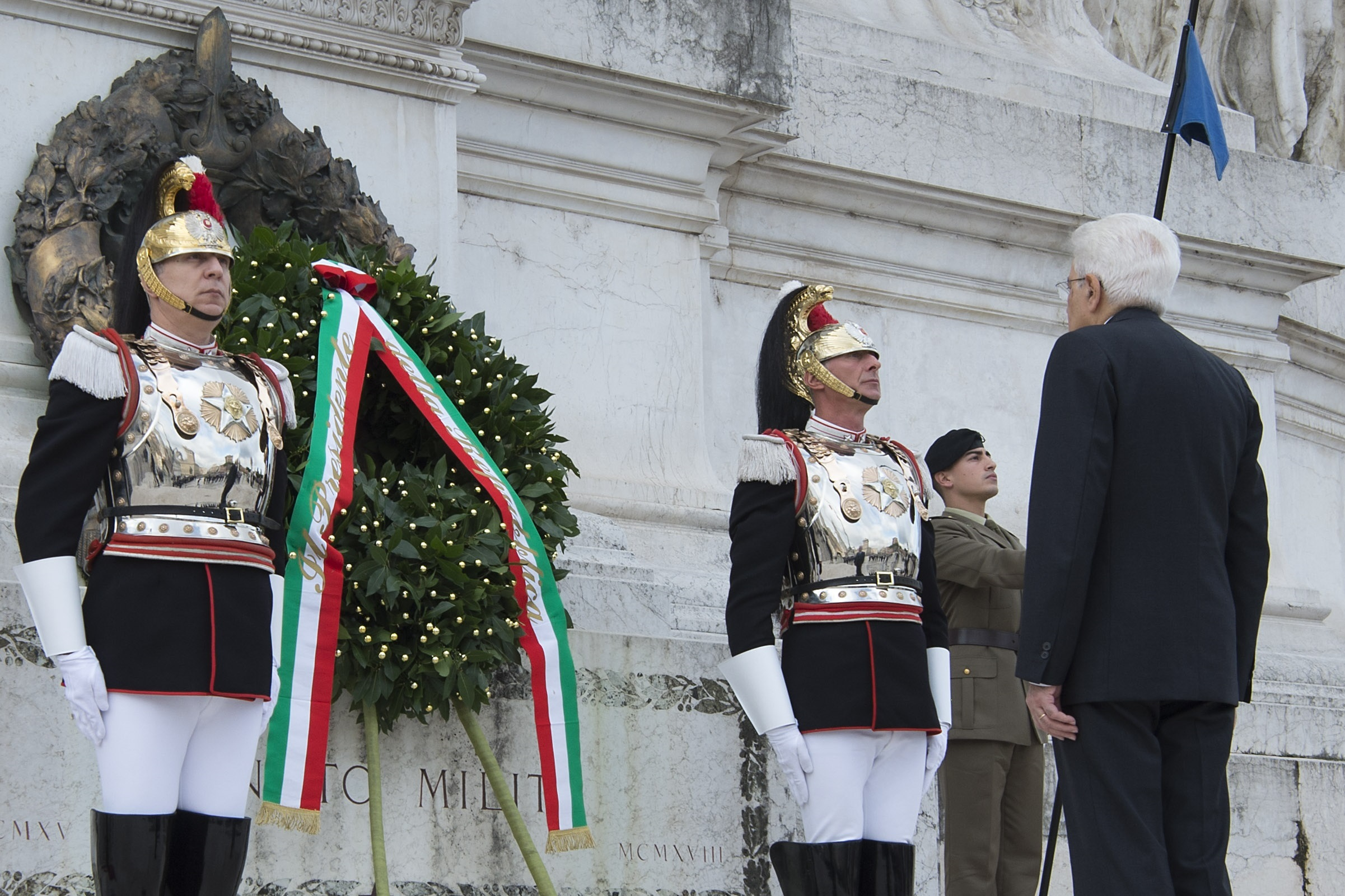
President Sergio Mattarella pays tribute to the Tomb of the Unknown Soldier on November 4, 2016.

The monument holds the Tomb of the Italian Unknown Soldier with an eternal flame, built under the statue of goddess Roma after World War I following an idea of General Giulio Douhet. The body of the unknown soldier was chosen on 28 October 1921 from among 11 unknown remains by Maria Bergamas, a woman from Gradisca d'Isonzo whose only child was killed during World War I. Her son's body was never recovered. The selected unknown was transferred from Aquileia, where the ceremony with Bergamas had taken place, to Rome and buried in a state funeral on 4 November 1921.

His tomb is a symbolic shrine that represents all the fallen and missing of the war. The side of the tomb of the Unknown Soldier that gives outward at the Altar of the Fatherland is always guarded by a guard of honour and two flames that burn perpetually in braziers. The guard is provided with military personnel of the various weapons of the Italian Armed Forces, which alternate every ten years.

The allegorical meaning of the perpetually burning flames is linked to their symbolism, which is centuries old, since it has its origins in classical antiquity, especially in the cult of the dead. A fire that burns eternally symbolizes the memory, in this case of the sacrifice of the Unknown Soldier moved by patriotic love, and his everlasting memory of the Italians, even in those who are far from their country. The two perennial braziers next to the Tomb of the Unknown Soldier is placed a plaque whose text reads "Italians Abroad to the Motherland" in memory of donations made by Italian emigrants between the end of the 19th century and the beginning of the 20th century for the construction of the Vittoriano.

== Names ==
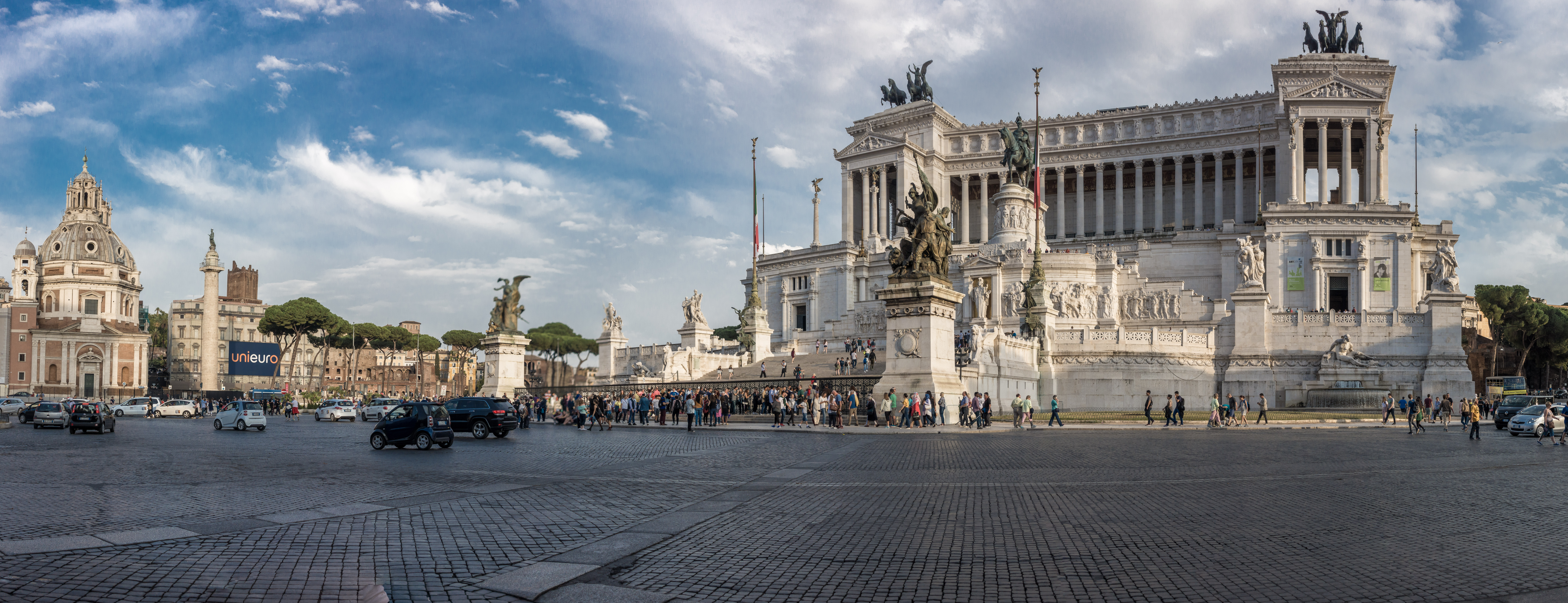
A view from the Piazza Venezia, looking towards Vittoriano from the northwest

The Victor Emmanuel II National Monument is also known as "Mole del Vittoriano" or simply the "Vittoriano", and "Altare della Patria", which are now the most commonly used names for it. From 1921, when the Unknown Soldier was buried under the statue of the goddess Roma in the part of the Vittoriano that is called "Altare della Patria", the expression began to indicate not only the place of burial of the soldier, or the personification of all the fallen and lost in war, but the whole structure due to the strong popular sentiment for the symbolic Unknown Soldier.

Colloquially, the monument is also known as "The Wedding Cake" or "The Typewriter".

== Plan ==
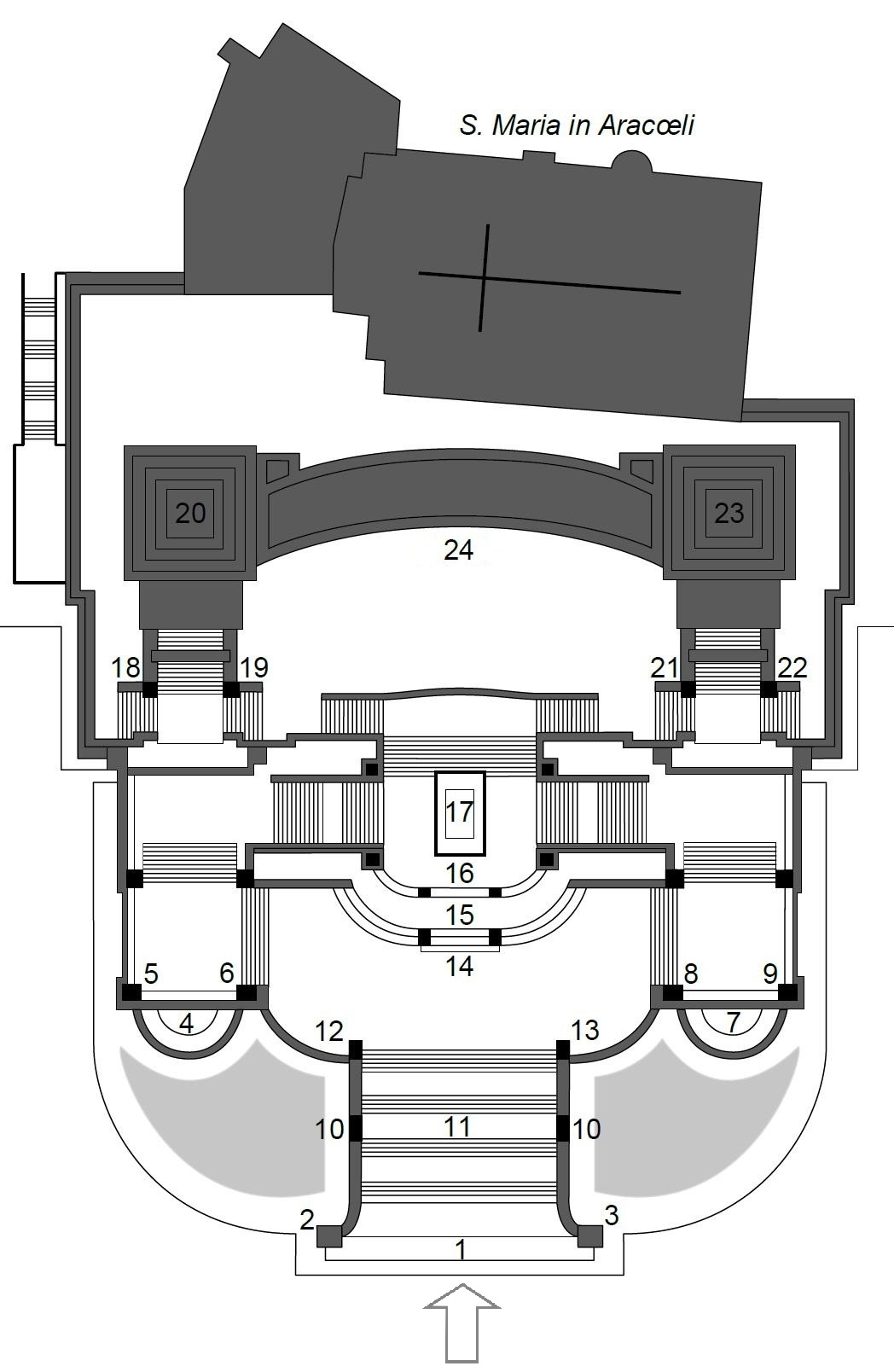
Schematic map of the Vittoriano

1. Vittoriano entrance with artistic gate by Manfredo Manfredi
2. Sculptural group The Thought by Giulio Monteverde
3. Sculptural group The Action by Francesco Jerace
4. Adriatic Fountain by Emilio Quadrelli
5. Sculptural group The Force by Augusto Rivalta
6. Sculptural group The Concord by Lodovico Pogliaghi
7. Tyrrhenus Fountain of Pietro Canonica
8. Sculptural group The Sacrifice by Leonardo Bistolfi
9. Sculptural group The Right by Ettore Ximenes
10. A statue on the side of the sculptural group
  Winged lion by Giuseppe Tonnini
11. Entrance stairway
12. Winged Victory on naval ram by Edoardo Rubino
13. Winged Victory on naval ram by Edoardo De Albertis
14. Tomb of the Italian Unknown Soldier
15. Statue of goddess Roma by Angelo Zanelli
16. Statues of fourteen Italian noble cities by Eugenio Maccagnani
17. Equestrian statue of Victor Emmanuel II by Enrico Chiaradia
18. Winged Victory on triumphal column by Nicola Cantalamessa Papotti
19. Winged Victory on triumphal column by Adolfo Apolloni
20. Propylaeus with colonnade on top of which is present
  the Quadriga of Unity by Carlo Fontana
21. Winged Victory on triumphal column by Mario Rutelli
22. Winged Victory on triumphal column by Cesare Zocchi
23. Propylaeus with colonnade on top of which is present
  the Quadriga of Freedom by Paolo Bartolini
24. Portico with colonnade whose upper cornice is decorated
  with statues representing the regions of Italy. In front of
  stylobate, towards the equestrian statue of Victor Emmanuel II,
  there is a terrace of the cities redeemed.

== Architectural and artistic works ==
=== Fountains of the two seas ===
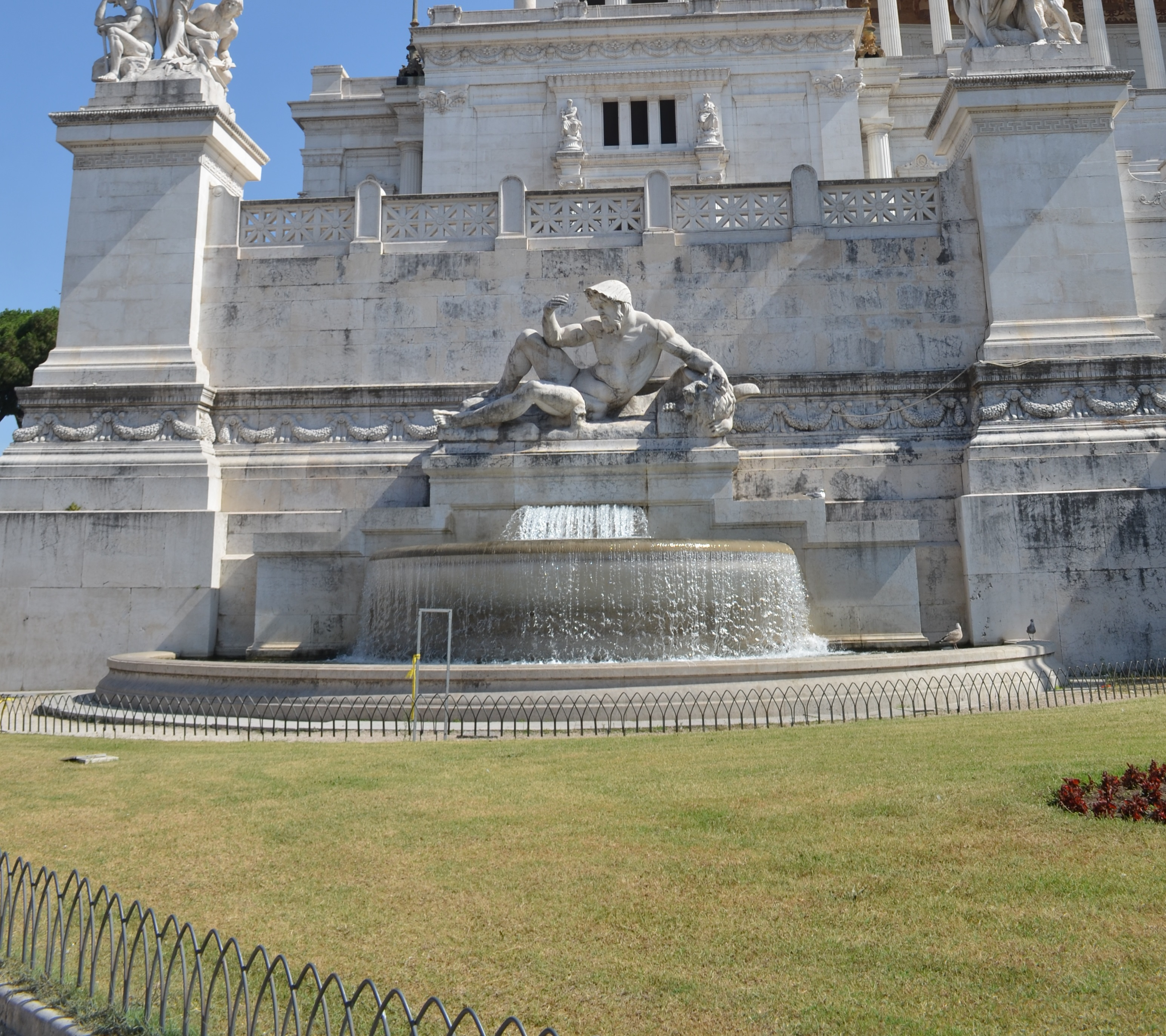
The Fountain of the Adriatic

Set against the external base of the Vittoriano, on the sides of the entrance to Piazza Venezia, are the "fountains of the two seas" which are dedicated to the Adriatic Sea and the Tyrrhenian Sea. Both are inserted in a flower bed and possess, from the beginning, a hydraulic system that recycles the water avoiding waste. Historically, a 500,000 litres (130,000 US gal) water cistern was also active, then abandoned, in the basement of the monument. The two fountains therefore represent the two major Italian seas and, therefore, in this perspective the Vittoriano is assimilated to the Italian Peninsula. This way the whole country is represented, even geographically.

=== External staircases and terraces ===
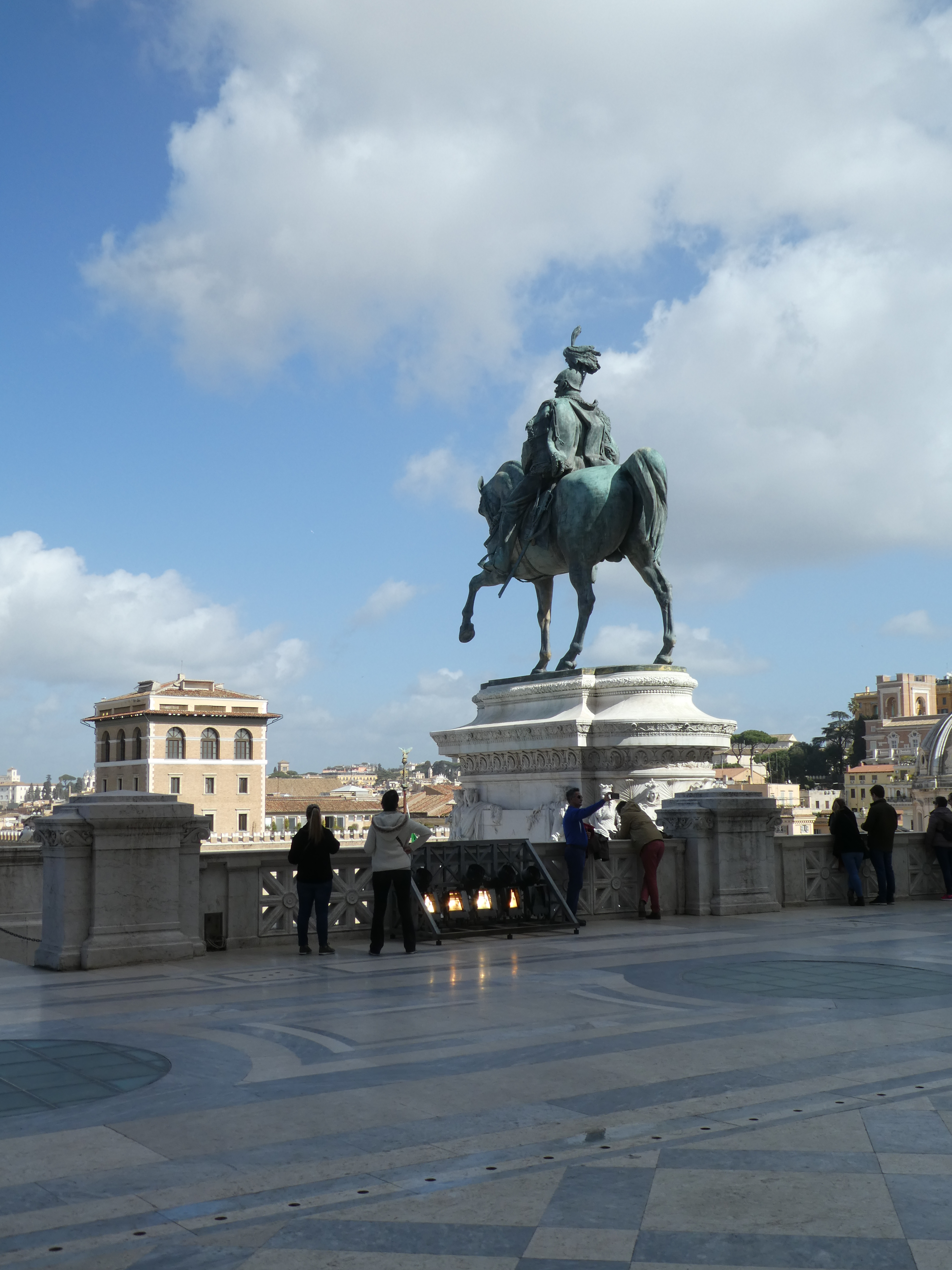
View of the terrace of the equestrian statue of Victor Emmanuel II

The exterior staircases of the Vittoriano follow the ascending sides of the northern slope of the Capitoline Hill and lead, starting from the entrance of Piazza Venezia, to the terrace of the Altar of the Fatherland, then to the terrace of the redeemed cities (the one immediately below the colonnade of the portico), and finally to the terraces of the two propylaea flanked by the portico constituting the two entrances.

At the entrance is a staircase leading to the terrace of the Altar of the Fatherland and of the Italian Unknown Soldier, which represent the first raised platform of the Vittoriano, as well as its symbolic centre. The path along the staircase continues beyond the tomb of the Unknown Soldier to symbolically represent a continuous and uninterrupted procession of Italians, continuing up to the highest point of the construction, the portico and the propylaea.

The artistic gate of access to the Vittoriano, which is the work of Manfredo Manfredi, is able to slide vertically underground on tracks. The plant that allows the lowering of the railing, originally hydraulic, was considered at the time of its construction among the most technologically advanced in the world. The entrance gate has a length of 40 m (131 ft) and a weight of 10,500 tons.

On both sides of the entrance stairway are a series of sculptures that accompany the visitor towards the Altar of the Fatherland. The first sculptures are two groups in gilded bronze, with subjects inspired by the thought of Giuseppe Mazzini, The Thought and The Action (respectively, to the left and right of the staircase for those coming from Piazza Venezia), followed by two sculptural groups (also in this case one on each side) depicting as many Winged lions and finally, on the top of the staircase, before the beginning of the terrace of the Altar of the Fatherland, two Winged Victorys. The Action has a triangular and angular profile, while The Thought has a circular shape. The Winged Victories, in addition to recalling the military and cultural successes of the Roman era, symbolize allegorically the good luck of national unity.

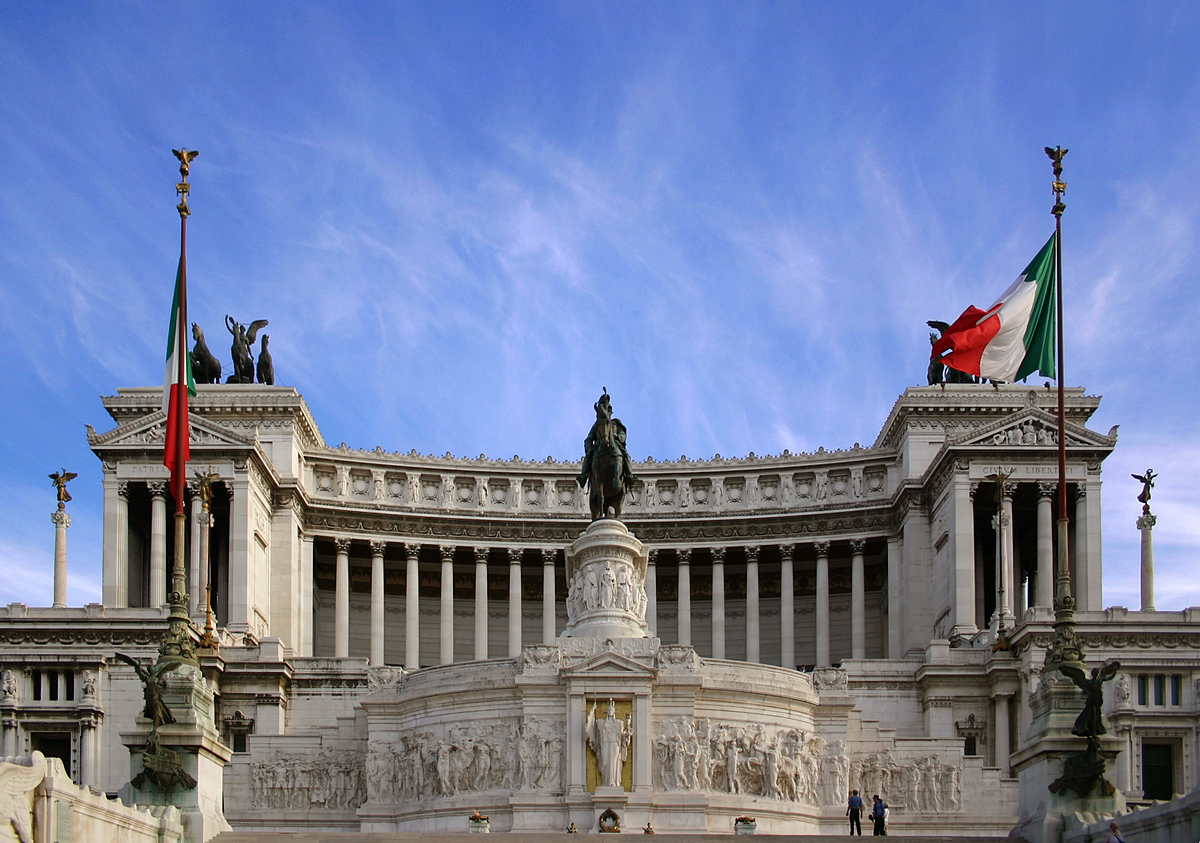
The equestrian statue of Victor Emmanuel II, at the architectural centre of the Vittoriano, above the Altar of the Fatherland, which is instead its symbolic centre

At the end of the entrance stairway, immediately after the statues of the Winged Victories, opens the terrace of the Altar of the Fatherland, the first raised platform of the Vittoriano, which is dominated centrally by the statue of the goddess Roma and the shrine of the Unknown Soldier. On the terrace of the Altar of the Fatherland are also the Botticino marble sculptural groups that symbolize the moral values of the Italians, or the ideal principles that make the nation firm. The four groups have a height of 6 m (20 ft) and are to the right and left of the entrance to the terrace of the Altar of the Fatherland (two on each side), sideways to the statues of The Thought and of The Action and in correspondence of the fountains of two seas, along the parapets that overlook Piazza Venezia. The concepts expressed by these four sculptural groups, The Force, The Concord, The Sacrifice and The Right, are the tangible emanation of The Thought and The Action.

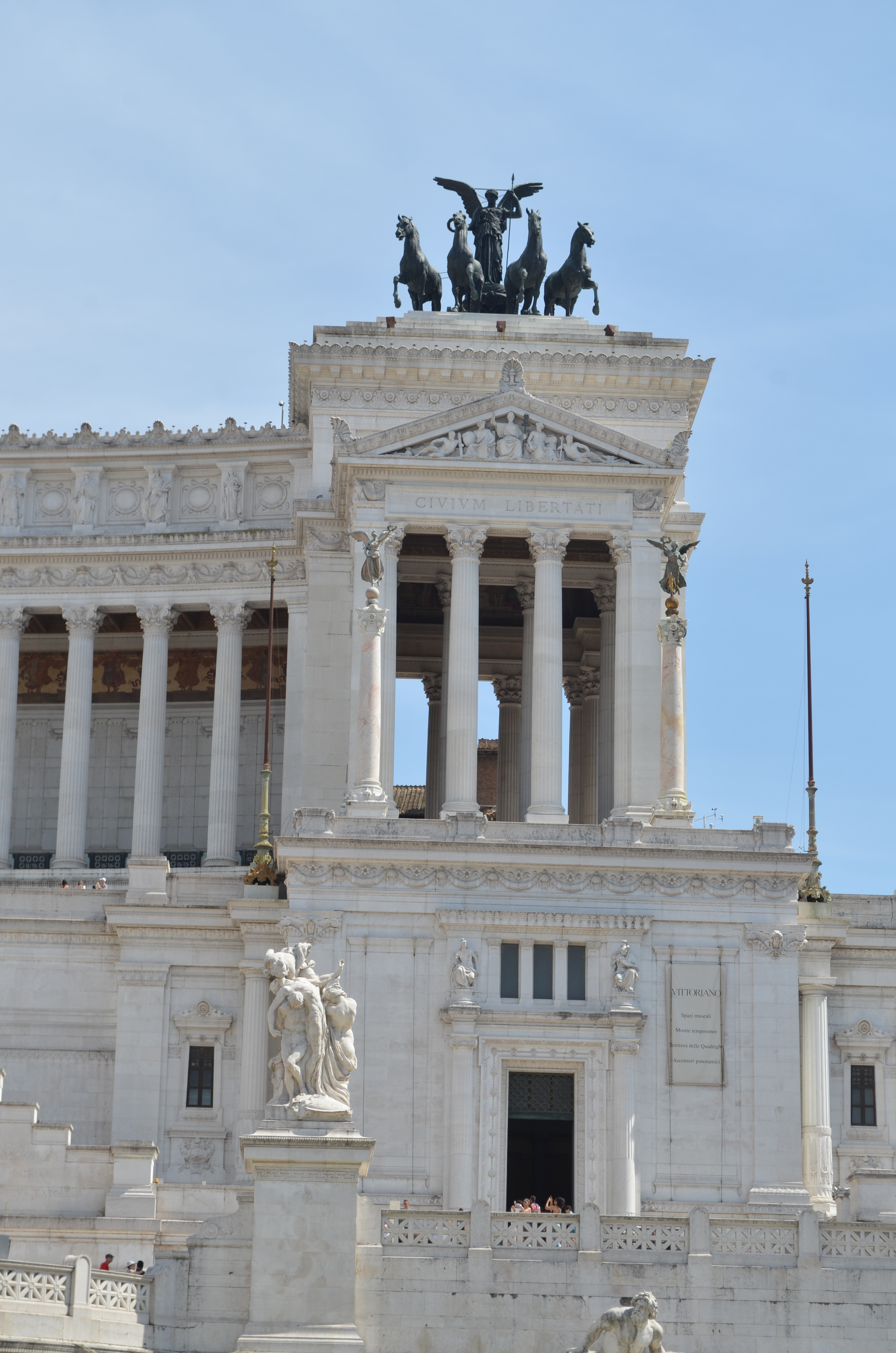
The right propylaeum, dedicated to the freedom of citizens. Under one of the two doors leading to the interior spaces

At the sides of the Altar of the Fatherland, the staircase resumes dividing into two symmetrical ramps parallel to the tomb of the Unknown Soldier. Both reach a pronaos where two large doors open (one on each side, both positioned symmetrically and laterally to the Unknown Soldier, and each in correspondence with one of the two propylaea) that lead to the interior spaces of the Vittoriano. Above each door are two statues; on the left door are The Politics and The Philosophy, while on the right door are two statues depicting The War and The Revolution.

From the two shelves where the doors open to give access to the interior spaces, two further flights of stairs start that converge, directly behind the Altar of the Fatherland, towards the base of the equestrian statue of Victor Emmanuel II – the latter is on the second large elevated platform, in order of height, of the Vittoriano. Behind it, the stairway resumes its ascent in the direction of the portico, reaching a small shelf, from which two staircases start laterally leading to the entrance of a propylaeum. Before reaching the entrances of the propylaea, each of the two staircases is interrupted, creating a small intermediate shelf, which allows access to the terrace of the redeemed cities—the third large and last elevated platform of the Vittoriano—directly behind the equestrian statue of Victor Emmanuel II and immediately below the colonnade of the portico.

The redeemed cities are those united to Italy following the Treaty of Rapallo (1920) and the Treaty of Rome (1924), peace agreements at the end of the First World War. These municipalities are Trieste, Trento, Gorizia, Pola, Fiume and Zara. Following the Paris treaties of 1947, Pola, Fiume and Zara moved on to Yugoslavia and, after the dissolution of the latter, to Croatia. After the conflict, Gorizia was divided into two parts—one part remained in Italy while the other, which was renamed "Nova Gorica", passed first to Yugoslavia and then to Slovenia. Each redeemed city is represented by an altar against the back wall, which bears the corresponding municipal coat of arms. The six altars were placed on the terrace between 1929 and 1930.

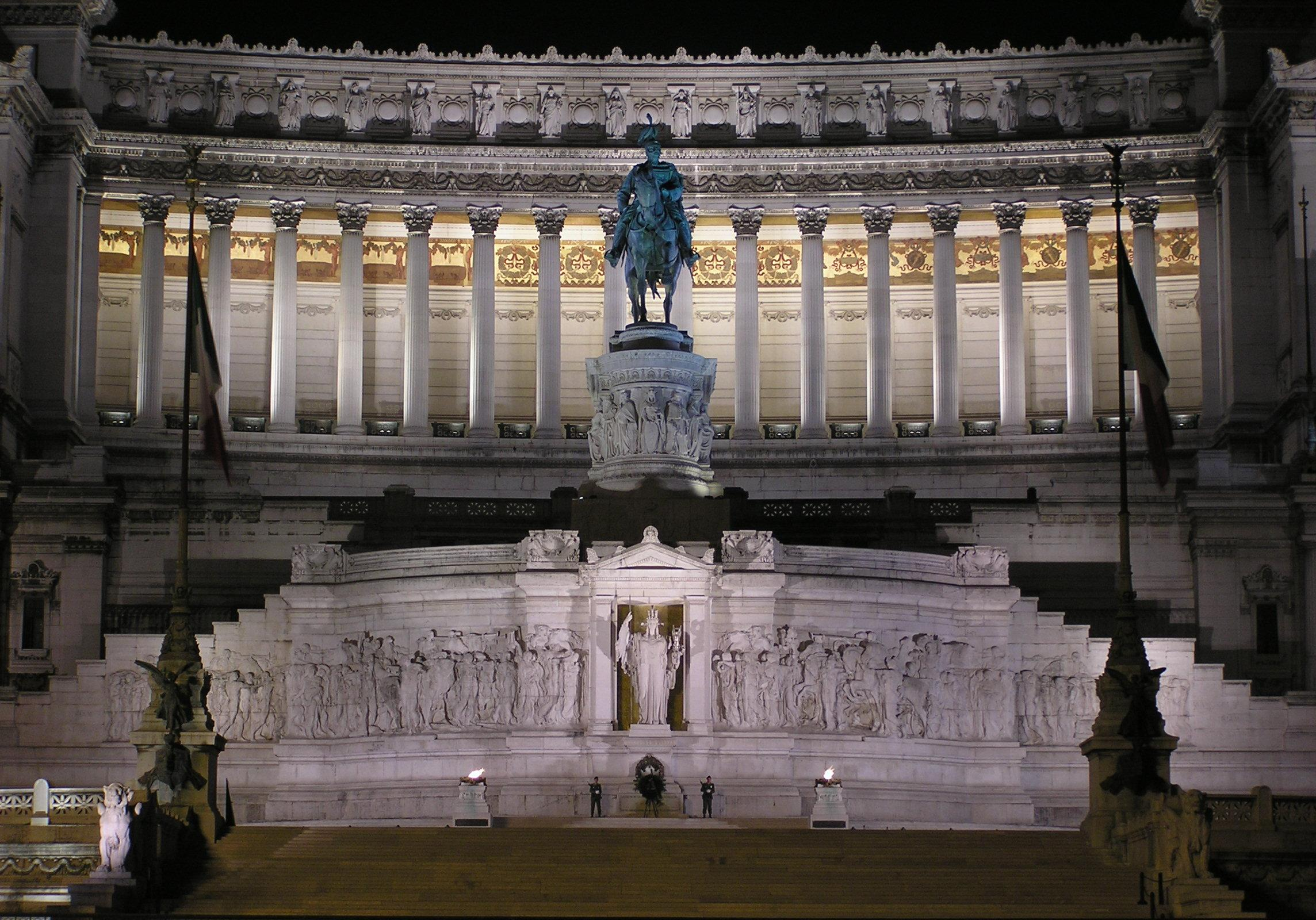
The colonnade of the portico illuminated in a night photo

At the centre of the row of altars of the redeemed cities, engraved on the stylobate, is a monumental inscription carved on the occasion of the solemn ceremony of the Unknown Soldier (4 November 1921) which contains the text of the Victory Bulletin, an official document written after the Armistice of Villa Giusti with which the general Armando Diaz, supreme commander of the Royal Army, announced, on 4 November 1918, the surrender of the Austro-Hungarian Empire and the victory of Italy in the First World War.

At the base of the text of the Victory Bulletin are two other altars similar to those of the redeemed cities but which have, instead of the municipal coat of arms of the municipalities, a helmet—these two altars bear the inscription "Et Facere Fortia" on the left alter and "Et Pati Fortia" on the right alter. They echo the Latin phrase et facere et pati fortia Romanum est ("It is the attribute of a Roman to perform as well as to suffer mighty things") written by Livy in the History of Rome, book 11; in the work the phrase is pronounced by Scaevola towards Lars Porsena.

=== Altar of the Fatherland ===
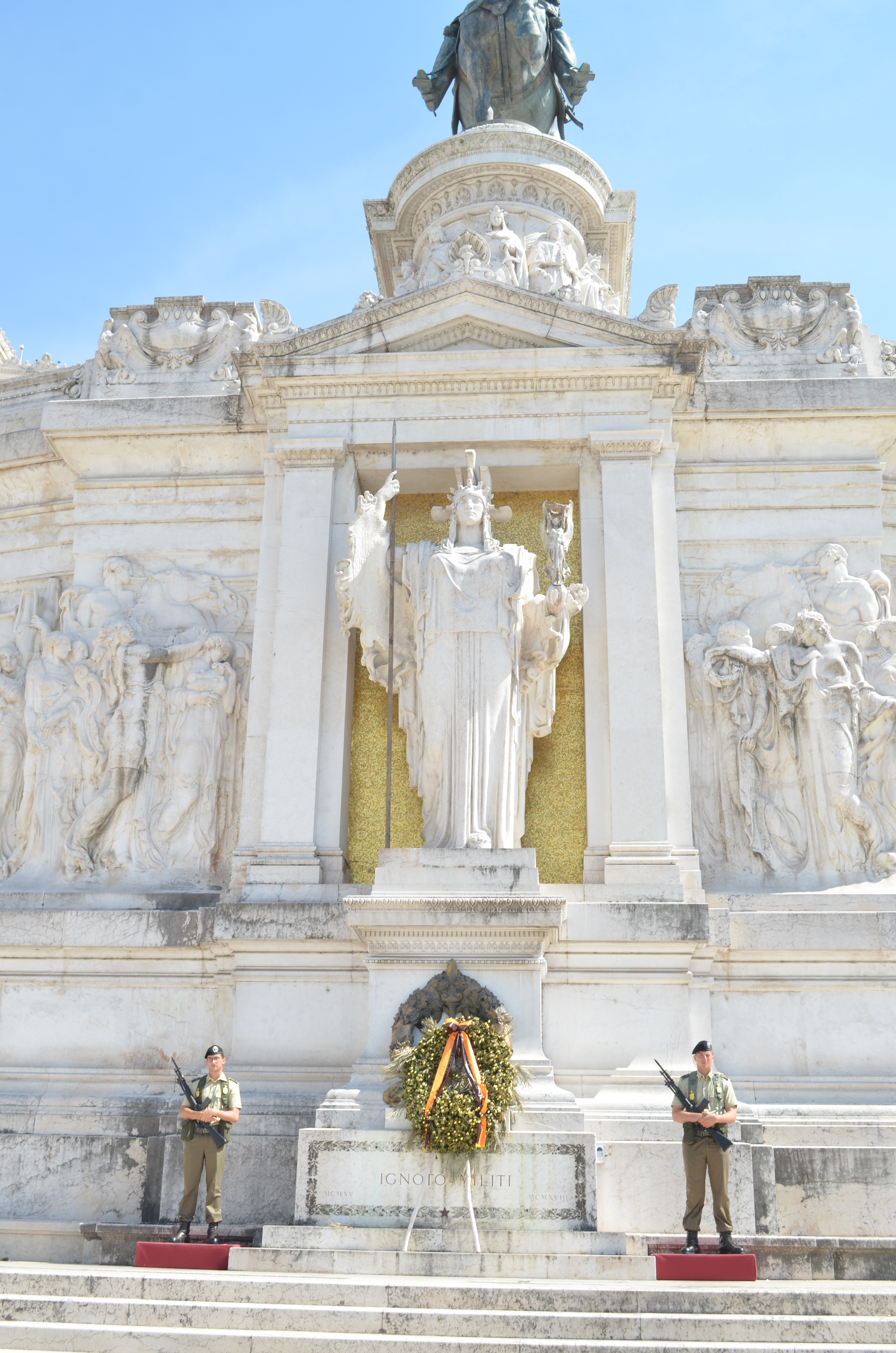
The Altar of the Fatherland, symbolic centre of the Vittoriano, with the Tomb of the Unknown Soldier. Above the statue of goddess Roma is the equestrian statue of Victor Emmanuel II of Savoy, the first king of a unified Italy

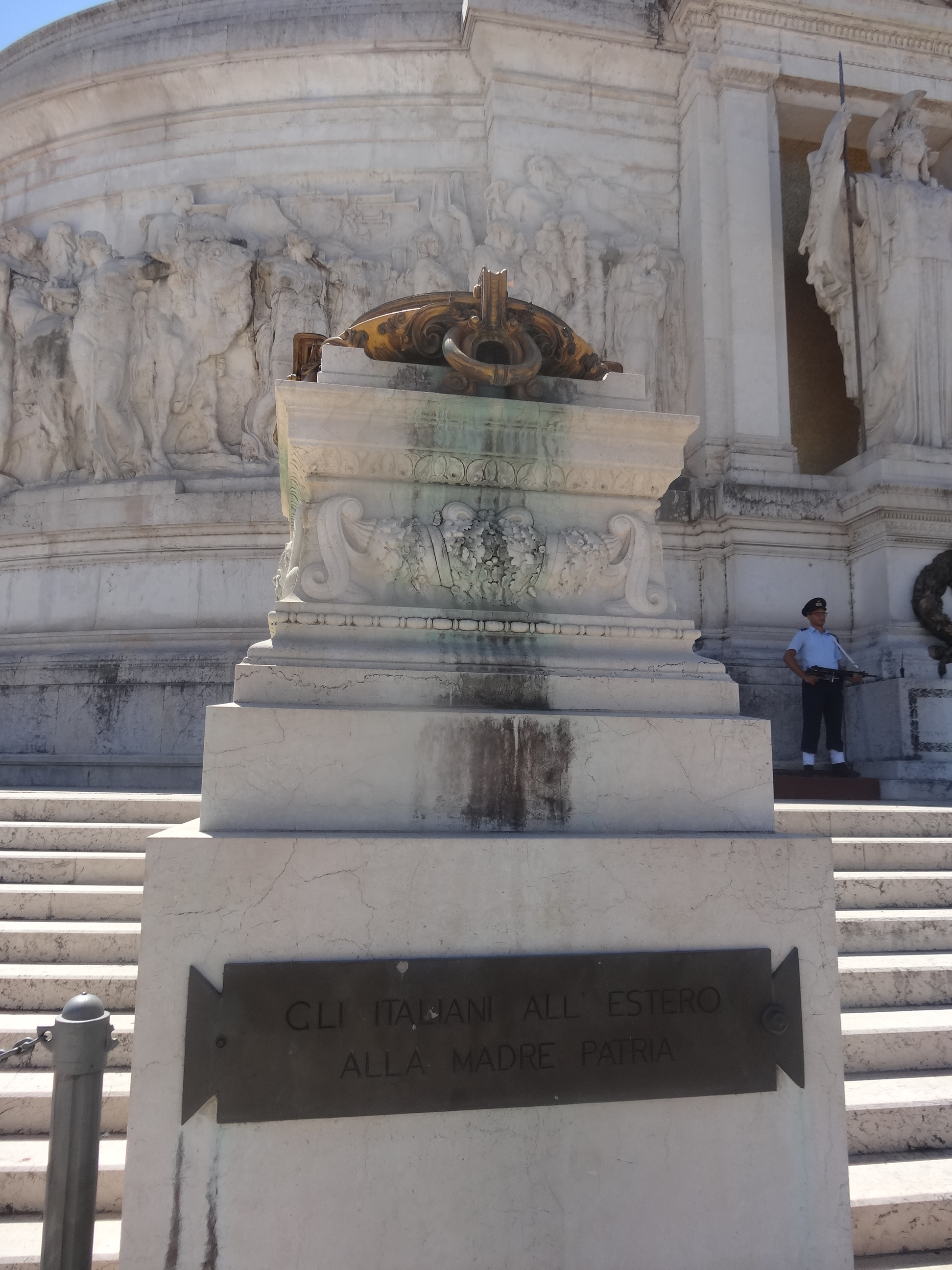
One of the two braziers that burn perpetually on the sides of the tomb of the Unknown Soldier. At their base is a plaque bearing the inscription "Gli italiani all'estero alla Madre Patria" ("Italians abroad to the Motherland")

The Altar of the Fatherland is the most famous part of the Vittoriano and is the one with which it is often identified. On the top of the entrance stairway, it was designed by the Brescian sculptor Angelo Zanelli, who won a competition specially held in 1906. It is formed from the side of the Tomb of Italian Unknown Soldier that faces the outside of the building (the other side, which faces inside the Vittoriano, is in a crypt), from the sacellum of the statue of the goddess Roma (which is exactly above the tomb of the Unknown Soldier) and two vertical marble reliefs that descend from the edges of the aedicula containing the statue of the goddess Roma and which run downwards laterally to the tomb of the Unknown Soldier.

The statue of the goddess Roma present at the Vittoriano interrupted a custom in vogue until the 19th century, by which the representation of this subject was with exclusively warlike traits. Angelo Zanelli, in his work, decided to further characterize the statue by also providing the reference to Athena, Greek goddess of wisdom and the arts, as well as of war. The great statue of the deity emerges from a golden background. The presence of the goddess Roma in the Vittoriano underlines the irremissible will of the Unification of Italy patriots to have Rome as the capital of Italy, an essential concept, according to the common feeling, from the history of the peninsula and the islands of Italian culture.

The general conception of the bas-reliefs, beside the statue of the goddess Roma, one to her left and the other to her right, recalls Virgil's Bucolics and Georgics, which complete the triptych of the Altar of the Fatherland with the statue of the Roman divinity.

The allegorical meaning of the bas-reliefs that are inspired by the works of Virgil is linked to the desire to conceptually render the Italian soul. In the Georgics, the reference to the Aeneid is in fact present, and in both the works the industriousness in the work of the Italians is recalled.

The bas-relief on the left of the Altar of the Fatherland represents the Triumph of Labour and the one on the right symbolizes the Triumph of the Patriotic Love where both converge scenically towards the statue of the goddess Roma.

=== Equestrian statue of Victor Emmanuel II ===
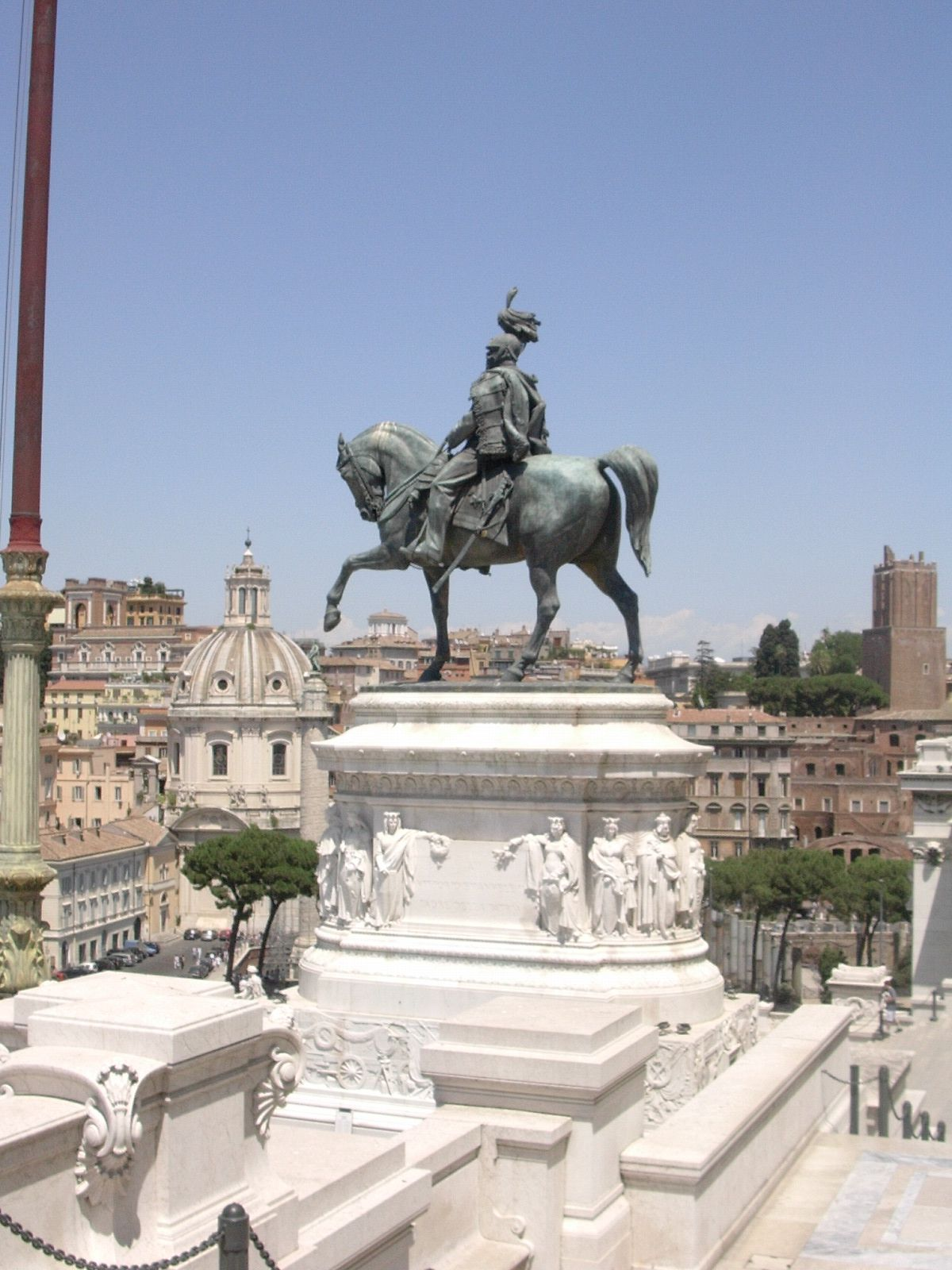
The equestrian statue of Victor Emmanuel II, architectural centre of the Vittoriano, whose marble base the statues of the Italian noble cities are carved

After the Altar of the Fatherland is the equestrian statue of Victor Emmanuel II, a bronze work by Enrico Chiaradia and architectural centre of the Vittoriano.

=== Statues of noble cities ===
On the base of the equestrian statue of Victor Emmanuel II are sculptural depictions of 14 Italian noble cities, or rather the capitals of Italian states founded before the Savoy monarchy.

They are not the statues of the most important cities in Italy, but of those that were once capitals of ancient Italian pre-unification monarchies, all of which are precedent and therefore historically converging towards the Savoy monarchy—for this reason they are considered "mothers noble"s of Unification of Italy.

The 14 sculptural representations of the noble cities are deliberately placed at the base of the equestrian statue of Victor Emmanuel II, which metaphorically symbolizes the nature of historical foundations of Italy. In a broader sense, they also represent the concept that the unity of the homeland, as a whole, rests on a basis constituted by the municipalities. Unlike those dedicated to the regions of Italy, the statues depicting the 14 cities are all the work of the same sculptor, Eugenio Maccagnani.

=== Portico and propylaea ===
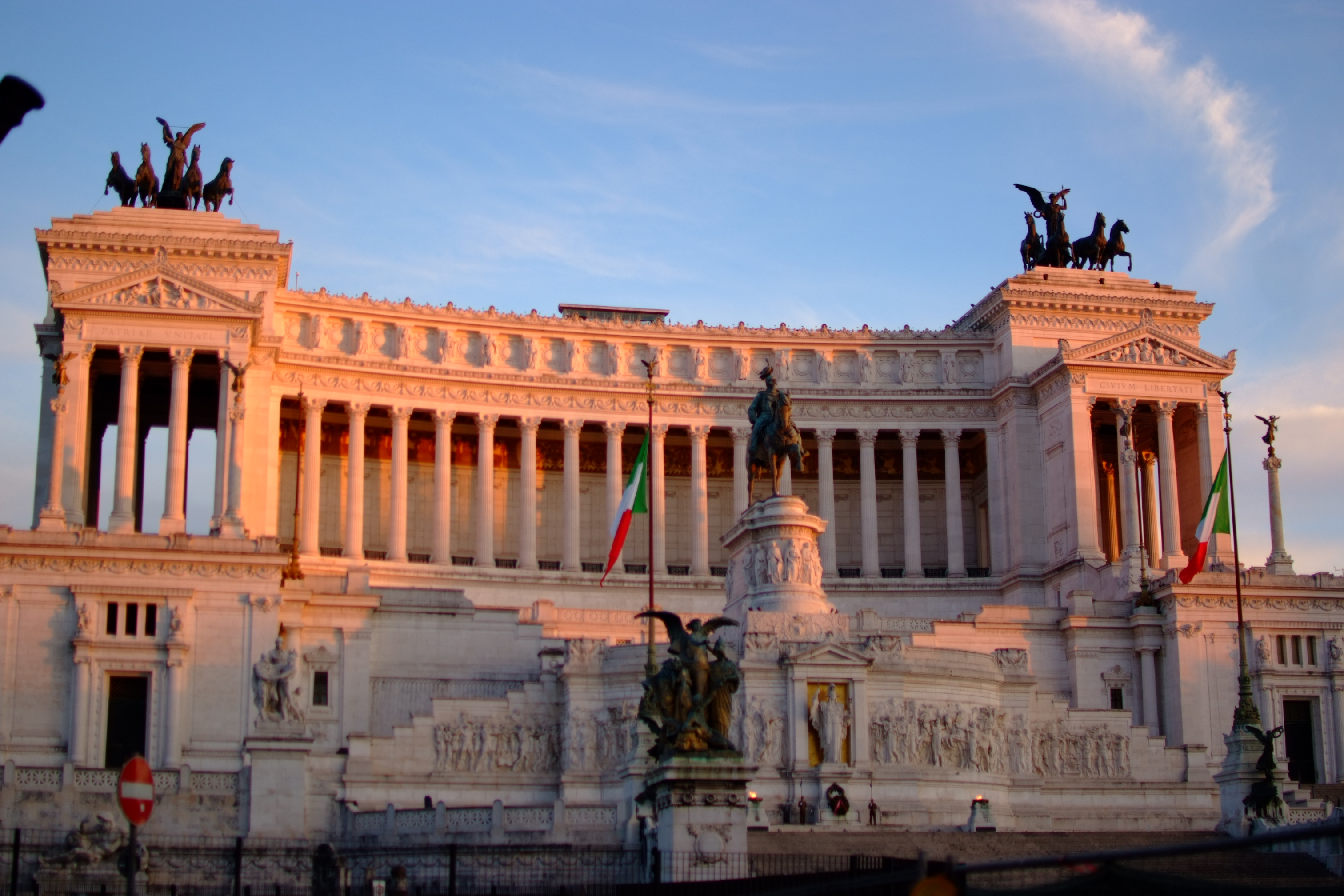
The Vittoriano at sunset showing the propylaea and the quadrigas

Continuing to climb the stairway beyond the equestrian statue of Victor Emmnauel II, is the most imposing and striking architectonic element—the large portico with Corinthian-style columns, slightly curved, on the top of the monument, and inserted between two temple propylaea called "sommoportico" due to its elevated position. The propylaea are the two small porticos projecting from the portico, at its lateral (side) ends, that constitute the entrances.

The portico is 72 m (236 ft) long and is centrally supported by 16 15 m (49 ft) tall columns surmounted by Corinthian capitals, embellished by the face of the Italia turrita (at centre) and acanthus leaves. The cornice above the colonnade is instead decorated with statues representing the 16 allegorical personifications of the Italian regions where each statue corresponds to a column. Giuseppe Sacconi was inspired by the Temple of Castor and Pollux in the Roman Forum nearby.

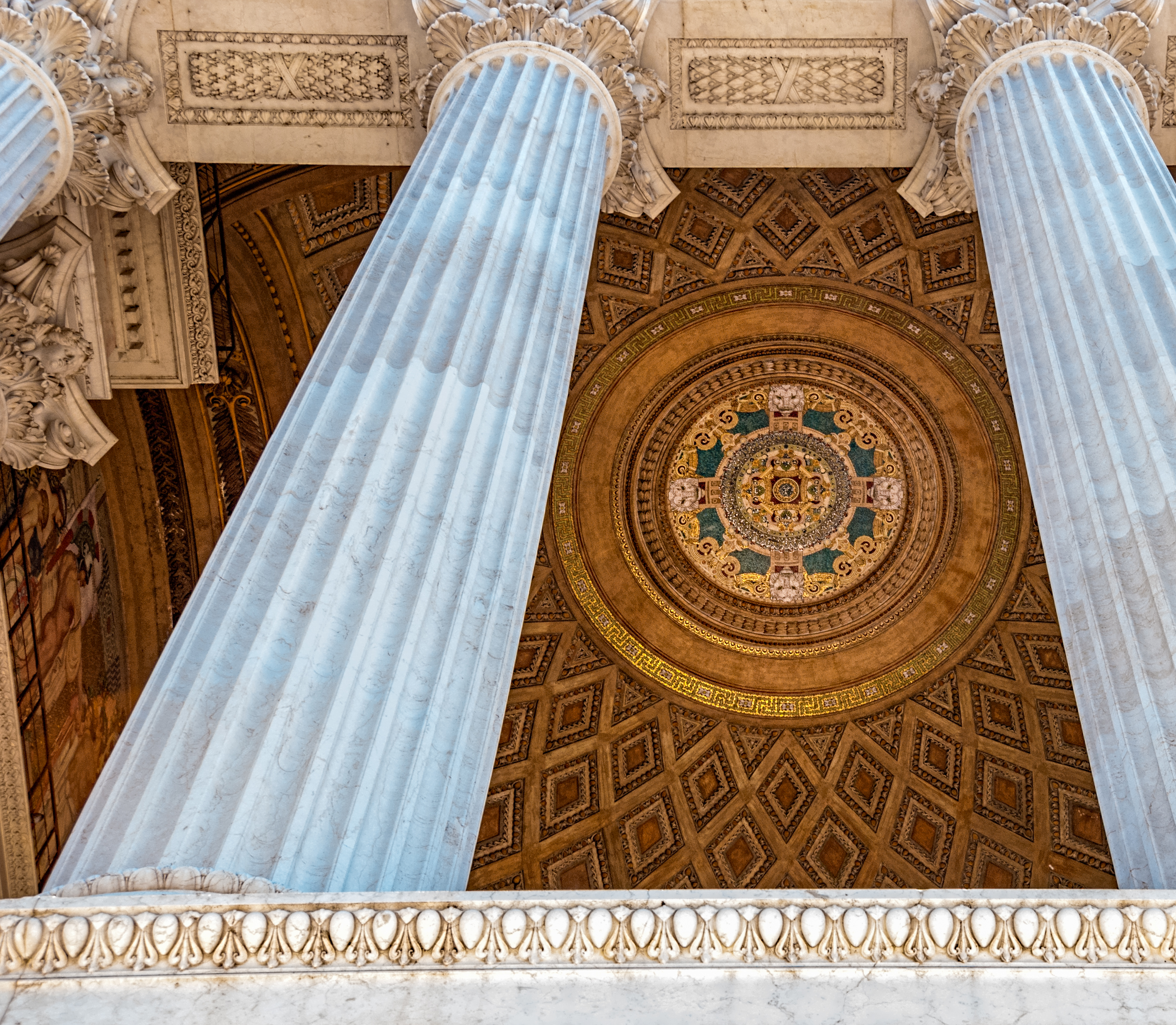
A part of the interior decorations of the ceiling of one of the propylaea

Each propylaeum has a bronze statue depicting quadrigae, each one hosting a Winged Victory. The architectural and expressive synergies of the triumphal arches are thus re-proposed—the allegorical meaning of the "quadriga", since ancient times, is in fact that of success. This concept is reinforced by the presence of the Winged Victories, messengers descended from heaven by the divinities who flank the winner of a military battle as their favourite.

The two quadrigae, as the Latin inscriptions placed on the pediments of the underlying propylaea expressly declare, symbolize the freedom of the citizens ("Civium Libertati", right) and the unity of the homeland ("Patriae Unitati", left), the two concepts pivots that inform the entire monument and are attributed to the sovereign Victor Emmanuel II. The implicit message is that Italy, once again a single political group and gained independence, leaving behind the glories of Rome and the pomp of the papal court, is ready to spread a new Italian Renaissance articulated on the moral virtues represented allegorically in the Vittoriano.

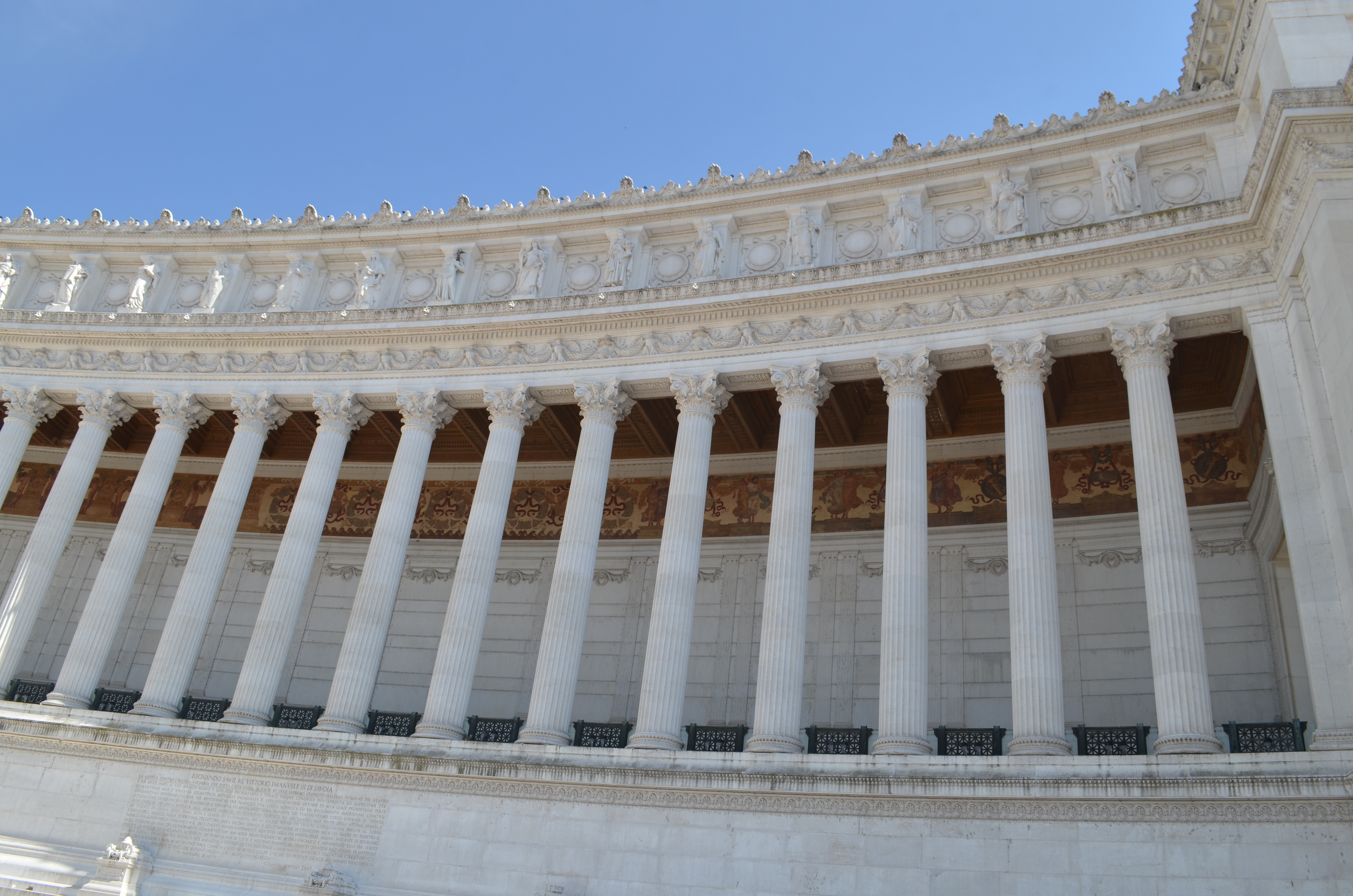
View of the internal decorations of the front wall to the colonnade of the portico. Above the pediment of the colonnade statues of the Italian regions can be seen

The concepts "freedom of citizens" and "unity of the homeland" also summarize the fundamental themes that characterized the beginning and the end of the contribution given by Victor Emmanuel II to the Unification of Italy. Having ascended the throne for a few months, he published the proclamation of Moncalieri (20 November 1849) which confirmed the survival of the liberal regime even in the repressive period following the wave of revolutions of 1848. His political work had ended with the capture of Rome (20 September 1870), which became the capital, although the unification of Trentino-Alto Adige and Julian March (annexed only in 1919 after the First World War) were still missing. The quadrigas, already planned in the original project, were built and positioned in 1927. Inside the pediments of the two propylaea are sculptural groups that have the same theme as the respective quadrigas above.

The interiors of the portico and the propylaea can be accessed through two triumphal entrance stairways of each propylaeum. These are on a small shelf that can be reached via a short staircase that joins the terrace of the redeemed cities. At the base of the entrance stairway of the propylaea are four statues of Winged Victories on triumphal columns, made in 1911 – two are at the entrance to the right propylea, and two at the entrance to the left propylea.

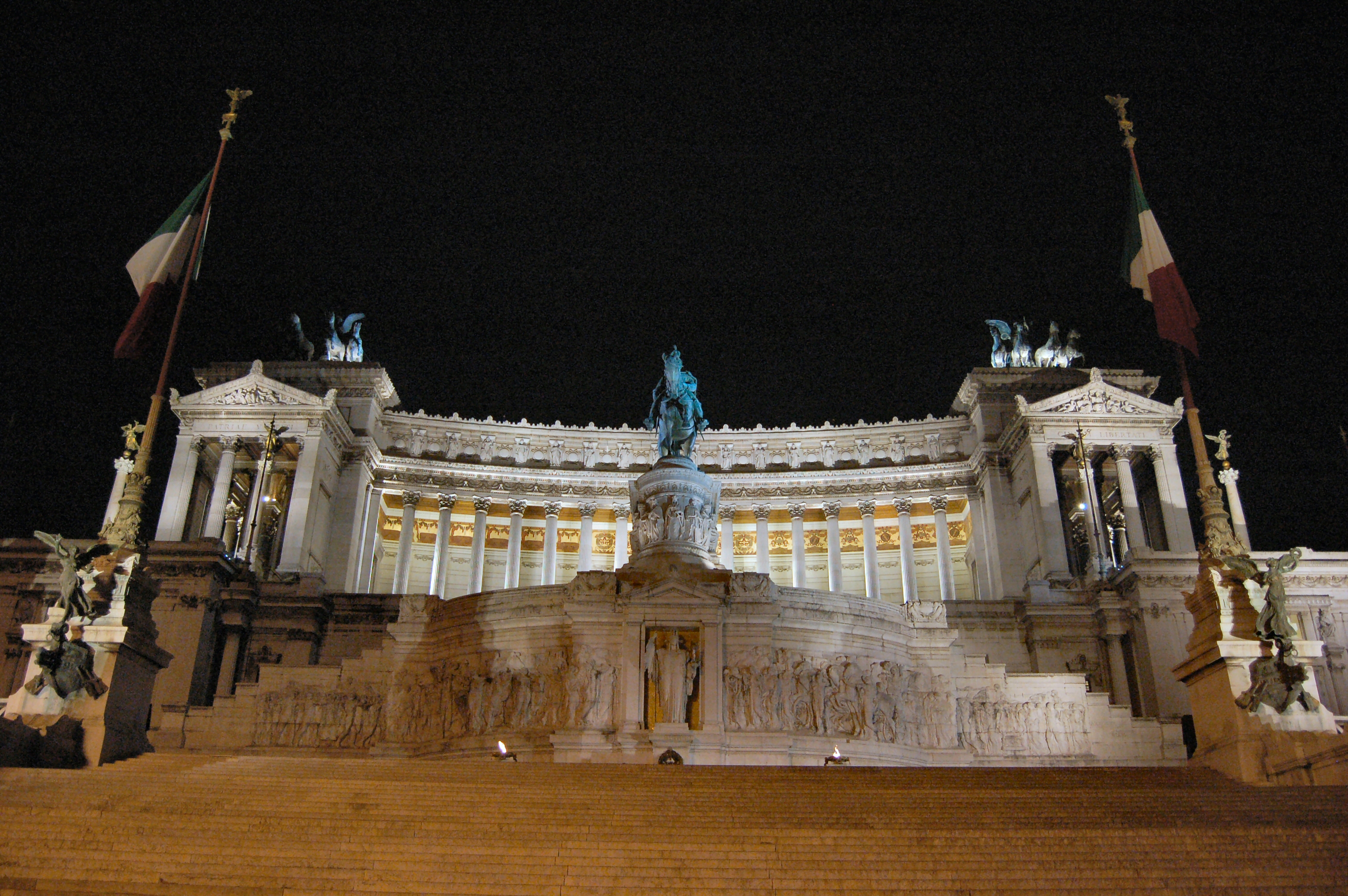
The Vittoriano seen at night

Each entrance leads to a large quadrangular vestibule, in dialogue with the outside due to a colonnade, and from the vestibules one enters the interior spaces of the portico. These rooms are decorated with mosaics, important works of floral Liberty and pictorial symbolism, which cover the lunettes and the two domes of the propylaea. Even the mosaics have as their subject the metaphorical representation of virtues and feelings, very often rendered as allegorical personifications, which animated Italians during the unification of Italy. The interiors of the portico are decorated with the allegories of the sciences, while the doors that connect the propylaea and the portico are embellished with depictions on the arts.

The decoration of the ceiling of the left propylaeum was entrusted to Giulio Bargellini; in these mosaics he adopted innovative technical devices, such as the use of materials of various kinds and tiles of different sizes and inclined so as to create studied reflections of light, and where the lines of the mosaic representations continue towards those of the columns below. The mosaics of Bargellini, along the highest part of the walls, represent figuratively The Faith, The Force, The Work and The Wisdom. The decoration of the ceiling of the right propylaeum was instead entrusted to Antonio Rizzi. Rizzi dedicated himself, along the highest part of the vertical walls, to The Law, The Value, The Peace, The Union and The Poetry.

The internal doors leading from the two propylaea to the portico are decorated with allegorical sculptures representing The Architecture and The Music, which are found in the vestibule on the left and which are the work of Antonio Garella, and The Painting and The Sculpture, in the vestibule on the right and which were made by Lio Gangeri. The interior of the portico has a polychrome marble floor and a Coffered ceiling—the latter of which was designed by Gaetano Koch, is called the "ceiling of the sciences".

The ceiling owes its name to the bronze sculptures of Giuseppe Tonnini placed inside the portico, collectively known as The Allegories of The Sciences. They are all made up of female personifications: The Geometry, The Chemistry, The Physics, The Mineralogy, The Mechanics, The Astronomy and The Geography. The vertical wall opposite the columns is decorated at the top with mosaics at gilded backgrounds, after 1925. Other sculptures present inside the portico are the trophy of arms—a vast set of shields, cuirasses, halberds, spears, flags, arrows and quivers in a trophy the crown of Italy is shown, along with the eagle with the crusader shield and the collar of the Annunciation (emblems of the House of Savoy).

=== Statues of the regions ===
The staircase leading to the terrace of the redeemed cities is the best point of observation of the statues of the Italian regions, since the latter are found on the cornice of the portico, each in correspondence of a column. The presence of metaphorically depicting statues of the Italian regions is inspired by the allegorical personifications of the Roman provinces, often placed on commemorative monuments during the imperial era. The number of statues placed on the top of the portico is equal to 16, given that at the time of the drafting of the construction project, 16 Italian regions were identified. Each statue is 5 m (16 ft) high and was entrusted to a different sculptor who were almost always native to the region of which he would have carved the image. The cornice is also embellished with friezes consisting of eagles and lion heads.

=== Internal crypt of the Unknown Soldier ===
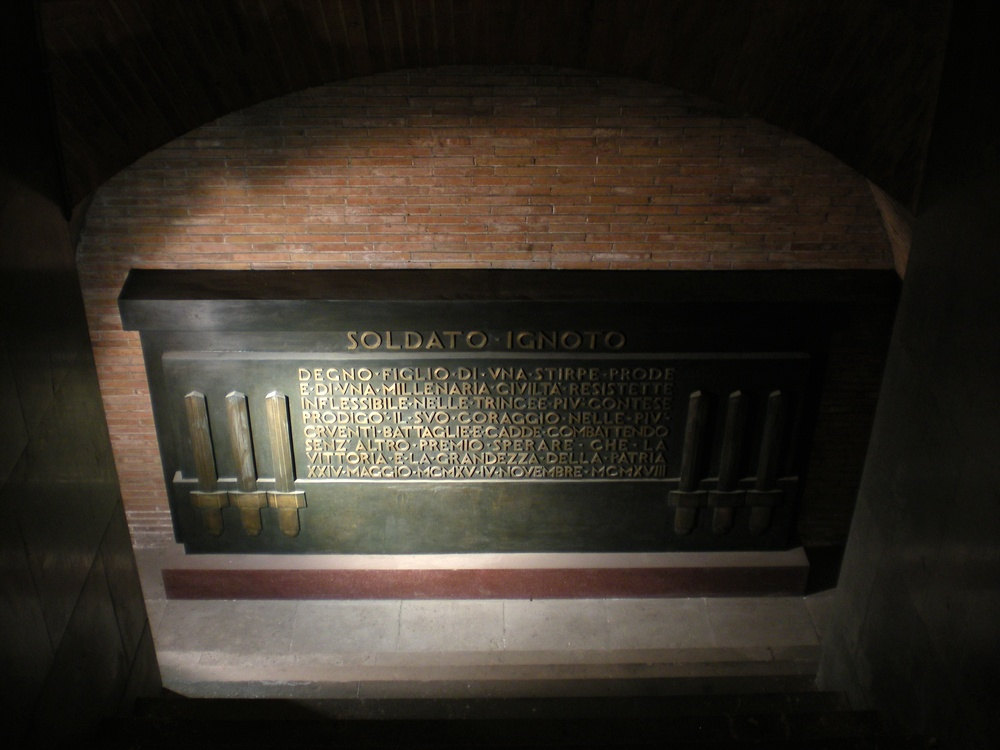
The Tomb of the Unknown Soldier visible from the internal crypt

The crypt of the Italian Unknown Soldier is under the equestrian statue of Victor Emmanuel II which can be accessed from the Shrine of the Flags museum, from where it is possible to see the side of the shrine of the Soldier that faces inwards. It is thus by the Altar of the Fatherland, from where the outward side of the tomb is seen.

The crypt of the Unknown Soldier is the work of the architect Armando Brasini. It is a room in the shape of a Greek cross with a domed vault which is accessed via two flights of stairs. A short tunnel starts from the crypt and reaches the niche of the chapel of the Unknown Soldier. The niche is inserted in an arcosolium inspired by the style of early Christian buildings, especially the catacombs. The ceiling of the crypt instead recalls the Roman architecture, alternating cross vaults and barrel vaults. The room, built using bricks, is characterized by the presence of round arches and niches. There is also a small altar for religious services.

The walls of the crypt are decorated with a mosaic of Byzantine style, by Giulio Bargellini, of a religious nature. The crucifixion of Jesus is above the tomb of the Unknown Soldier, where, on the walls, stand the patron saints of the Italian Armed Forces: Saint Martin patron of the infantry, Saint George of the cavalry, Saint Sebastian of the local police and Saint Barbara of the Italian Navy, artillery and military engineers. Finally, in the dome, is the Madonna of Loreto, patron saint of the Italian Air Force.

Parts of the crypt and sepulcher were made with stone materials from the mountains that were the scene of battles of the First World War, with the floor made of Karst marble, and the small altar made from a single block of stone from Monte Grappa.

== Museums ==
Inside the Vittoriano are some museums dedicated to the history of Italy, especially the Unification of Italy ("Risorgimento"): the Central Museum of the Risorgimento (Italian: Museo Centrale del Risorgimento) with an adjoining study institute, the Flag of Italy Memorial (Italian: Sacrario delle bandiere) and an area that hosts temporary exhibitions of artistic interest, historical, sociological and cultural called "ala Brasini".

Since 2020, together with Palazzo Venezia, it has been managed by the VIVE Institute, one of the eleven institutes of significant general interest of the Italian Ministry of Culture.

Access to the Central Museum of the Risorgimento is on the left side of the monument, at the back of the Santa Maria in Ara Coeli along via di San Pietro in Carcere. The period of Italian history between the end of the 18th century and the First World War is displayed by memorabilia, paintings, sculptures, documents (letters, diaries and manuscripts), drawings, engravings, weapons and prints.

On the entrance stairway of the Central Museum of the Risorgimento are visible engravings related to some significant episodes for the birth of the Risorgimento movement, from the seed thrown by the French Revolution to the Napoleonic Wars, to better frame and remember the national history included between the reform of the ancient Italian states and the end of the First World War. Along the walls, other marble engravings show some pieces of texts enunciated by prominent personalities, which better testify and describe this part of Italian history.

The Central Museum of the Risorgimento also includes the Shrine of the Flags, a museum where the war flags of dissolved military units and decommissioned ships from the Italian Army, Italian Air Force, Italian Navy, Carabinieri, Polizia di Stato, Penitentiary Police and Guardia di Finanza are collected and temporarily stored. In case a unit is reformed, the flags are retrieved by the unit. Access to the shrine is along Via dei Fori Imperiali, where memorabilia, relating mainly to the Risorgimento wars, in which the Italian Armed Forces took part, are also kept.

The "ala Brasini", reserved for temporary exhibitions, is dedicated to Armando Brasini, the main promoter of the Central Museum. The wing has three exhibition rooms: the "large exhibition hall", with a surface area of 700 m^{2} (7,535 sq ft), generally hosts art exhibitions, and those that require more space, the "central hall" of 400 m^{2} (4,306 sq ft) and the "jubilee hall" of 150 m^{2} (1,615 sq ft), are used.

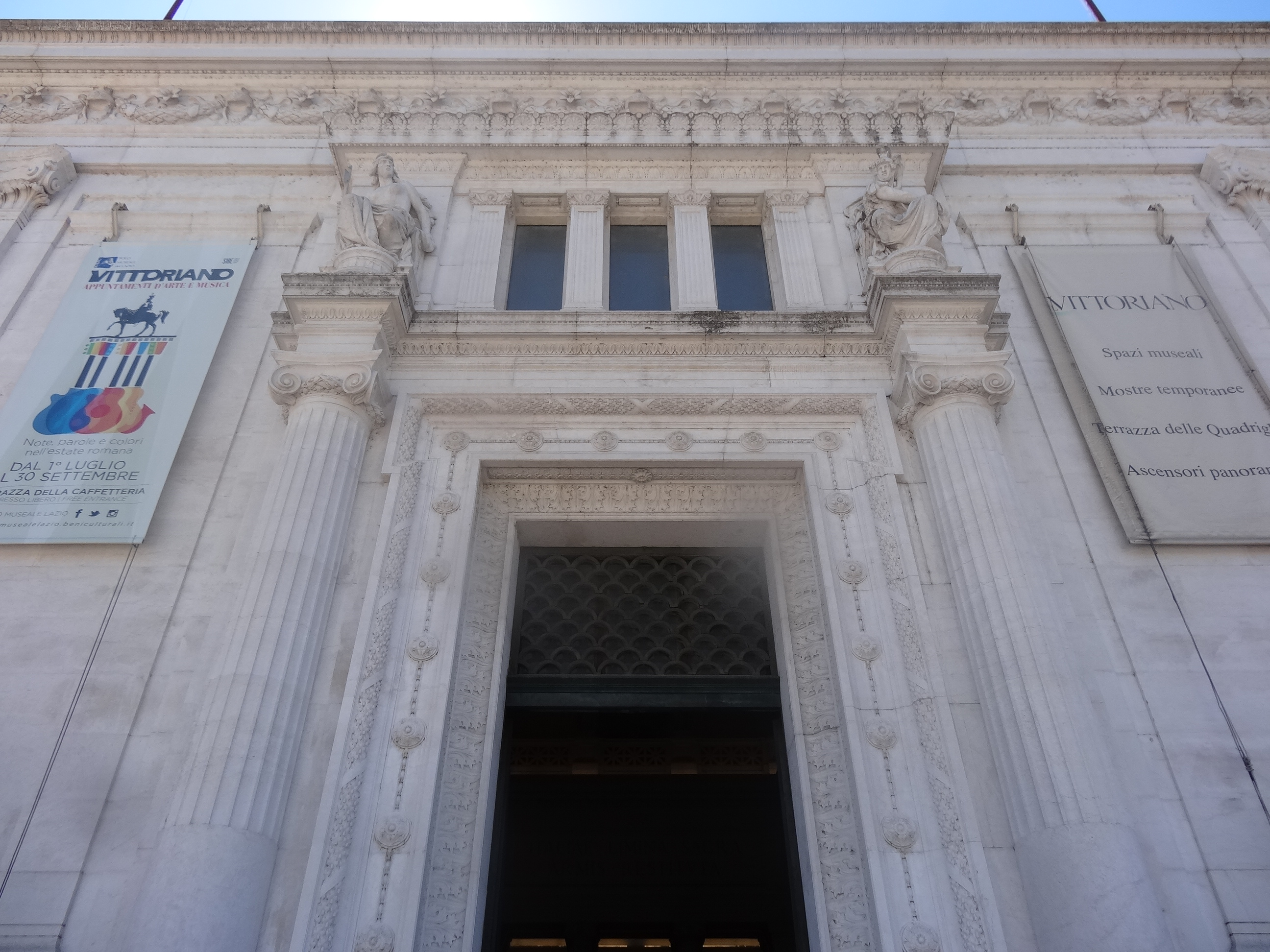
One of the two gates to the propylaea, a gateway to the internal exhibition spaces

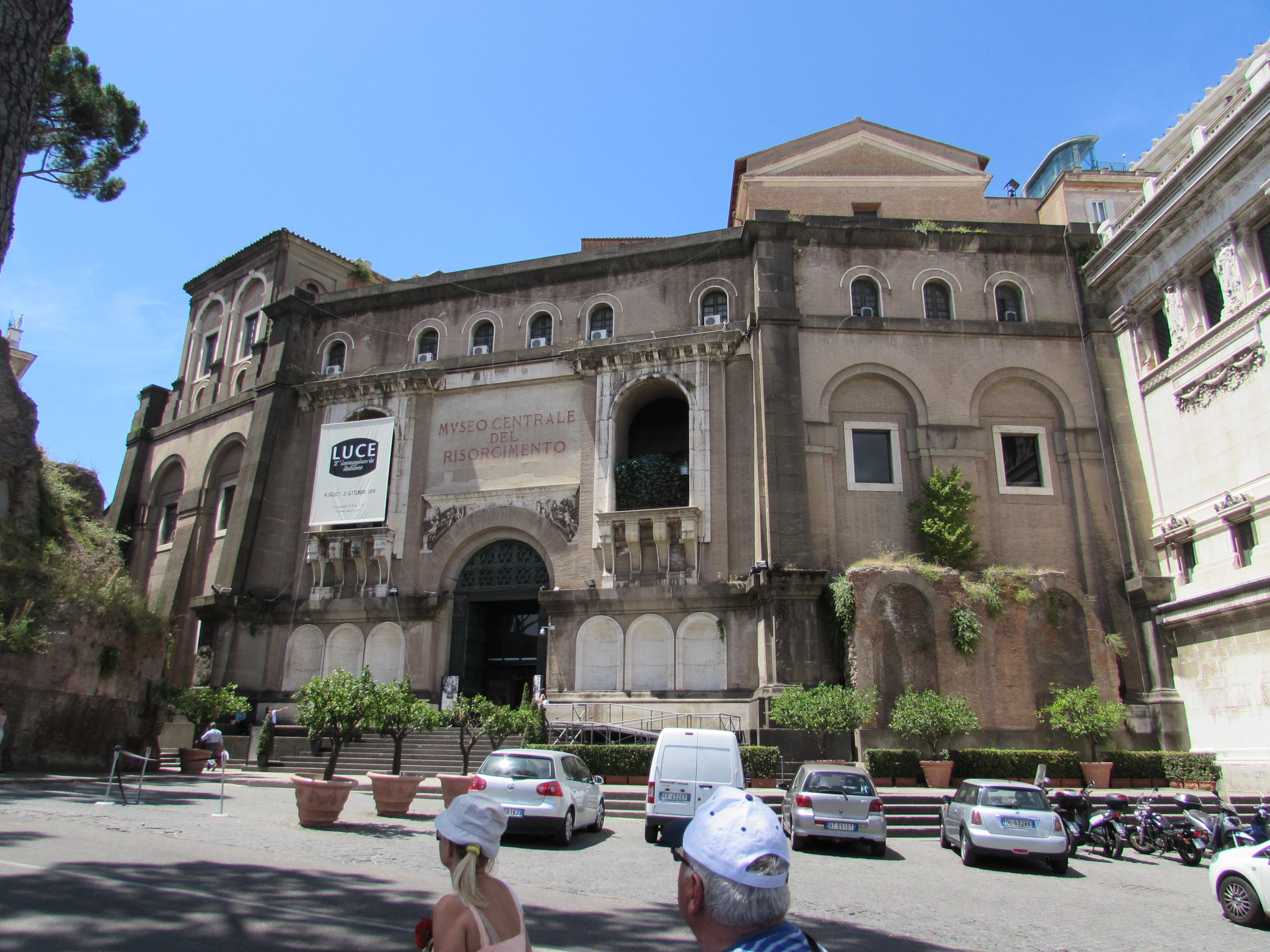
Entrance to the Central Museum of the Risorgimento from via di San Pietro in Carcere

== See also ==
- Tomb of Gaius Publicius Bibulus

| Preceded by Fontana del Tritone, Rome | Landmarks of Rome; Victor Emmanuel II Monument | Succeeded by Tomb of the Unknown Soldier (Italy) |
