= Equestrian statue of Victor Emmanuel II, Rome =

Sculpture in Italy

Equestrian statue of Victor Emmanuel II
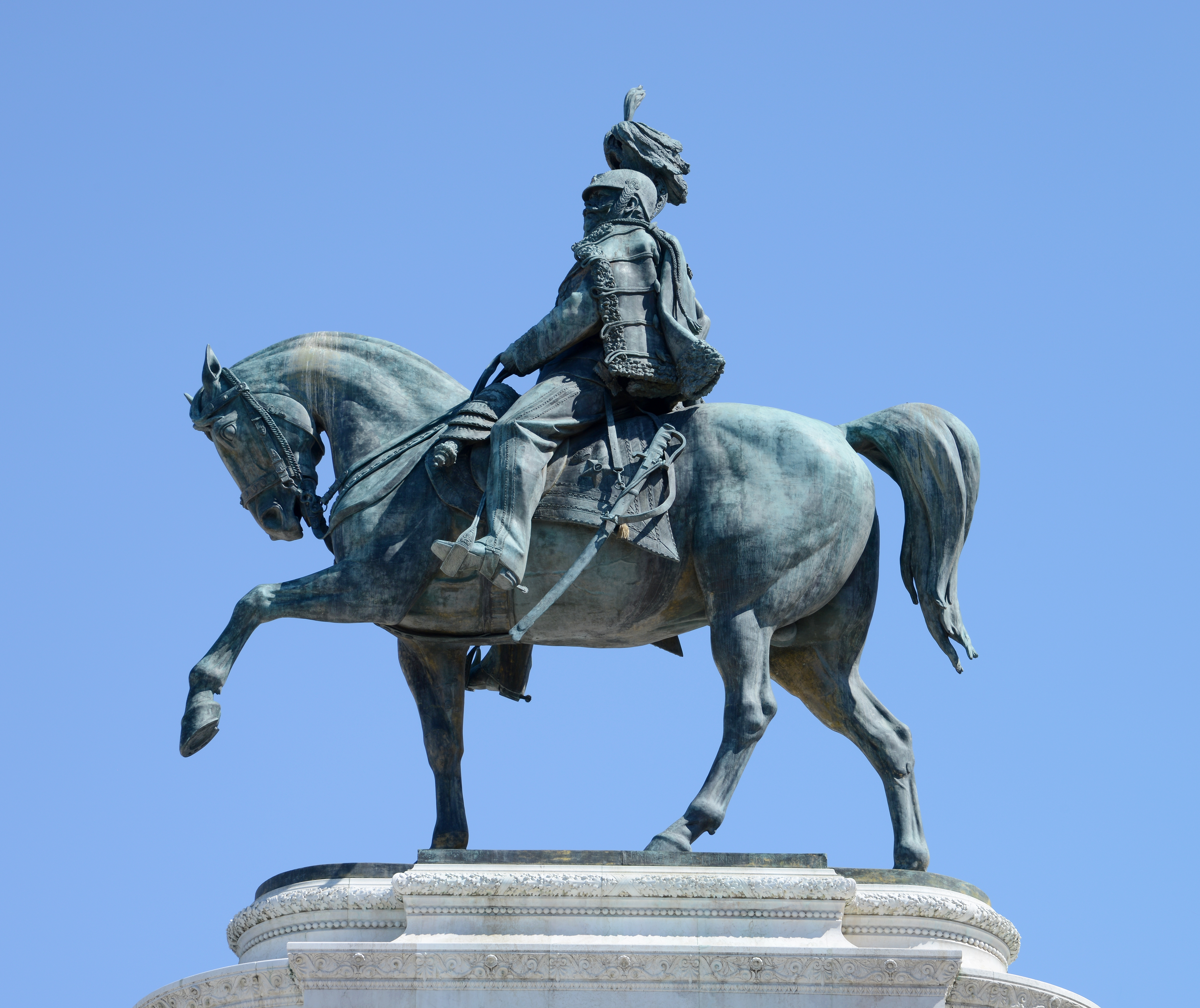
- The statue in 2015
- Medium: Bronze (statue); granite (base)
- Location: Rome, Italy

An equestrian statue of Victor Emmanuel II is installed at the Victor Emmanuel II Monument in Rome, Italy. The bronze sculpture was designed by Friulian sculptor Enrico Chiaradia and completed by Florentine artist Emilio Gallori.

== Description and history ==
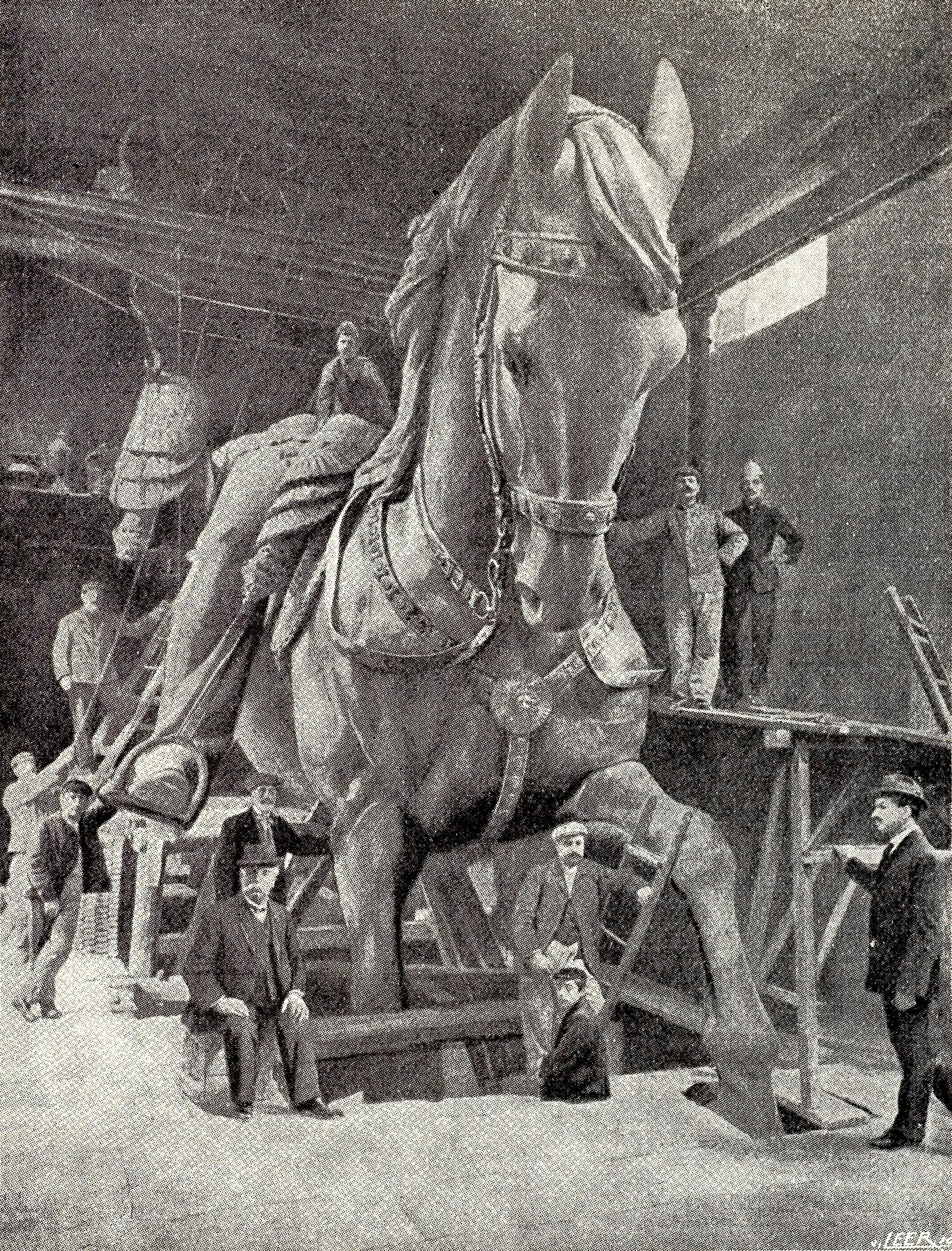
The sculpture in 1909

After the Altar of the Fatherland is the equestrian statue of Victor Emmanuel II, a bronze work by Enrico Chiaradia and architectural centre of the Vittoriano. The personifications of the noble Italian cities are carved on the marble base of the statue. The statue is bronze, 12 m (39 ft) high, 10 m (33 ft) long, and weighs 50 tons. Including the marble base, the entire sculptural group is 24.80 m (81 ft) high.

The equestrian statue of Victor Emmanuel II is the only non-symbolic representation of the Vittoriano, given that it is the representation of the homonymous monarch. In classical antiquity the equestrian statues were aimed at the exaltation of the portrayed subject, whose warlike virtues were emphasized. Furthermore, riding and controlling a steed, the character's ability to control primordial instincts was communicated—in this way, the subject was also recognized as civic virtues.

The statue being at the architectural centre of the Vittoriano, above the Altar of the Fatherland and in front of the colonnade of the portico, is not fortuitous – in classical antiquity such equestrian statues were often in front of colonnades, public squares, temples or along the triumphal streets; in places, therefore, stressing centrality. The presence of the basement on which the personifications of the noble cities are carved is linked to the same archaic traditions.

Carved on the plinth are personifications of fourteen noble cities, created by Eugenio Maccagnani, a sculptor much appreciated by Sacconi. Maccagnani also decorated the lower part of the plinth with symbols of the armed forces victorious in the wars of the Risorgimento: the Engineer Corps, Navy, Artillery, and Cavalry; the obvious source of inspiration are the similar reliefs of the nearby Trajan's Column.

== See also ==
- Architectural and artistic works of the Vittoriano
- List of equestrian statues in Italy
