= Tomb of Gaius Publicius Bibulus =

Monument in Rome, Italy

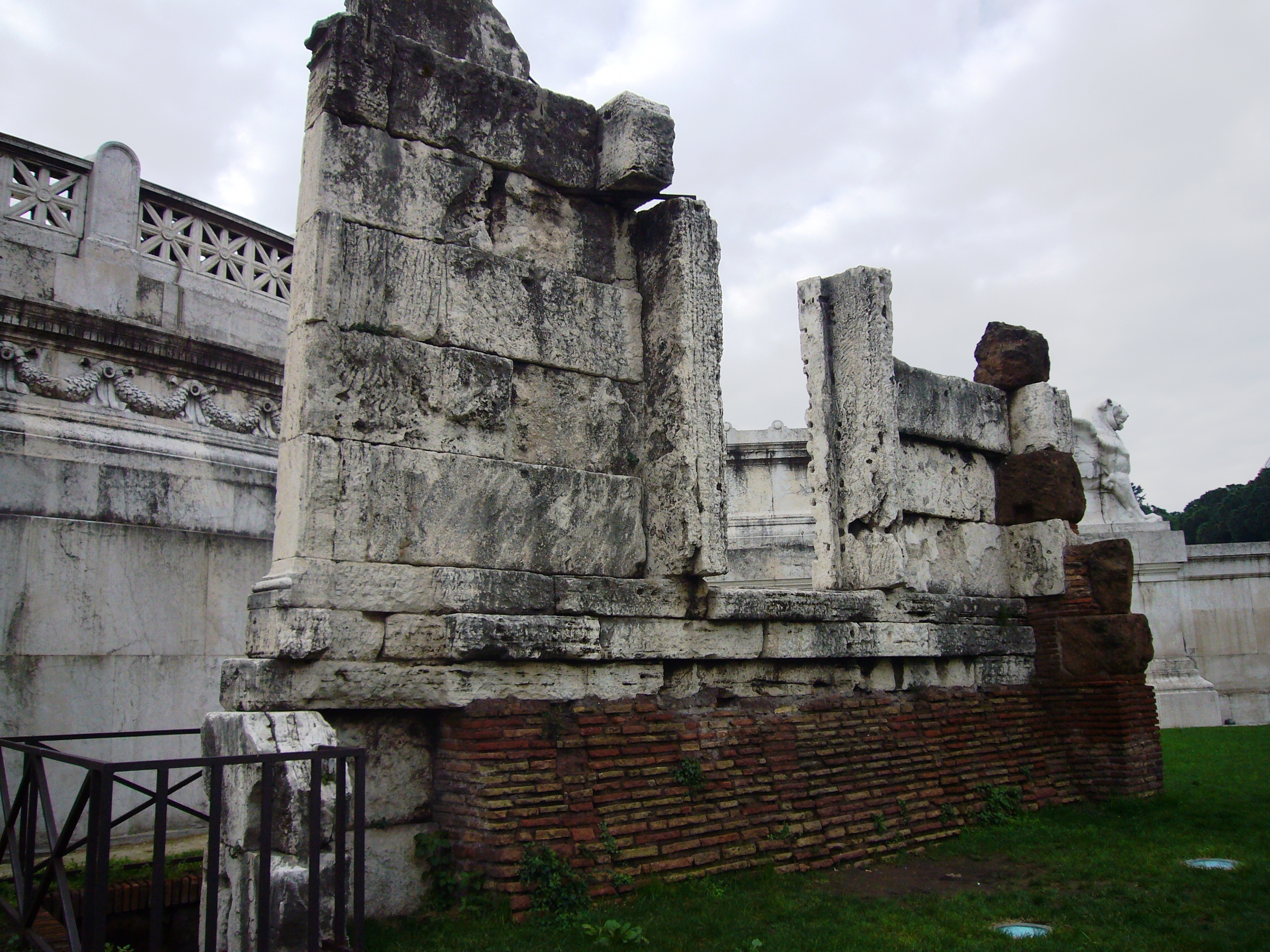
The tomb in 2007

The tomb of Gaius Publicius Bibulus is a monument in Rome, Italy. It is installed outside the Victor Emmanuel II Monument.
