= Letterio =

Letterio is a given name. Notable people with the given name include:

- Letterio Calapai (1901–1993), American artist and educator
- Letterio Catapano, Italian footballer
- Letterio Cucinotta (1902–1987), Italian racing driver
- Letterio Subba (1787–1868), Italian Romantic painter
