= Francesco Giangiacomo =

Italian illustrator and engraver

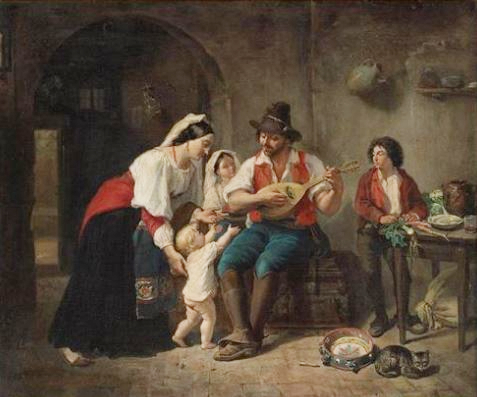
An Evening's Entertainment

Francesco Giangiacomo (1783 – 22 February 1864) was an Italian illustrator and engraver.

== Life ==
He was born in Rome, where he attended the Accademia di San Luca. After 1801, Giangiacomo was taught by Jean-Baptiste Wicar and commissioned to document, through engravings, many of the art works in Rome. He pursued this career for decades, and later became an instructor at the academy.

Among his pupils were the sculptor Luigi Amici, Luigi Calamatta, Paolo Mercuri, and his own son, Tertulliano (1823-1892).

He became a member of the Congregazione de Virtuosi al Pantheon. He engraved frescoes by Pinturicchio for the cloister of Santa Maria del Popolo, Sant'Onofrio, and for the Riario Chapel of Santa Maria del Popolo.
