= Tommaso Aloysio Juvara =

Italian engraver and etcher (1809–1875)

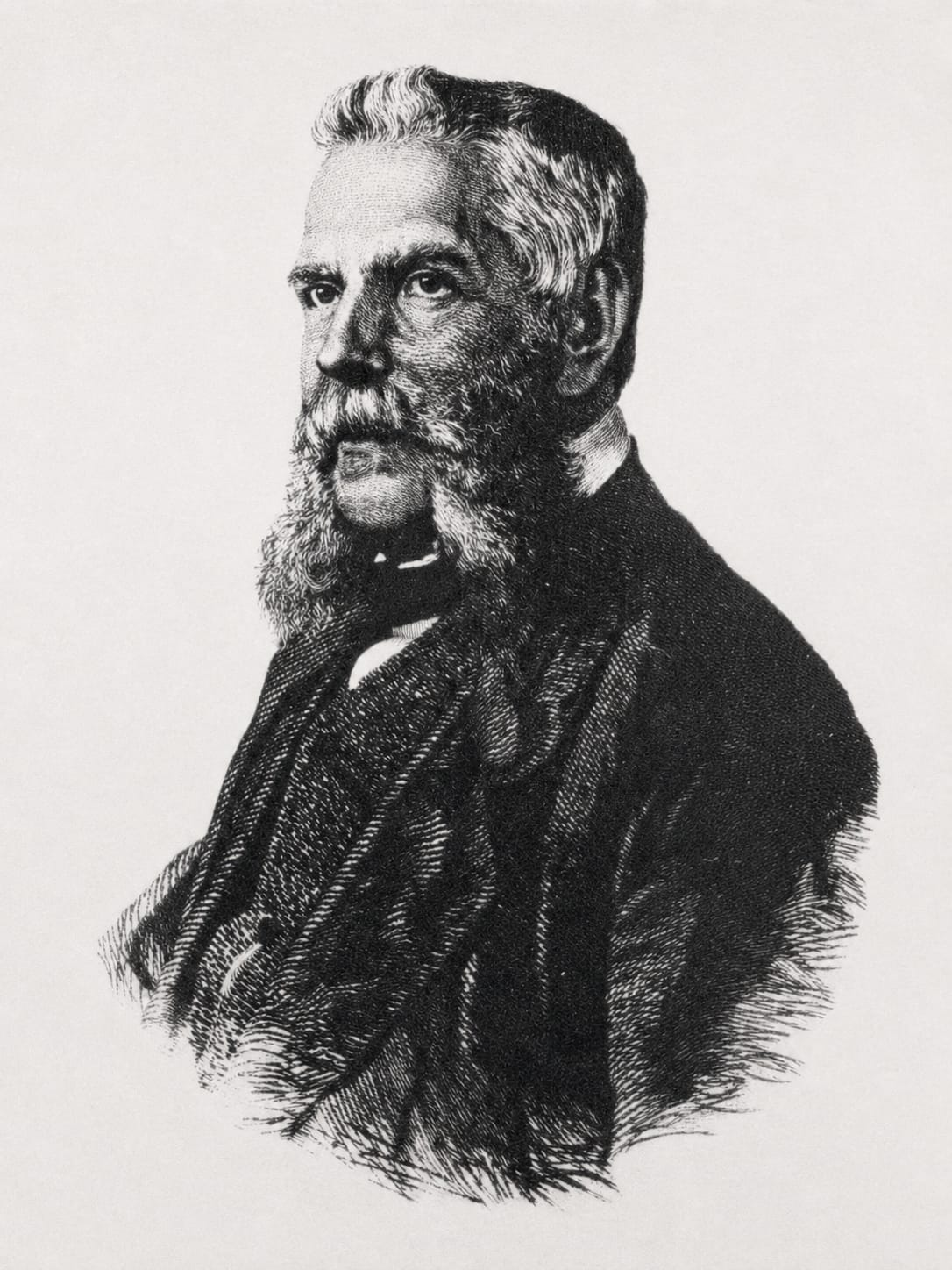
- Francesco Di Bartolo, Portrait of Tommaso Aloysio Juvara, etching, Naples
- Born: 12 January 1809; Messina, Sicily
- Died: 29 May 1875 (aged 66); Rome, Italy
- Education: Accademia di San Luca
- Known for: Engraving, etching

Tommaso Aloysio Juvara (12 January 1809 – 29 May 1875) was an Italian engraver, etcher and teacher. He taught engraving in Messina and Naples and later served as co-director of the Regia Calcografia in Rome.

== Biography ==
After his initial training with Letterio Subba in Messina, Juvara received a scholarship from his native city in 1825 to continue his studies in Rome at the Accademia di San Luca. There he studied under the Neoclassical painter Vincenzo Camuccini and received an academic prize for his drawings in 1827. He subsequently travelled in Europe, studying advanced methods of engraving and printmaking.

In 1836 he was appointed professor at the Academy of Fine Arts in Messina. He travelled to London and Paris in 1842 to study further graphic techniques and later taught copper engraving at the University of Messina. He also directed the chalcographic institution in his native city.

Juvara designed and engraved the dies for the Sicilian postage stamps bearing the portrait of King Ferdinand II of the Two Sicilies. The stamps were issued on 1 January 1859.

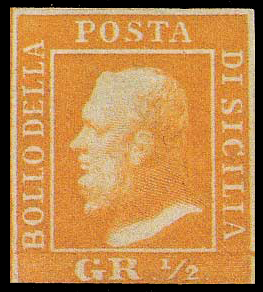
The portrait of Ferdinand II engraved by Tommaso Aloysio Juvara for the Sicilian postage stamps issued in 1859

In 1846 Juvara was appointed to teach at the Accademia di Belle Arti di Napoli, where he directed the newly established School of Different Methods of Engraving in Steel and Wood. In 1855 it became the School of Engraving in Copper and Steel and of the New Methods. He shared responsibility for the teaching of engraving with Francesco Pisante, directing the courses devoted to the gran genere of reproductive engraving and to the different graphic methods.

Juvara established a highly regarded school of engraving in Naples. His pupils included Francesco Di Bartolo, Saro Cucinotta and Giovanni Fusaro.

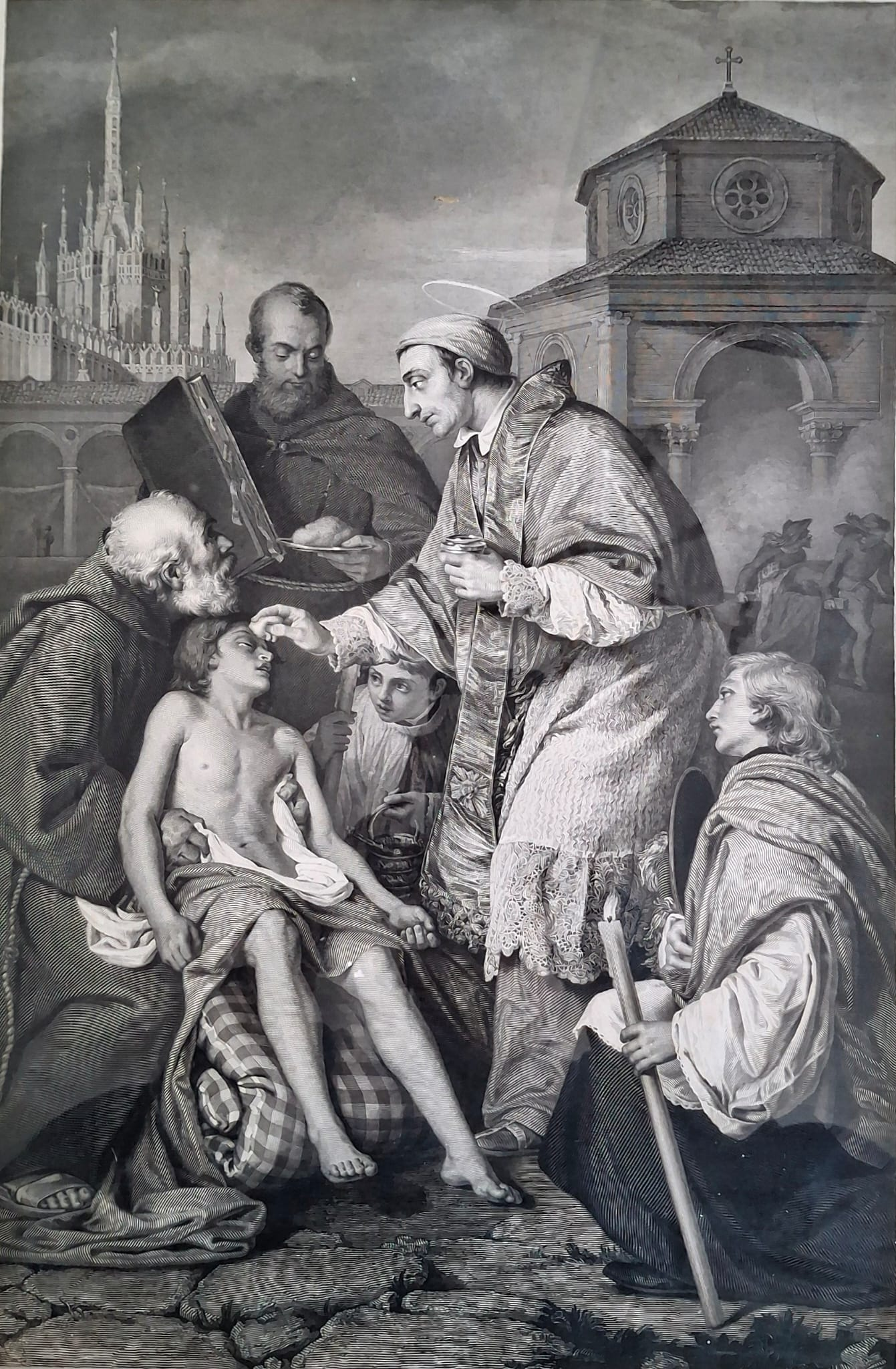
Tommaso Aloysio Juvara and Francesco Di Bartolo, Saint Charles Borromeo administering the last rites to a plague victim, burin engraving, Naples–Rome, published in 1875, Natalia Di Bartolo Collection

Beginning in the 1850s, Juvara directed the engraving of Saint Charles Borromeo administering the last rites to a plague victim, after the painting by Giuseppe Mancinelli in the church of San Carlo all'Arena in Naples. The preparatory drawing was executed by Saro Cucinotta. Juvara worked on the plate with Francesco Di Bartolo, who completed the engraving. The work was published by the Regia Calcografia in Rome in 1875.

After serving as an engraver to the King of the Two Sicilies, Juvara was called to Rome in 1870 by the Minister of Public Education, Cesare Correnti, to assist in the reorganisation of the Regia Calcografia. In 1872 he became its co-director with Paolo Mercuri. He was followed to Rome by Francesco Di Bartolo, one of his closest pupils, who received important ministerial commissions at the institution.

Di Bartolo portrayed Juvara twice in etching. One of these portraits is reproduced in the infobox.

== Works ==
Juvara achieved international recognition as an engraver. He exhibited works in Paris in 1855 and 1857, in Florence in 1861, in London in 1862 and in Berlin in 1868.

His early works included full-scale drawings and engravings of Saint John the Evangelist, after Guercino, and Saint Bartholomew, after Camuccini, produced for the Calcografia in Rome.

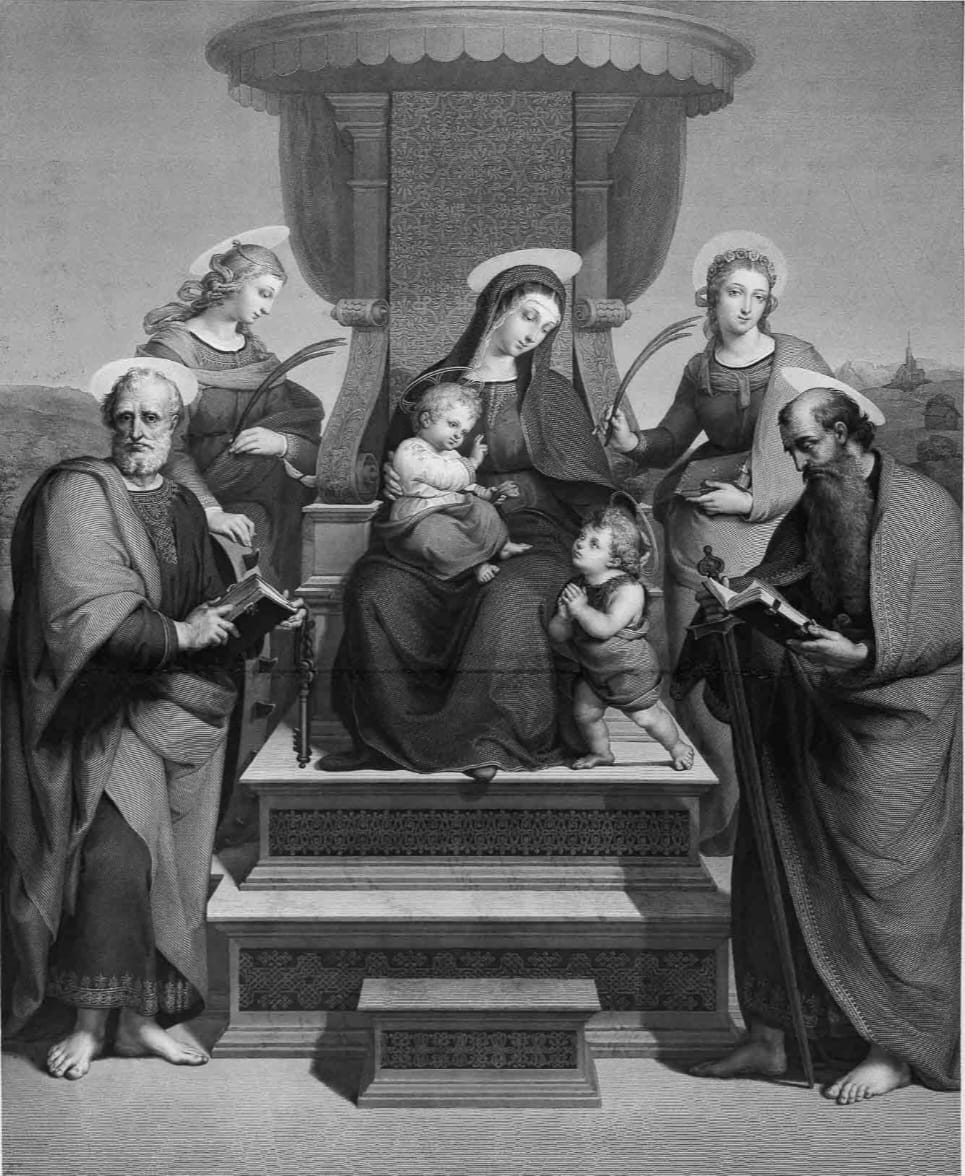
Tommaso Aloysio Juvara, Colonna Altarpiece after Raphael, etching and burin engraving, 1873, Istituto Centrale per la Grafica, Rome

His principal work was the large engraving after Raphael's Colonna Altarpiece, also known as the Madonna of the Royal Palace of Naples. Completed in 1873, it combined etching and burin engraving on copper. Raphael's original painting is now in the Metropolitan Museum of Art in New York.

== Death ==
In 1875, following internal disputes and accusations at the Regia Calcografia, including a serious conflict with the engraver Luigi Ceroni, Juvara died by suicide in his rooms at the institution. At the time, two of his engravings stood before him: the Colonna Altarpiece, which he regarded as his finest individual work, and the Saint Charles Borromeo, the culminating achievement of his school.

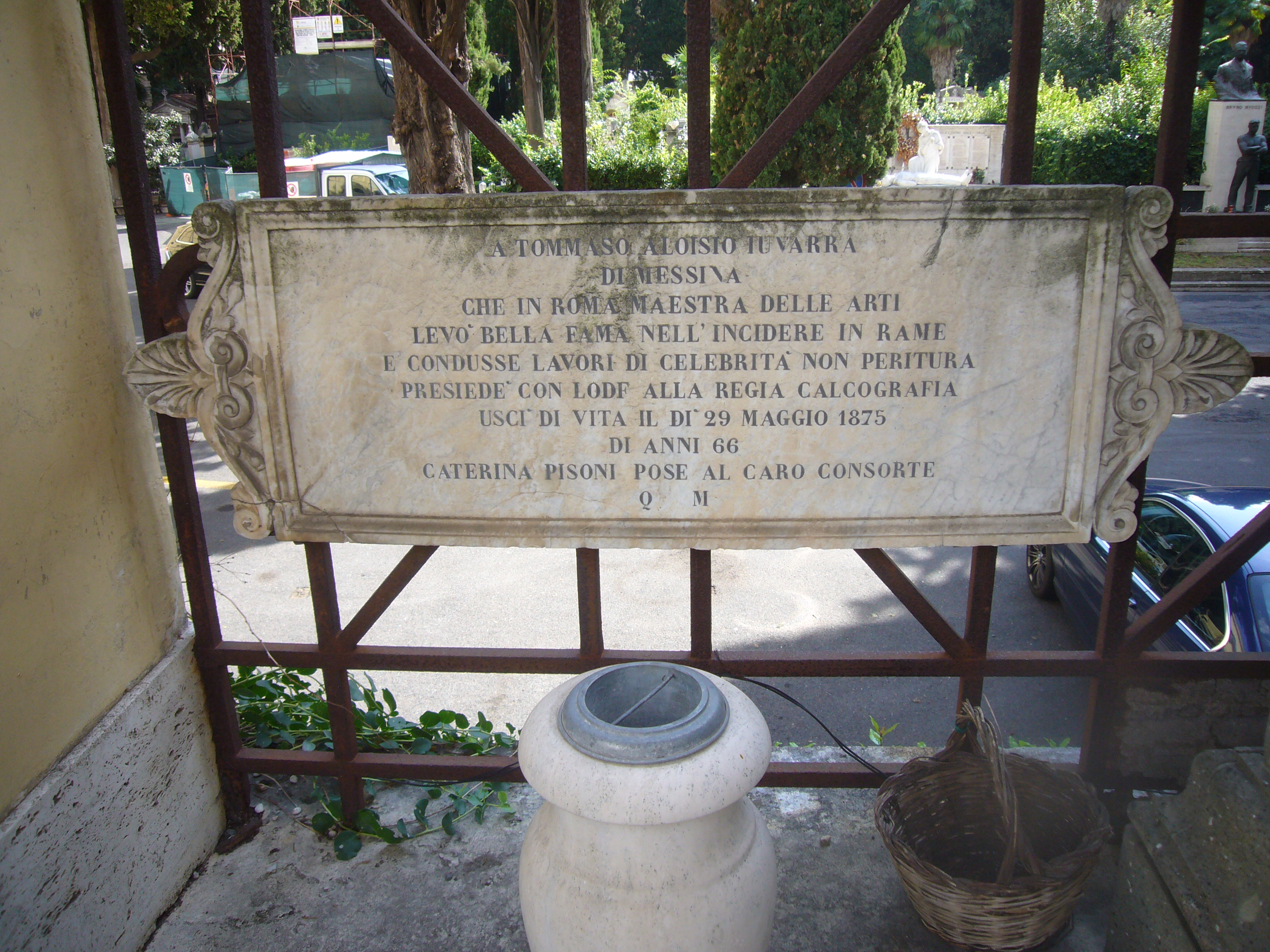
Memorial plaque to Tommaso Aloysio Juvara at the Campo Verano cemetery in Rome

Juvara was buried at the Campo Verano cemetery in Rome. His tomb was destroyed during the Second World War, and only its memorial plaque survives.

== Bibliography ==
- Calabi, Augusto (1933). "Iuvara, Tommaso Aloisio". Enciclopedia Italiana (in Italian). Istituto dell'Enciclopedia Italiana.
- Thieme, Ulrich; Becker, Felix (1926). Allgemeines Lexikon der Bildenden Künstler von der Antike bis zur Gegenwart (in German). Vol. 19. Leipzig. pp. 357–358.
- Di Bartolo, Natalia (2026). "Francesco Di Bartolo (1826–1913), incisore e pittore. Corpus fondante e corpus di saggi per il Bicentenario della nascita". OperaeOpera (in Italian).
- Di Bartolo, Natalia (2026). "Tommaso Aloysio Juvara, maestro di Francesco Di Bartolo". OperaeOpera (in Italian).
