= Victory Arch (disambiguation) =

Victory Arch is a set of two arches in Baghdad, Iraq.

Victory Arch may also refer to:

- Arco della Vittoria in Genoa, Italy
- Arco de la Victoria in Madrid, Spain
- Newport News Victory Arch in Newport News, Virginia
- The former Victory Arch in Madison Square, New York City
- Victory Arch at London Waterloo station

== See also ==
- Triumphal arch
- Memorial gates and arches
