= Catapano =

Catapano is an Italian surname. Notable people with the surname include:

- David Catapano, American chef, writer and television personality
- Letterio Catapano, Italian footballer
- Mike Catapano (born 1990), American football player
- Thomas F. Catapano (1949–2005), American politician
