= Michele Panebianco =

Italian painter

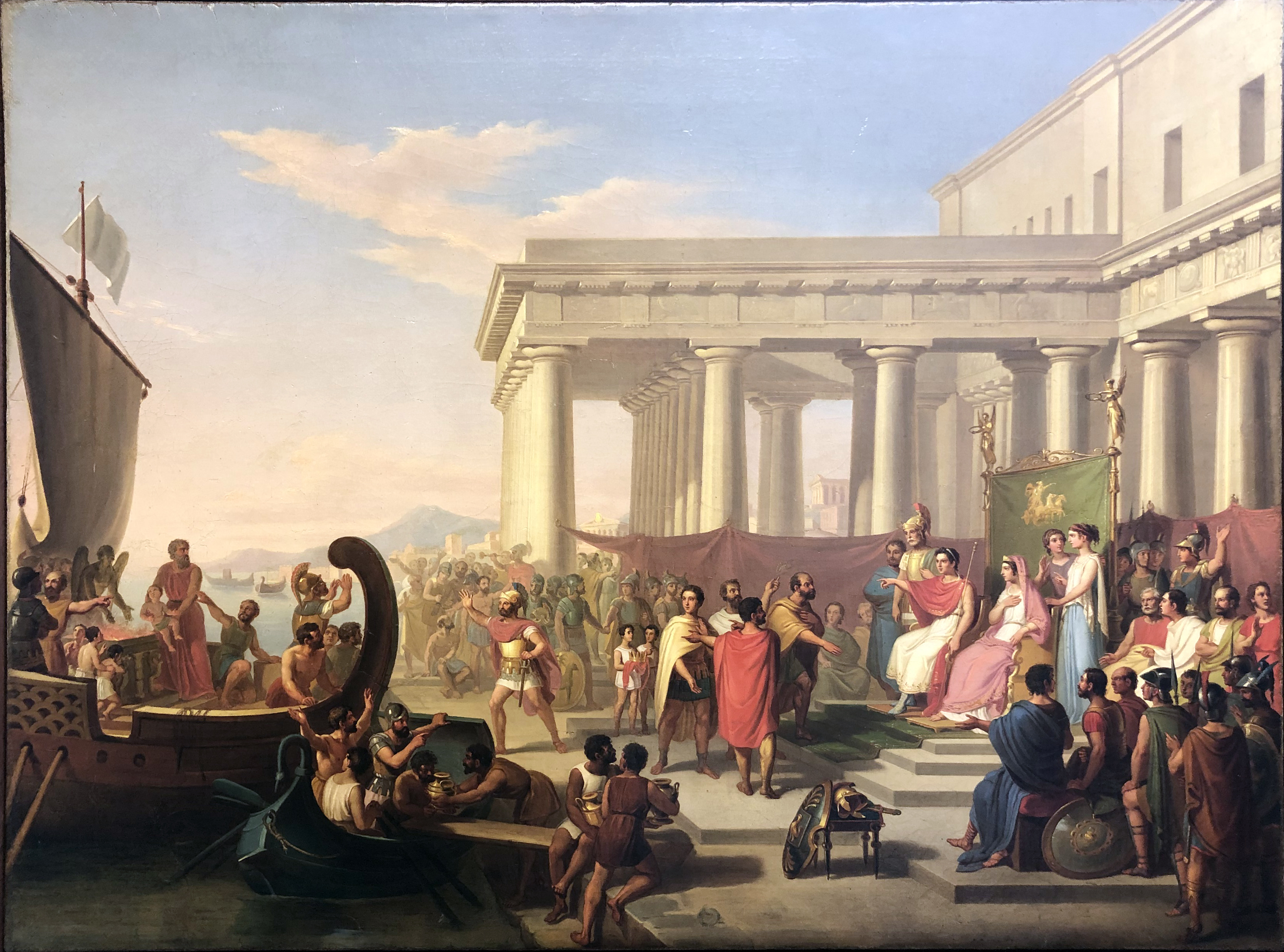
Gelon Granting Peace Terms to the Defeated Carthaginians on Condition That They Give Up Human Sacrifice, 1852

Michele Panebianco (20 December 1806 - 4 April 1873) was an Italian painter. He was born and died in Messina.

== Life ==
He studied in Rome under Letterio Subba then Vincenzo Camuccini. He headed Messina's scuola di belle arti. Many of his religious works were destroyed in the 1908 Messina earthquake, whilst surviving ones are in the Museo Regionale di Messina and various churches in Sicily. He was one of the first teachers of Lio Gangeri.

== Works ==
- Arrival of the Magi, copy of the original recorded in Sant'Andrea church, Messina
- Nativity, oil on panel, copy of the original recorded in the Alto Basso church, Messina; original moved from the monastic church of San Gregorio to the Museo Civico Peloritano (now known as the Museo Regionale) and re-attributed from Polidoro da Caravaggio
- The Stigmatization of St Francis, Montevergine church, Messina.The restoration of the painting was completed on 11 April 2025.
- Apostles, oil on panel, produced to complete the altarpiece in Santa Maria Assunta, Castroreale
- St Francis of Assisi, fresco, on the vault originally decorated with a fresco by Filippo Tancredi destroyed in the 1783 Calabrian earthquakes, recorded in the Oratorio di San Francesco alle Stimmate in the church of San Francesco dei Mercanti.
- Vara dell'Assunta, prints, Museo della Vara, Palazzo Zanca, Messina.
