= Arturo Dazzi =

Italian painter and sculptor

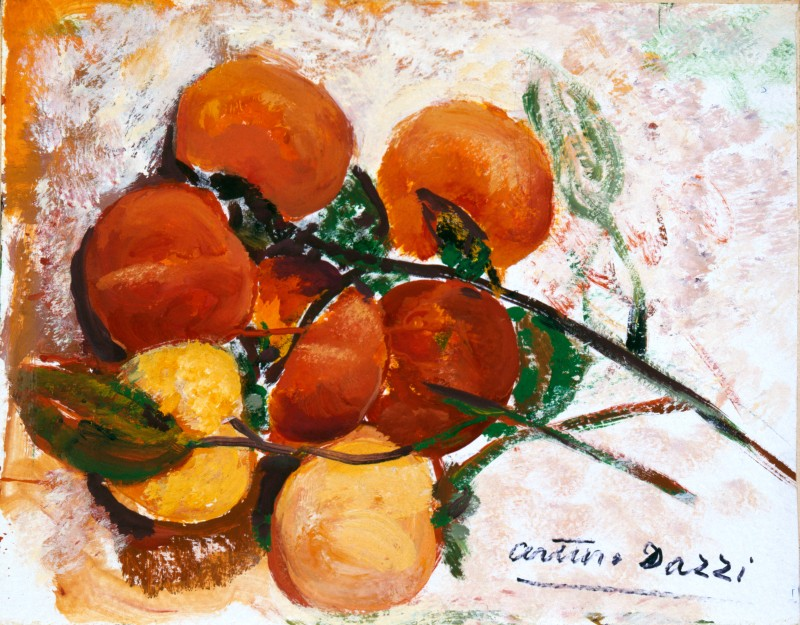
Natura morta (frutta) (Fondazione Cariplo)

Arturo Dazzi (13 July 1881 – 16 October 1966) was an Italian painter and sculptor.

== Biography ==
Dazzi was born in Carrara and attended the Accademia di Belle Arti di Carrara from 1892 to 1899, studying under sculptor Lio Gangeri. In 1901 he won the Pensionato Artistico Triennale Prize, followed in 1905 by the Quadriennale Prize which allowed him to move to Rome. In 1906 he participated in the Mostra Nazionale di Belle Arti di Milano and the following year in the Rome exhibition organised by the Società Promotrice degli Amatori e Cultori di Belle Arti, of which he became a member in 1911.

Having won awards at the international exhibition in San Francisco in 1915, he obtained important commissions in the field of celebratory sculpture, including the Monument to Enrico Toti and the Monument to the Railway Worker, inaugurated in Rome in 1922 and 1923. He also worked with the architect Marcello Piacentini on the artistic decoration of the Banca d’Italia building in the present-day Piazza del Parlamento (1922–1923), the Arco della Vittoria in Genoa (inaugurated in 1931) and the Palazzo di Giustizia in Milan (1939).

As a painter, he made his debut at the Rome Promotrice in 1927, and then participated in the first national exhibition devoted to the Animal in Art, at the zoological gardens in Rome in 1930, followed by the Venice Biennale in 1932 and the 2nd Rome Quadriennale in 1935. His sculptures were included in the universal exhibitions in Paris in 1937 and in New York in 1939, his monument to Guglielmo Marconi being displayed at the latter; he also executed the large stele dedicated to Marconi in EUR, Rome, in 1959. He held the chair of sculpture at the Carrara Academy from 1929 to 1951. Among his students was Clara Fasano.

Arturo Dazzi died in 1966 in Pisa.

== Sources ==
- Laura Casone, Arturo Dazzi, online catalogue Artgate by Fondazione Cariplo, 2010, CC BY-SA (source for the first revision of this article).

== Other projects ==
Media related to Arturo Dazzi at Wikimedia Commons
