= Giuseppe Prinzi =

Italian sculptor

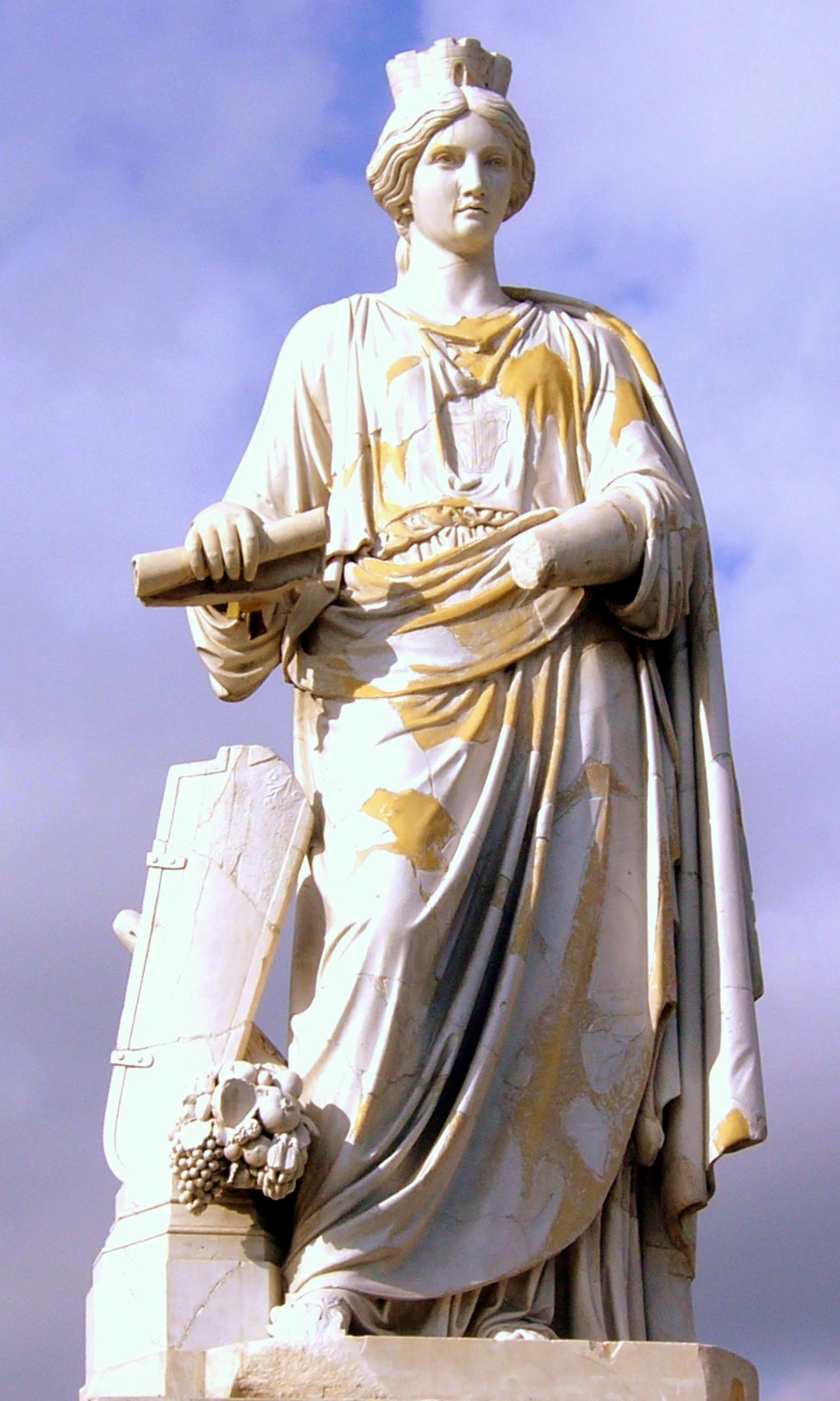
Prinzi's allegorical statue of Messina, in Messina

Giuseppe Prinzi (1825–1895) was an Italian sculptor.

== Biography ==
He began his studies in Messina with Letterio Subba and Thomas Aloisio Juvarra and continued his training at Academy of San Luca in Rome with Pietro Tenerani. He made numerous sculptures, which are located in various cities in Italy, among them, Rome, Naples and Messina, his hometown.

== Works (selection) ==
- Messina: Female statue with allegory of Messina (1852)
- Campobasso Statue of Flora (1873)
- St. Peter's Basilica (Vatican City): Statue of St. William of Vercelli (1878)
- Pincio (Rome): Bust astronomer Angelo Secchi (1879)
- Basilica di San Benedetto (Norcia) Statue of Saint Benedict (1880)
- Castle Pennisi Floristella (Acireale): Relief burial (1886)
- Cathedral of San Giovanni Battista (Ragusa, Sicily): Relief
- Teatro Vittorio Emanuele II (Messina): Bust of Ferdinand II
- Regional Museum of Messina: Bust of Antonello da Messina
