= Lio Gangeri =

Italian sculptor

- Born: Letterio Gangeri; January 6, 1845; Messina, Kingdom of the Two Sicilies
- Died: May 2, 1913; Salerno, Sicily, Italy
- Known for: sculptor

Lio Gangeri (June 1, 1845 – February 5, 1913) was an Italian sculptor.

== Life ==
He was born in Messina. His first artistic training was with the painter Michele Panebianco. In 1867 he moved to Rome where he studied under Giulio Monteverde. Later he worked in Italy but above all between Rome and in Messina.

Gangeri was the professor and president of Italian art academies such as the Accademia di Belle Arti di Carrara and of the Accademia di Belle Arti di Roma. Among his students were Arturo Dazzi.

He died in Salerno on February 5, 1913
