= Clara Fasano =

American sculptor

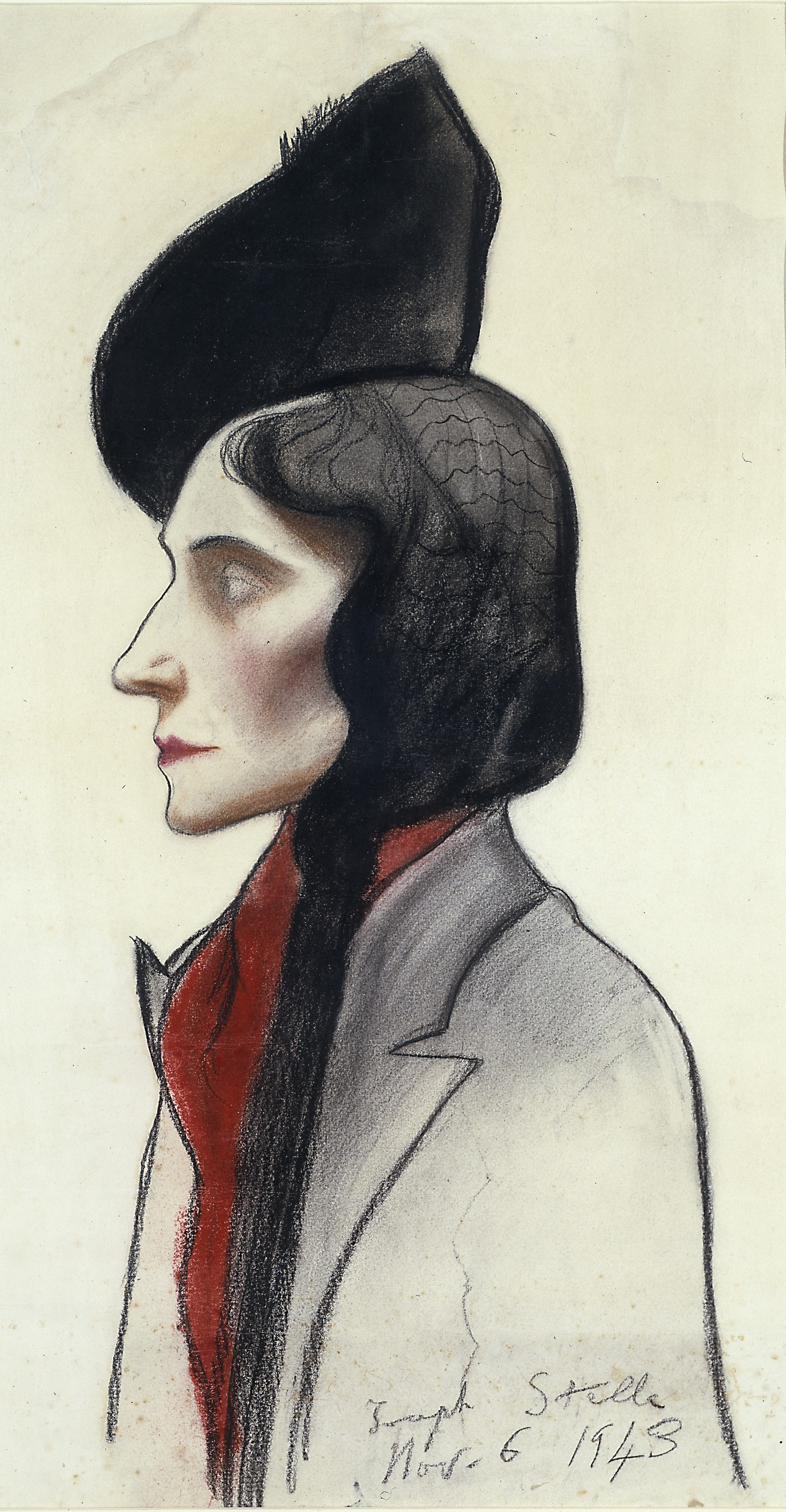
- A pastel portrait of Clara Fasano by her friend, Joseph Stella, from 1943

Clara Fasano (December 14, 1900 – 1990) was an Italian-born American sculptor known for her terracotta figures with religious or allegorical themes.

== Early years and career ==
Fasano was born in Castellaneta, Italy, where she came from a long line of sculptors and carvers; her family immigrated to the United States when she was three. Her father, Pasquale Fasano earned a living in New York City carving architectural ornamentation. By 1940 she had gained US citizenship. She studied at the Cooper Union Art School, the Art Student's League and Adelphi College in New York City, the Académie Colarossi and Academie Julian in Paris. She also studied with Arturo Dazzi in Rome. She taught art at the Dalton School in New York City and at Manhattanville College in Purchase, New York. Fasano began exhibiting her work at the National Academy of Design in New York in the 1930s.

During the Great Depression, US President Franklin D. Roosevelt initiated the New Deal. One of its early programs was the 1933-1934 Public Works of Art Project (PWAP), on which Fasano was one of the first sculptors to work. Fasano created a plaque commemorating Governor Donegan for the Port Richmond High School in Staten Island for PWAP in 1934. The Federal Art Projects was another New Deal initiative under which the federal government hired artists, mostly painters and sculptors to create art for a variety of public places, often post offices. Fasano created a plaster relief, "The Family" for the post office in Middleport, Ohio in 1939.

Fasano was a member of the Sculptors Guild and exhibited at its 1940 and 1941 exhibitions. Fasano also exhibited at the 3rd Sculpture International in Philadelphia in 1949. She was a member of the National Sculpture Society, Audubon Artists and the National Association of Women Artists, as well as the National Academy of Design, which awarded her the Daniel Chester French Medal in 1965 and the Dessie Greer Prize in 1968. Fasano's papers can be found at the Special Collections Research Center, Syracuse University.

== Personal life ==
Fasano was married to Jean de Marco, a sculptor and fellow member of the National Academy of Design, with whom she lived in Greenwich Village, in 1936. Late in life she and her husband split their time between New York City and Cervaro, Italy.

Fasano was friends with American artist Joseph Stella, and is the subject of both casual studies and formal portraits by Stella.

== Work ==
Significant works include:

- Country Dance, Syracuse University, University Art Collection, Syracuse, New York
- Penelope, Smithsonian American Art Museum, Washington, District of Columbia
- Mary Magdalene, National Academy of Design, New York, New York
- Heroic Head, Metropolitan Museum of Art, New York, New York
- Roman Seamstress

== Bibliography ==
- Panzetta, Alfonso (2003). Nuovo dizionario degli scultori italiani dell'Ottocento e del primo Novecento: da Antonio Canova ad Arturo Martini (in Italian). Vol. 1 (revised ed.). Turin, Italy: AdArte. p. 363. ISBN 978-88-89082-00-3.
- Soria, Regina (1997). Fratelli lontani: il contributo degli artisti italiani all'identità degli Stati Uniti: 1776-1945 (1. ed. italiana ed.). Napoli: Liguori. ISBN 978-88-207-2679-9.
- Bessone Aurelj, Antonietta Maria (1947). Dizionario degli scultori ed architetti italiani. Genova: Società anonima editrice Dante Alighieri.
