= Jean-Baptiste Wicar =

French painter (1762–1834)

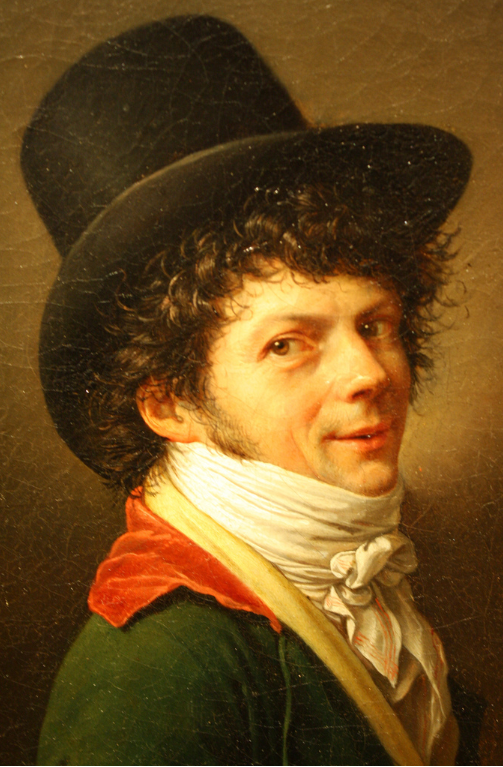
- Self-Portrait (1796)
- Born: 22 January 1762; Lille, France
- Died: 27 February 1834 (aged 72); Rome, Papal States
- Known for: Painting
- Movement: Neoclassicism

Jean-Baptiste Wicar (22 January 1762 – 27 February 1834) was a French Neoclassical painter and art collector.

== Life ==
The son of a carpenter, Wicar was born in Lille. He studied drawing at the free school in Lille before further honing his talents in the studio of David. The drawings Wicar created of Tableaux, statues, bas-reliefs et camées de la Galerie de Florence et du palais Pitti (Paintings, statues, bas-reliefs and cameos in the Gallery of Florence and the Pitti Palace) were published in Paris in 4 volumes at the Lacombe publishing house from 1789 to 1807.

[Wicar headed the commission set up to loot artworks from the Austrian Netherlands to enrich museums in France. An initial convoy left Antwerp on 11 August 1794, notably with paintings by Rubens, for the Louvre. Abbeys and castles were systematically emptied of their contents, furniture and works of art. Wicar was also a member of the commission des sciences et des arts on the Italian campaign, in the entourage of Bonaparte. This commission was charged with seizing artworks that could enrich French national museum collections. He finally permanently settled in Rome in 1800 and became a portraitist of European renown.

On his death in Rome in 1834, Wicar left the major collection of 1,300 drawings he had accumulated over his lifetime to the Société des Sciences, de l’Agriculture et des Arts de Lille. Mostly from the Italian school, but also in some small measure from the northern schools, it held drawings by artists like Raphael, Albrecht Dürer, Lucas Cranach, Nicolas Poussin and Jacques-Louis David. This legacy initially formed the public "musée Wicar", which in 1866, merged into the Palais des beaux-arts de Lille.

Among his pupils was Francesco Giangiacomo.

== Works ==
- Boutigny-sur-Essonne, church, St John the Baptist and Saint Sebastian
- Naples, Galleria Nazionale di Capodimonte, Portrait of Marie-Julie Bonaparte and her daughters, Zénaïde and Charlotte.
- Paris, Musée du Louvre, Portrait of Jacques-Louis David, given to the Louvre in 1998.
- Lille, Musée des Beaux-Arts, Portrait of general Murat.
- Rome, Museo Napoleonico, Carlotta Bonaparte principessa Gabrielli as a young peasant woman.
- Musée de la Révolution française, Portrait of First Republic, first painted representation of the French Republic.
- Art Institute of Chicago, Virgil reading the Aeneid to Augustus, Octavia and Livia (1790)

== Selected paintings ==
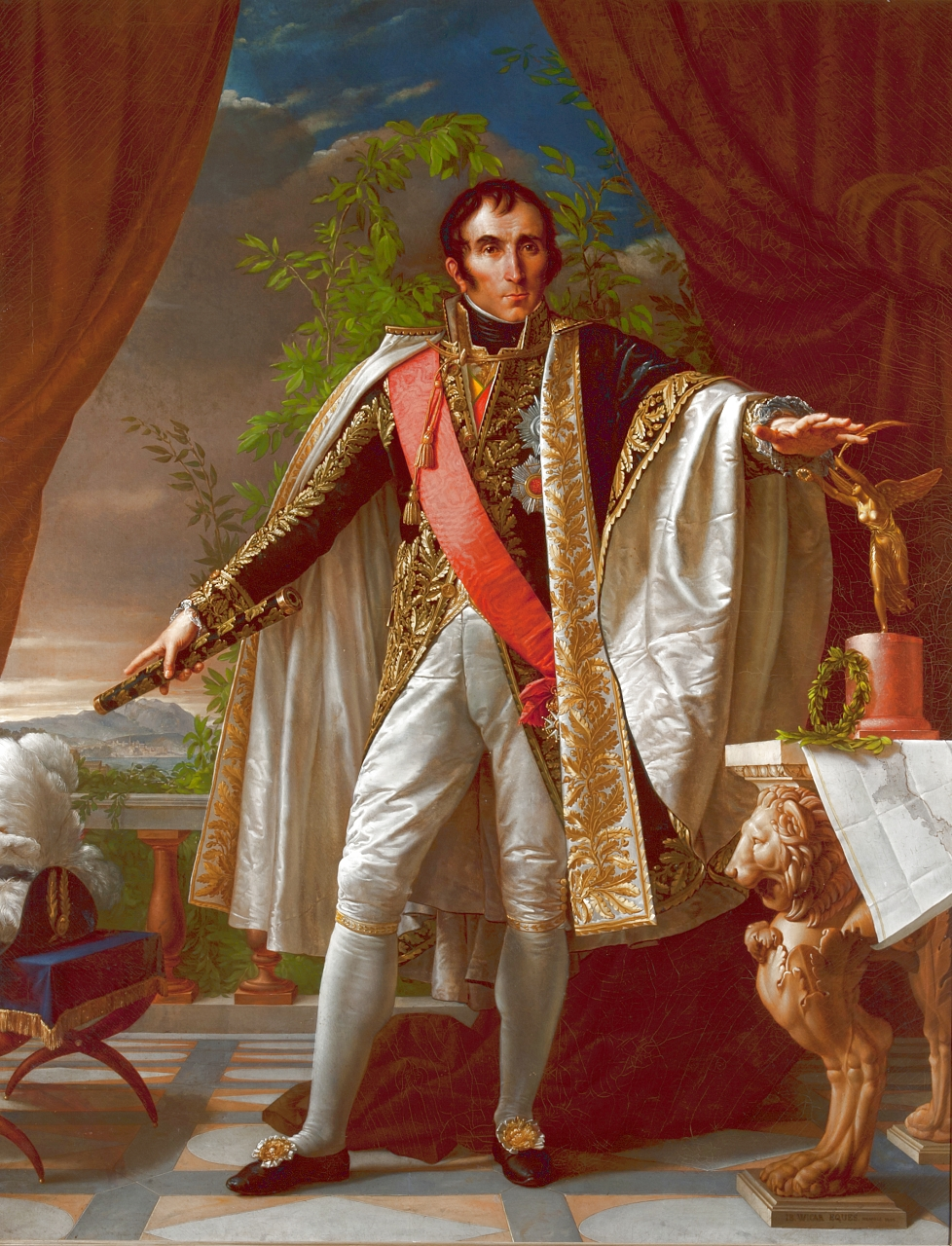
Antoine Christophe Saliceti (1808)

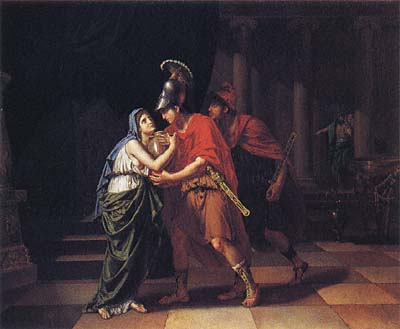
Electra Receiving the Ashes of Orestes (ca. 1826–27)

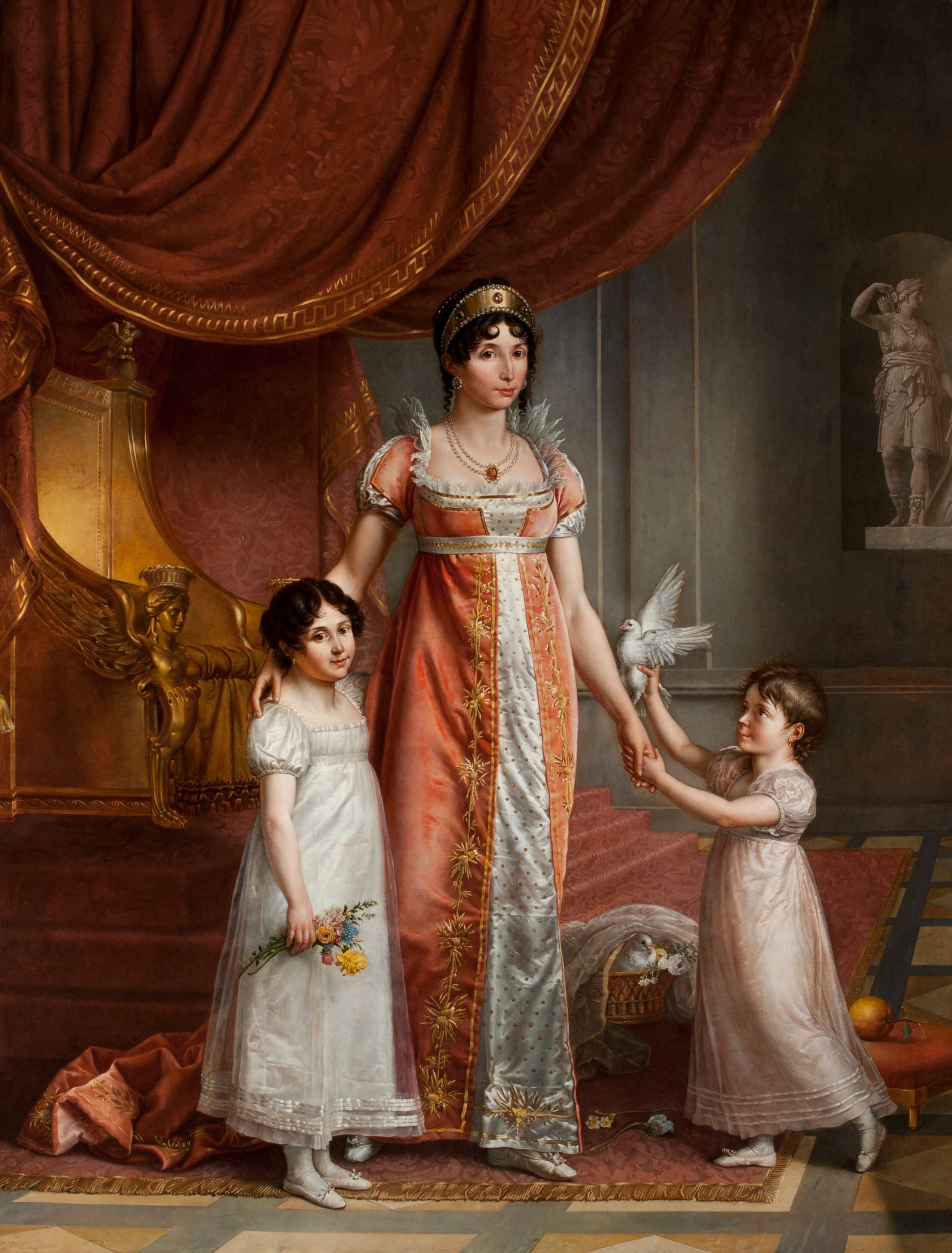
Julie Bonaparte with her daughters Zénaïde and Charlotte (1809)

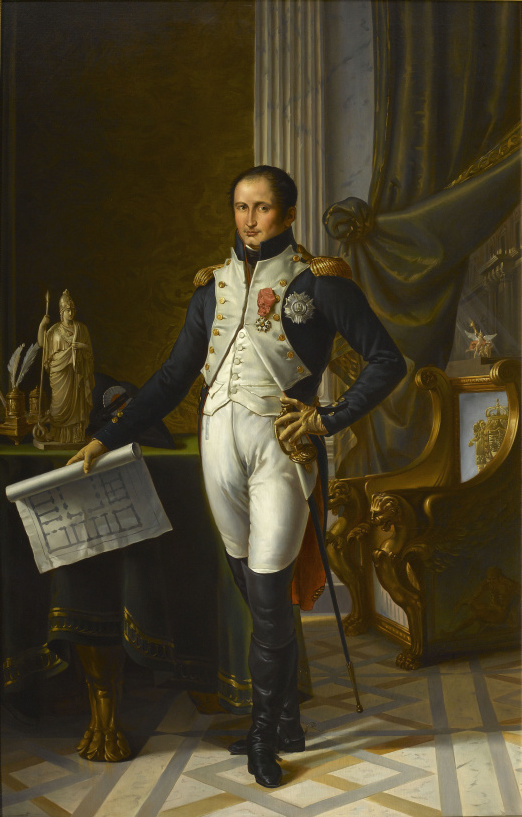
Joseph Bonaparte (1808)

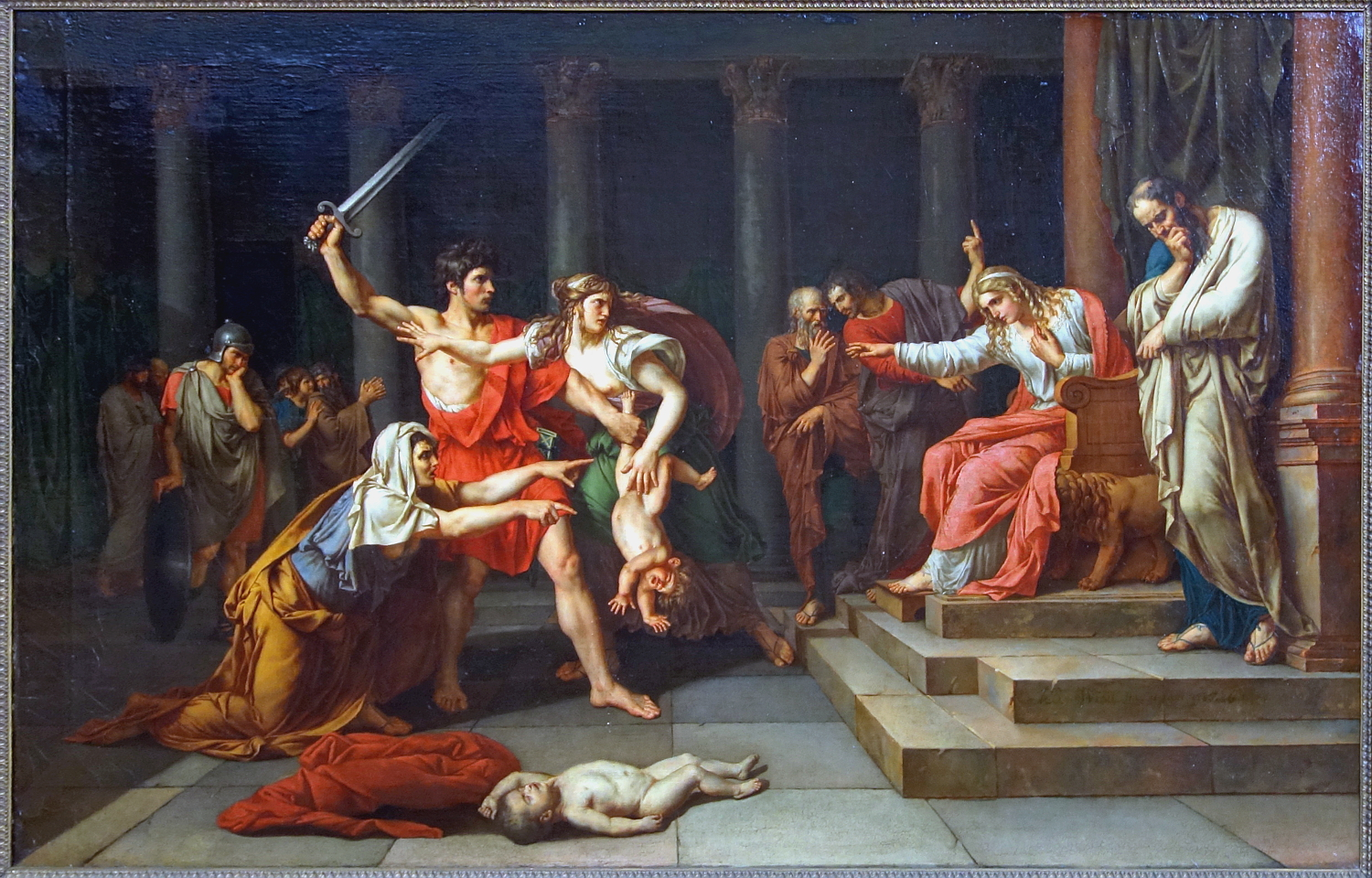
Solomon's Judgement (1785)

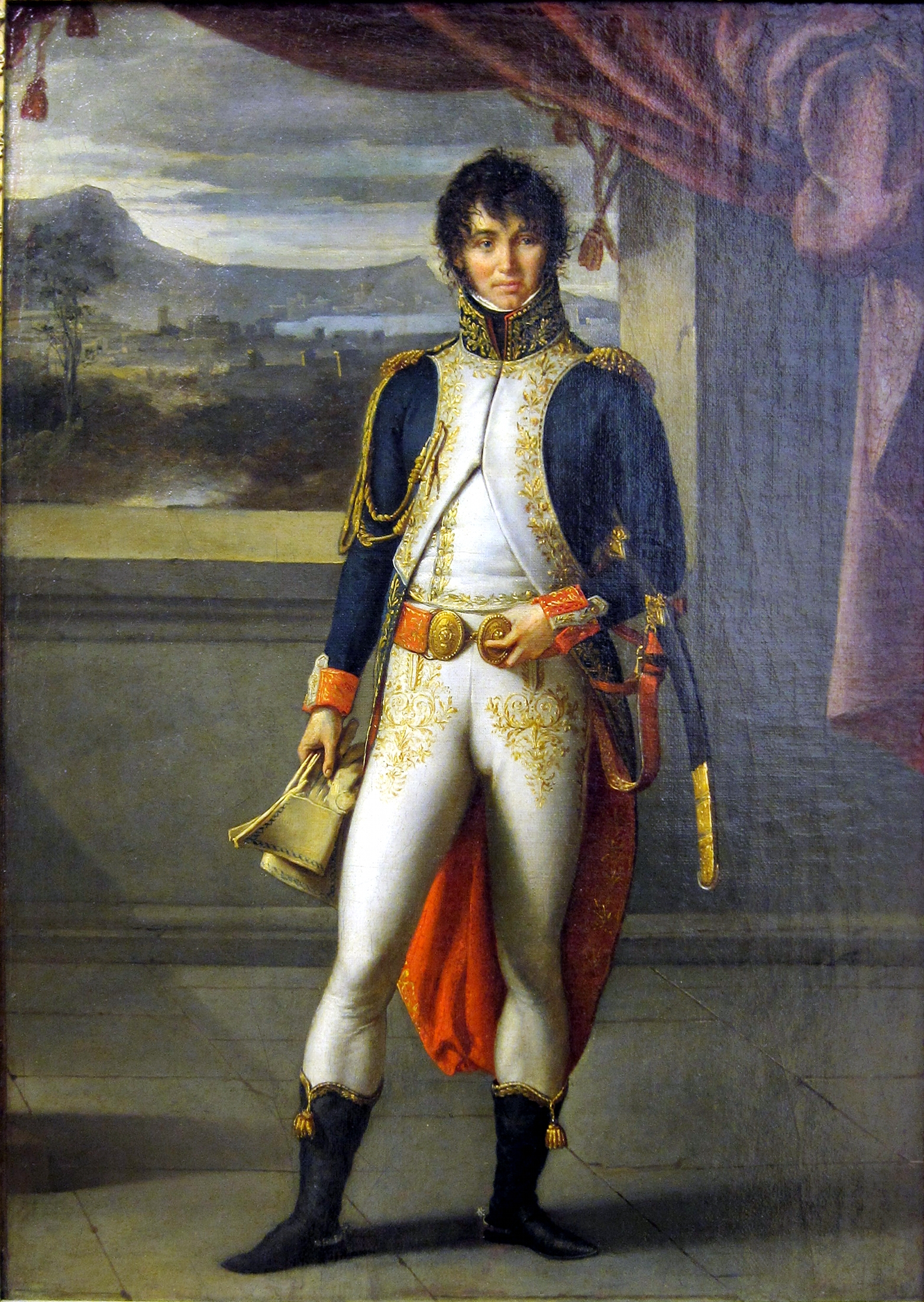
Joachim Murat

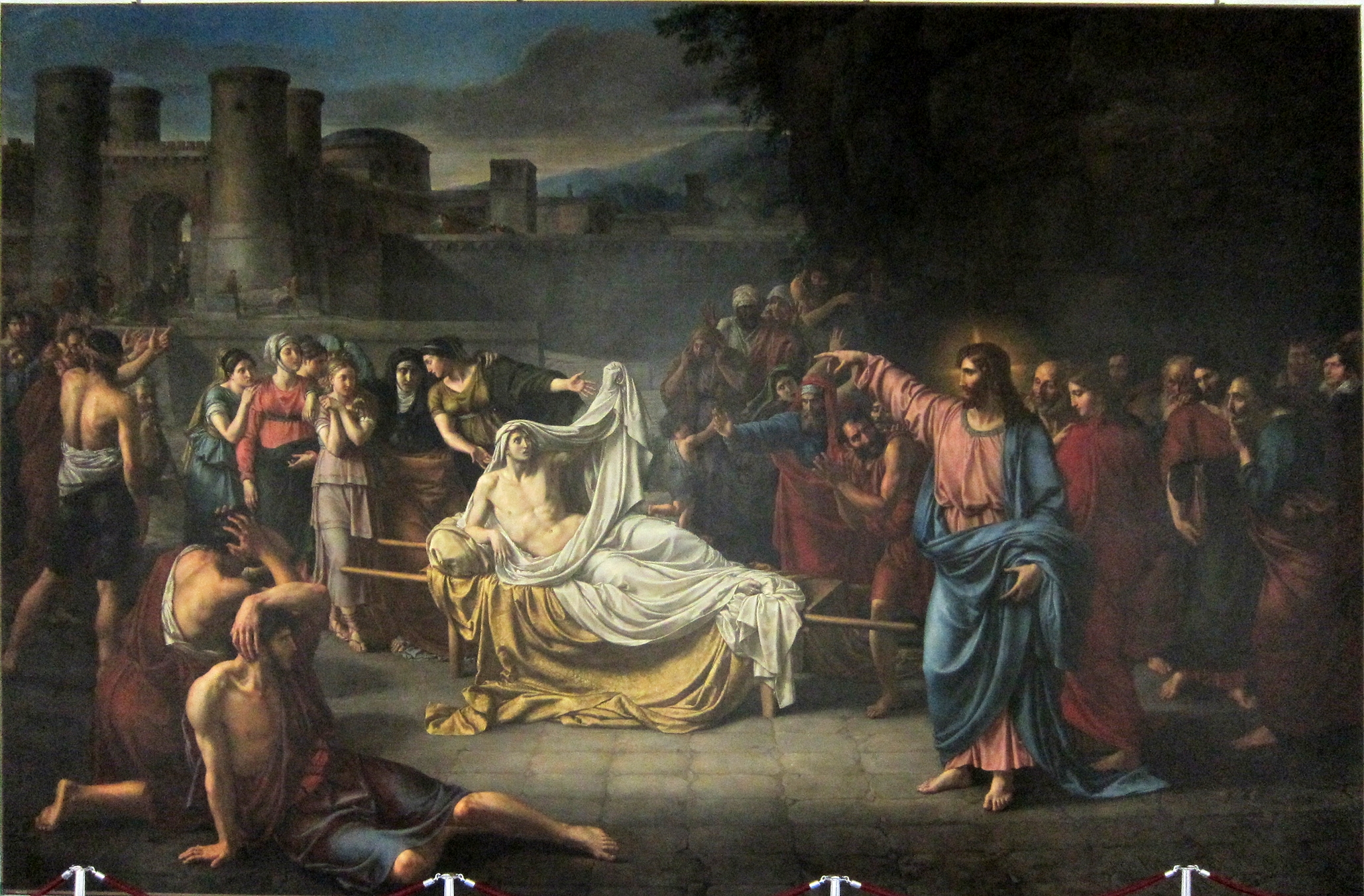
The Resurrection of the Son of the Widow of Nain (1816)

== Sources ==
- Fernand Beaucamp : Le peintre lillois Jean Baptiste Wicar (1762 1834) son oeuvre et son temps (Lille, 1939, 2 vols).
- Maria Teresa Caracciolo et Gennaro Toscano : Jean-Baptiste Wicar et son temps 1762-1834 (Villeneuve d’Ascq: Presses Universitaires du Septentrion, 2007).
