= Joséphine Calamatta =

French painter

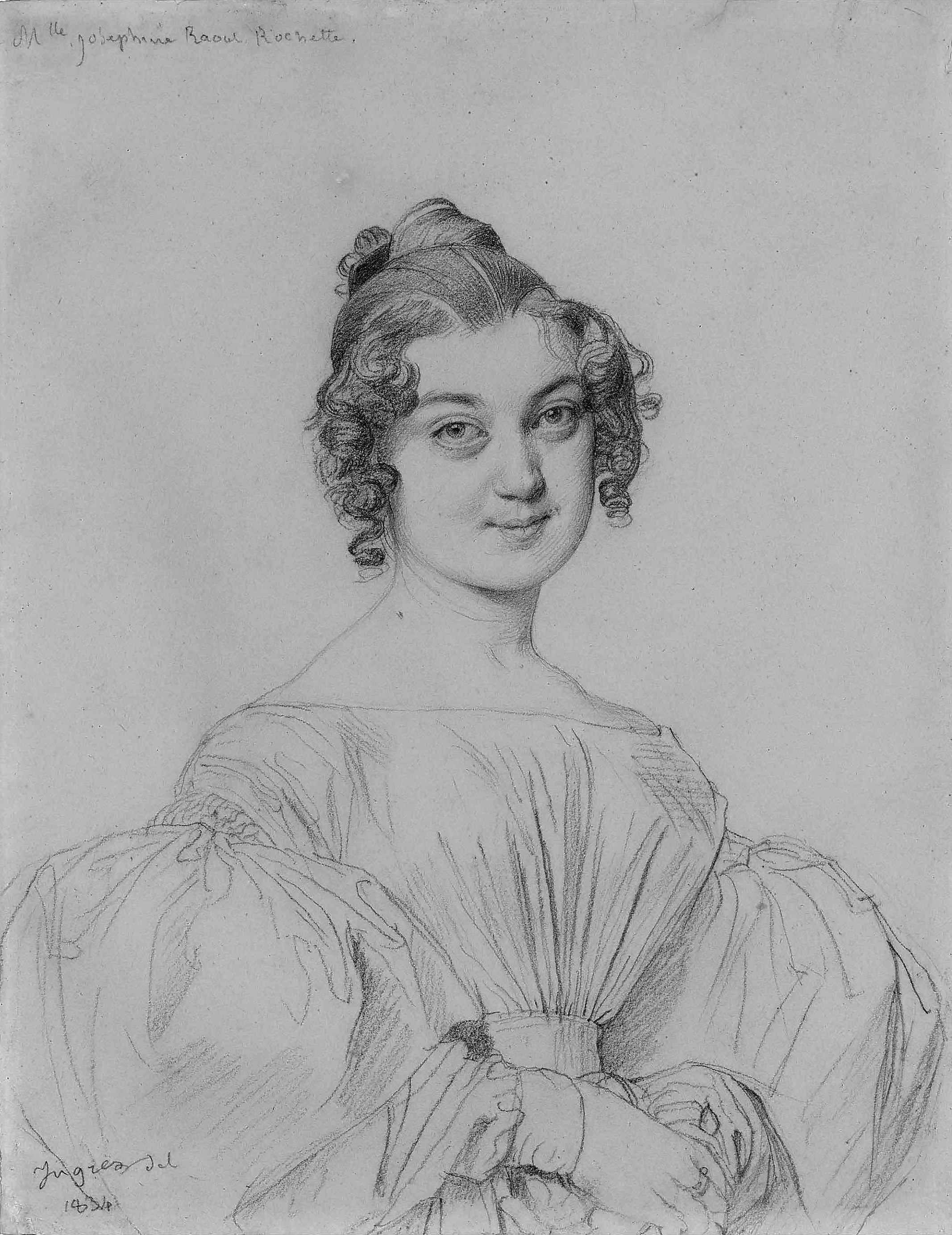
Joséphine Calamatta (Jean-Auguste-Dominique Ingres, 1834)

Joséphine Calamatta (March 1, 1817 – December 10, 1893) was a French painter and engraver who painted portraits as well as symbolistic, religious and allegorical pictures.

Saint Cecilia, 1846, Musée Ingres de Montauban

Her work was influenced by one of her teachers, the French neo-classical painter, Jean-Auguste-Dominique Ingres. Jean-Hippolyte Flandrin was another of her teachers. Her own pictorial voice featured striking and strong use of colour, and was reminiscent of Italian Renaissance art and paintings of the Spanish Baroque painter Bartolomé Esteban Murillo.

== Early years ==
Born in Paris on March 1, 1817, Anne Joséphine Cécile Raoul Rochette (known as Joséphine Raoul Rochette) was the daughter of French archaeologist Désire Raoul Rochette and granddaughter of neoclassical sculptor Jean-Antoine Houdon. As her father travelled often because of his work as perpetual secretary of the Académie des Inscriptions et Belles-Lettres and his own research, her early education and that of her only sister were left in the hands of their pious mother.

== Marriage to Luigi Calamatta ==
In 1839, Joséphine, at the age of 16, became engaged to the Italian painter and engraver, Luigi Calamatta (1802–1869), whom she had met whilst he was collaborating in Paris with his friend Ingres. Ingres and Calamatta had first met in 1820 when the French artist lived and worked in Florence. The couple married on December 1, 1840, and moved to Brussels, where Luigi Calamatta had been made professor of engraving at the Ecolé Royale. Today, his portrait painted by Joséphine hangs in the Galleria di Arte Moderna in Palazzo Pitti in Florence. In 1842, their only daughter, Marcelline, called Lina in the family, was born in Paris.

== Abandonment of her family ==
Joséphine left her husband and daughter in 1852. The name of the man she deserted them for is unknown. However, in October 1894, the writer Edmond de Goncourt in his journal tells us that she ran away from her 'crazy' engraver husband 'who dressed in pink' for a young man who dressed 'normally' and that she kept until her dying day the mattress on which the lovers had spent so many happy hours had caused quite a scandal even in artistic libertine circles. Now, free of family ties, Joséphine settled in Paris where she barely supported herself with her painting and where she failed to become recognized for her considerable talent. Her daughter, Lina, remained with and was brought up by Luigi.

== Marriage of her daughter, Lina ==
On May 17, 1862, Lina married Jean-François-Maurice-Arnauld, Baron Dudevant, better known as Maurice Sand, the son of writer George Sand, who was an old friend of her father. The friendship stemmed from the time he had painted a now well-known portrait of her in 1837. Joséphine did not attend the wedding as it is probable that she did not approve of the difference in the ages of the two fiancées nor that the young couple would live with Maurice's mother who exercised a strong hold over him. But Lina adored her mother-in-law, and was a source of pride and joy for the writer whose relationship with her own daughter, Solange, was, problematic. In 1863, Lina had a son, Marc-Antoine Dudevand-Sand, who died the following year; three years later, she gave birth to a daughter, Aurore "Lolo" Dudevand-Sand (1866–1961), and then another daughter, Gabrielle "Titite" Dudevant-Sand (1868–1909), two years after that. Aurore would marry the French painter Charles Frédéric Lauth whilst Gabrielle married an Italian drawing teacher, Romeo Palazzi. Neither had children.

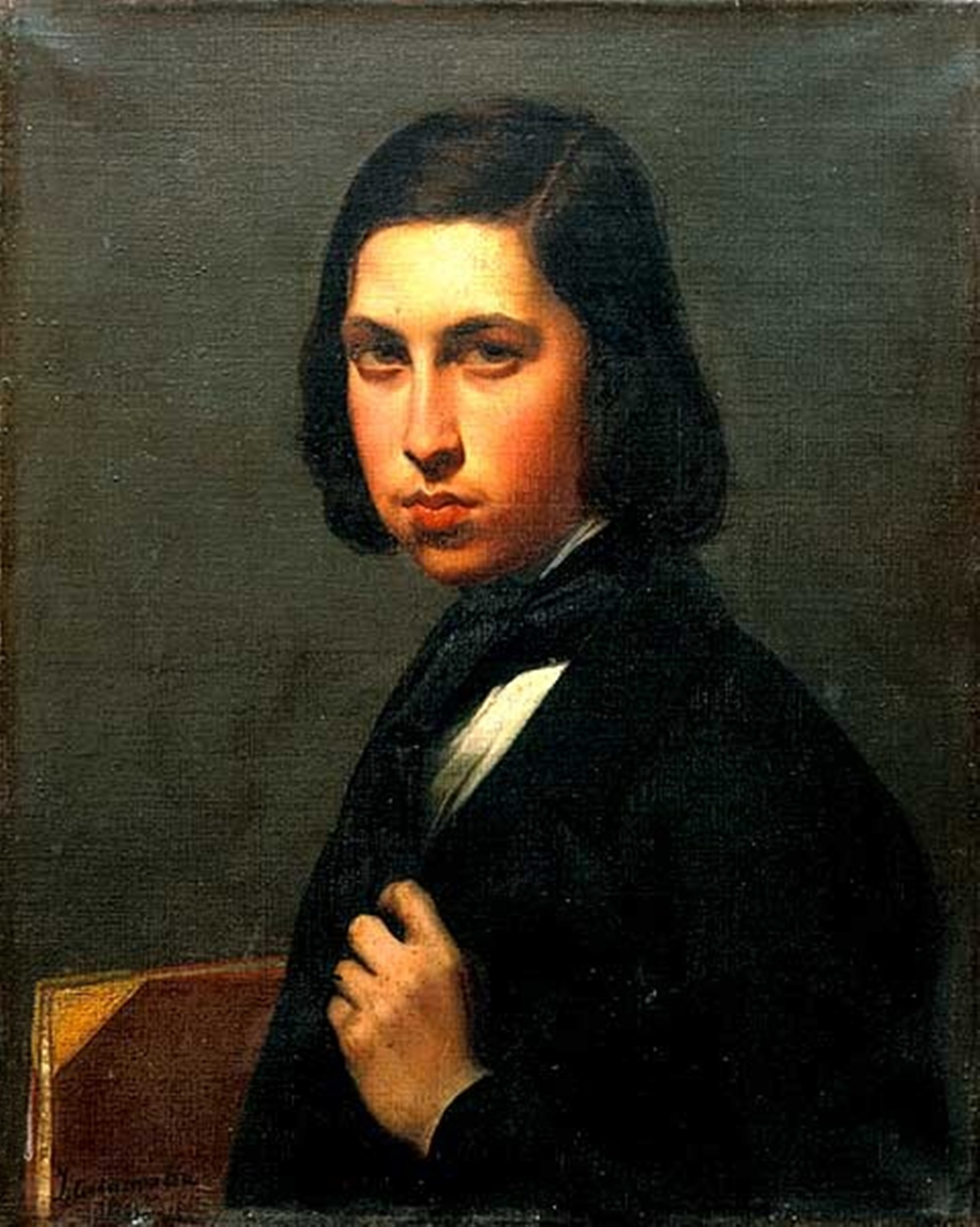
Portrait of Maurice Sand (1845), oil, by Joséphine Calamatta

== Relationship with George Sand ==
Without doubt, the Calamatta and her daughter's mother-in-law knew each other as Joséphine had painted Maurice Sand's portrait in 1845. There is also evidence that, with discretion, George Sand attempted to help the artist procure painting commissions and to show her works at least one exhibition.

== Death of Luigi Calamatta ==
After Lina's marriage, the rapport between mother and daughter improved and letters demonstrate that Joséphine was very fond of her daughter. This remained so until Luigi Calamatta died in Milan in 1869. When it came time to divide his estate in 1872, Joséphine simply ignored the fact that it was she who had run out on her family twenty years before. She, instead, believed that Maurice was promoting his wife's inheritance at her expense. Perhaps motivated by her own less than flourishing finances, she felt she was being deprived of what was rightfully hers and she let it be known, intimating that her daughter would lose even more on her death—and so it was to be. Joséphine also opposed a proposed biography of Luigi Calamatta that Lina had hoped George Sand would write. In response, she made no qualms about indicating that basically her husband had only been an engraver, albeit a good one, but that 'in the end, an engraver is never anything but a second rate artist, because he is nothing but a copyist'. She also demanded that if the biography were to be published, it should be published after her death so that her private life would not be made public fodder. In the end, it was never written.

== Religious life ==
Between 1881 and 1882, Joséphine, under the spiritual guidance of Abbot Huvelin, a noted confessor in Paris, turned towards the religious life. In 1884, joined the order of the Sœurs de l'Adoration Réparatrice and devoted herself to prayer and penitence. Nonetheless, she continued to paint, now preferring religious themes.

== Death ==
After a short illness, Joséphine Calamatta died in Paris on December 10, 1893. She was buried in her nun's habit at Montparnasse cemetery not far from the monumental tomb of the Sœurs de l'Adoration Réparatrice. Her gravestone simply reads 'Anne Joséphine Cécile Raoul Rochette, widow Calamatta, in religion Sister Marie-Joseph of Mercy. Pray for her. 1817-1893'. True to her word, in her will she left only a small amount of money to Lina. An annuity and money left to her by her cousin were bequeathed to the poor. In the same document, she stated that she bitterly regretted the mistakes she had made in her past and the bad example she set asking her daughter and her family to forgive her from the bottom of her heart.

== Works ==
According to Anne Chevereau in her article "Joséphine Calamatta, élève d’Ingres et mère (méconnue) de Lina", Joséphine Calamatta's works have been scattered and that to make a catalogue of them would be virtually impossible. According to Clara Erskine Clement, however, Joséphine did receive two medals at the Salons but she does not tell us at which ones. The following list, of her paintings is partial and incomplete. Sometimes, previously little known works of hers appear at prestigious auction houses throughout Europe.

- Grandmother's Birthday
- Portrait of Luigi Calamatta Galleria di Arte Moderna in Palazzo Pitti, Florence (Italy)
- Portrait of Lina Calamatta
- The Virgin (1842)
- Portrait of Raoul Rochette (1843) at musée national du château de Compiègne, Compiègne (France)
- Eudora and Cymadaceus (1844)
- Maurice Sand (1845)
- St. Cecilia (1846) at the musée Ingres in Montauban (France)
- Eve (1848)
- St. Veronica (1851)
- Holy Family with John Baptist and Saint Elisabeth
- Four allegorical paintings depicting The Arts and The Pursuit of Love (circa 1870)
- Night
- An Idyl (1877)
- Dear Grandma (1877)
- Philippa of Hainault (1878)
- Femmes avec Amour

== Bibliography ==
- Chevereau, Anne, Joséphine Calamatta, élève d’Ingres et mère (méconnue) de Lina, Les Amis de George Sand, 1986, N°7, pp. 25–30.
- Clement, Clara Erskine and Hutton, Laurence, Artists of the Nineteenth Century and Their Works. A handbook containing two thousand and fifty biographical sketches, Cambridge, Houghton, Osgood and Company, 1879.
- "Désiré Raoul Rochette". Catholic Encyclopedia. New York: Robert Appleton Company.1913.
- Fortune, Jane, Invisible Women: Forgotten Artists of Florence, Florence, The Florentine Press, 2009, ISBN 978-88-902434-5-5
- Hart, Charles Henry; Biddle, Edward (1911). Memoirs of the Life and Works of Jean Antoine Houdon: The Sculptor of Voltaire and of Washington. Princeton University, Kessinger Publishing, 2006, ISBN 9781425499891
- "Luigi Calamatta". Dizionario Biografico degli Italiani - Volume 16 (1973)
- Poulet, Ann L. (2003). Jean-Antoine Houdon: Sculptor of the Enlightenment, University of Chicago Press, ISBN 0-226-67647-1.
