= Paolo Mercuri =

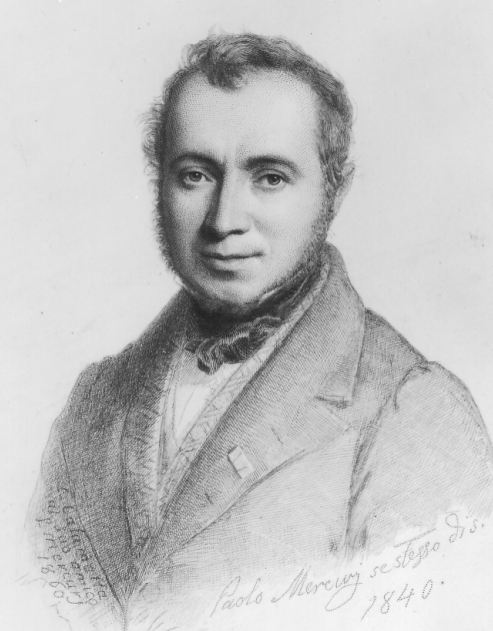
Paolo Mercuri, by Luigi Calamatta (1840)

Paolo Baldassarre Mercuri (20 December 1804, in Rome – 30 April 1884, in Bucharest) was an Italian engraver and illustrator.

== Biography ==
He was born to Vincenzo Mercuri, a farmer, and his wife Barbara née Battaglia. A few years after his birth, during the French occupation of the Papal States, they were forced to sell their farm and move to Marino, where they rented a vineyard and lived in the vacated Augustinian Convent. He first displayed his artistic talent by sketching some of the ancient artworks the friars had left behind.

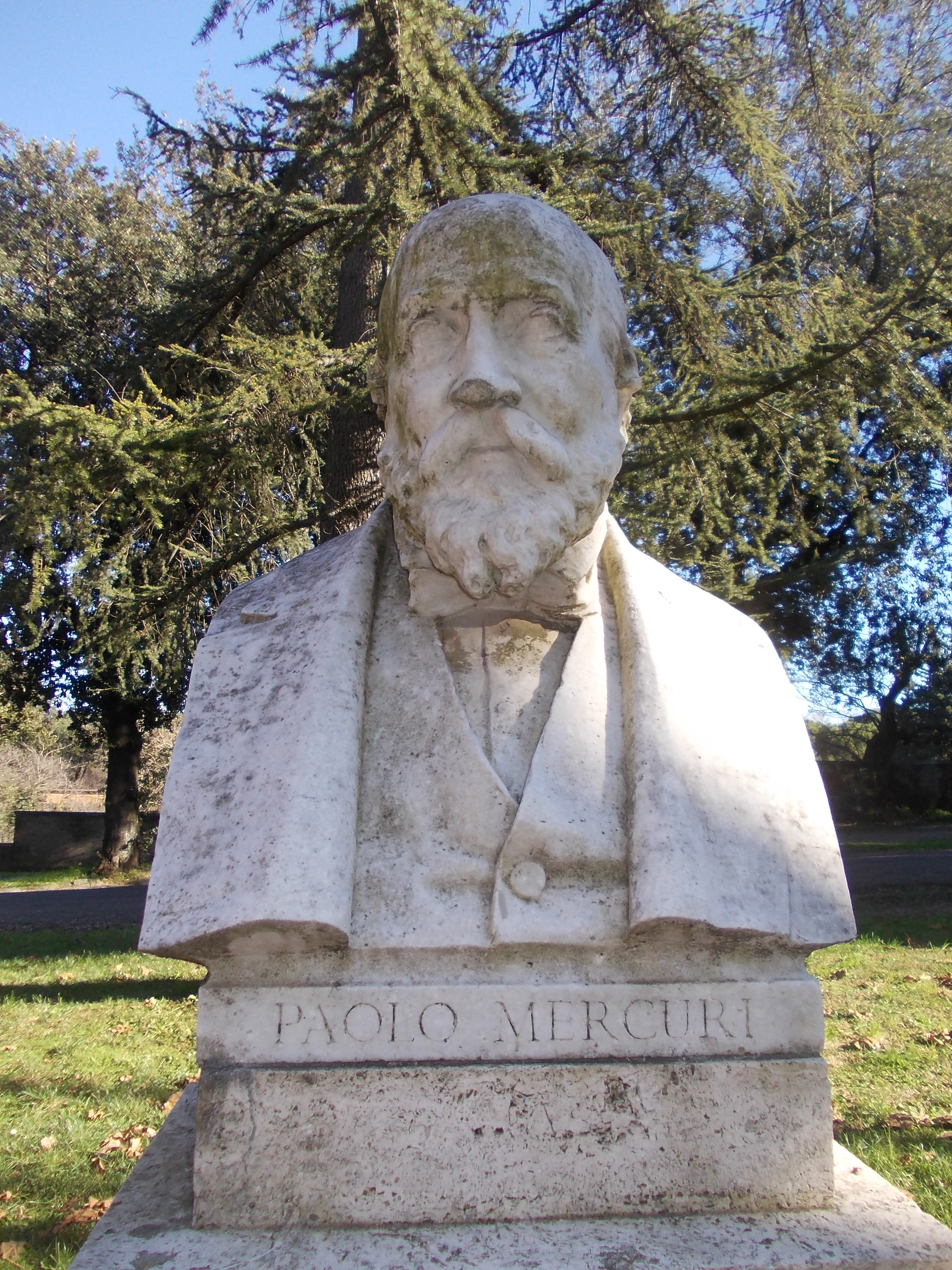
Bust of Mercuri on the Pincian Hill

In 1816, he entered a boarding school at the San Michele a Ripa hospice. There, he studied engraving with Antonio Ricciani. He was also able to attend drawing classes taught by Tommaso Minardi at the Accademia di San Luca. During this time, he became familiar with the works of Michelangelo and Raphael at the Vatican. In 1820, he was nominated for a merit award. He completed his studies in 1825. His first commission came from the French writer and collector, Félix-Sébastien Feuillet de Conches, who was visiting Italy. This involved creating some illustrations for La Fontaine's Fables. The proposed book was never published, but the drawings are now part of the collection at the Musée Jean de La Fontaine.

Although he received offers of work in London and Madrid, he chose to remain in Rome. In 1829 the French publisher, Camille Bonnard, awarded him a commission to portray two-hundred Medieval Italian costumes and uniforms. In 1830, he went to Paris to complete the project, and decided to settle there. He remained until 1848, sharing a studio with Luigi Calamatta, a former schoolmate. During this time, he produced numerous works, mostly on commission, and was awarded a gold medal at the Salon of 1838 at the Louvre. Bonnard's book, Costumes historiques des XIIe, XIIIe, XIVe et XVe siècles, would not be published until 1860.

In 1847, by recommendation from his former teacher, Minardi, Pope Pius IX appointed him master of engraving at the "Calcografia Camerale", an official publisher of old plates. He returned to Rome the following year. Shortly after, he became Director of the school. In 1850, he married Anna Maria Cenci, who came from an old, noble family. They had three children but only one, their daughter Enrichetta, survived infancy. In 1877, she married a Romanian lawyer and moved to Bucharest.

In 1872, after a long tenure devoted to conservation and restoration, Tommaso Aloysio Juvara was named his co-director. Three years later, the largely honorary office of President was created for him. In 1881, he resigned and moved to Bucharest to be with his daughter. He died there in 1884, at the age of seventy-nine. His body was returned to Rome for burial.

Streets in Rome and Marino have been named after him and, since 1921, there has been a "Paolo Mercuri State Art Institute" in Marino.

== Selected works ==
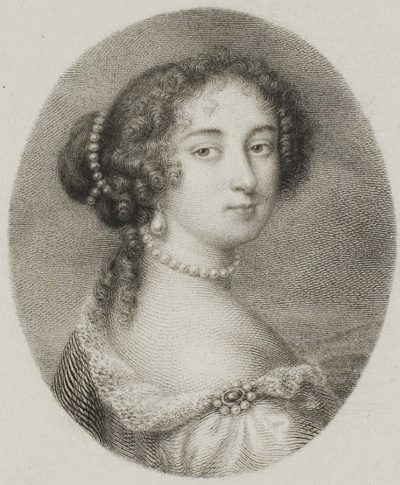
Madame de Maintenon, after Pierre Mignard

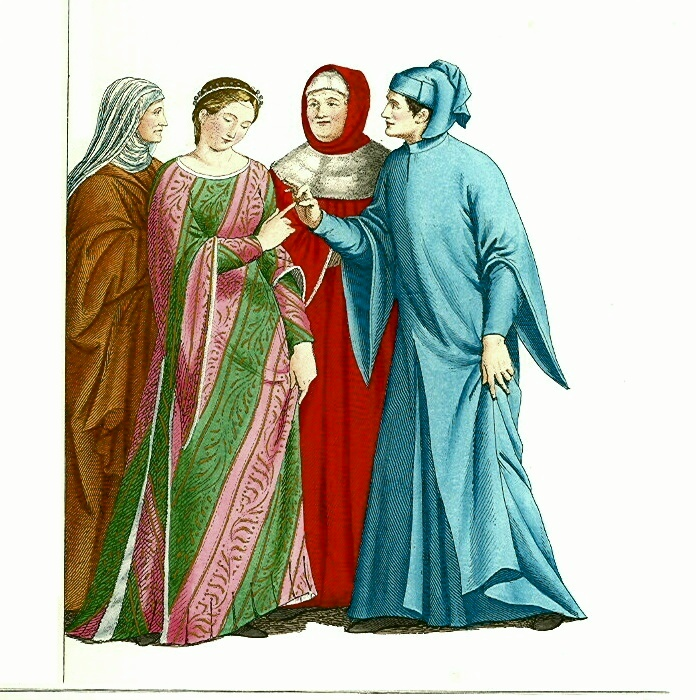
People in Medieval costume

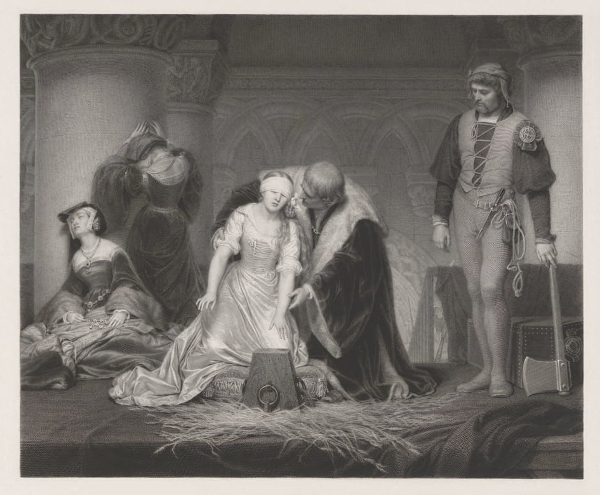
The Execution of Lady Jane Grey

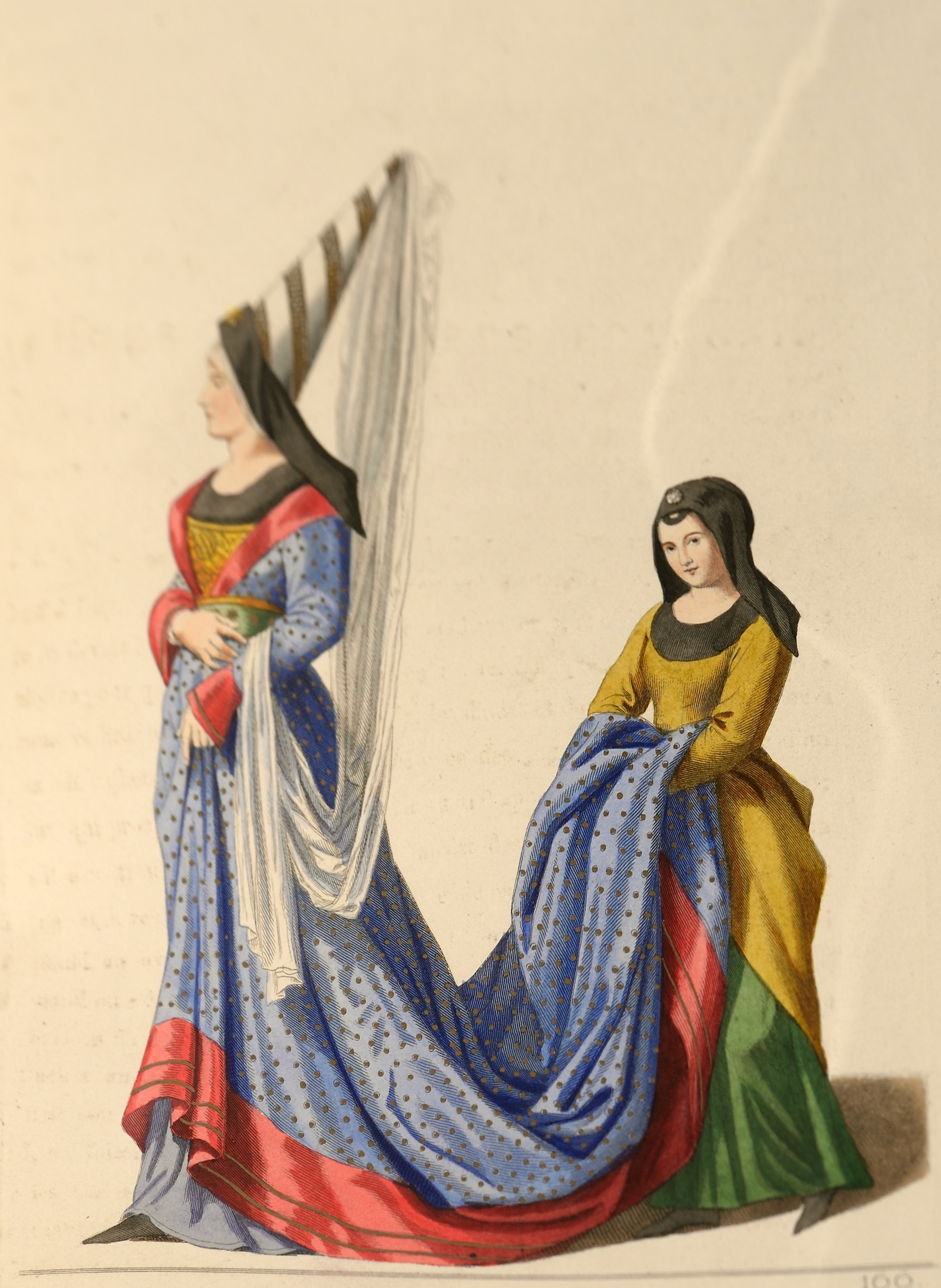
Renaissance women

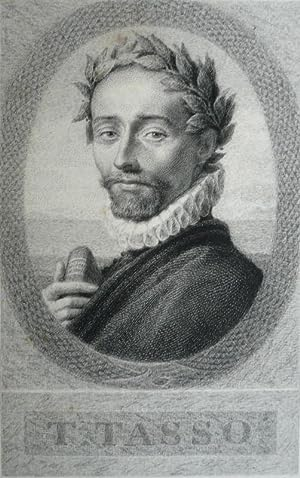
Torquato Tasso
