= Luigi Calamatta =

Italian painter

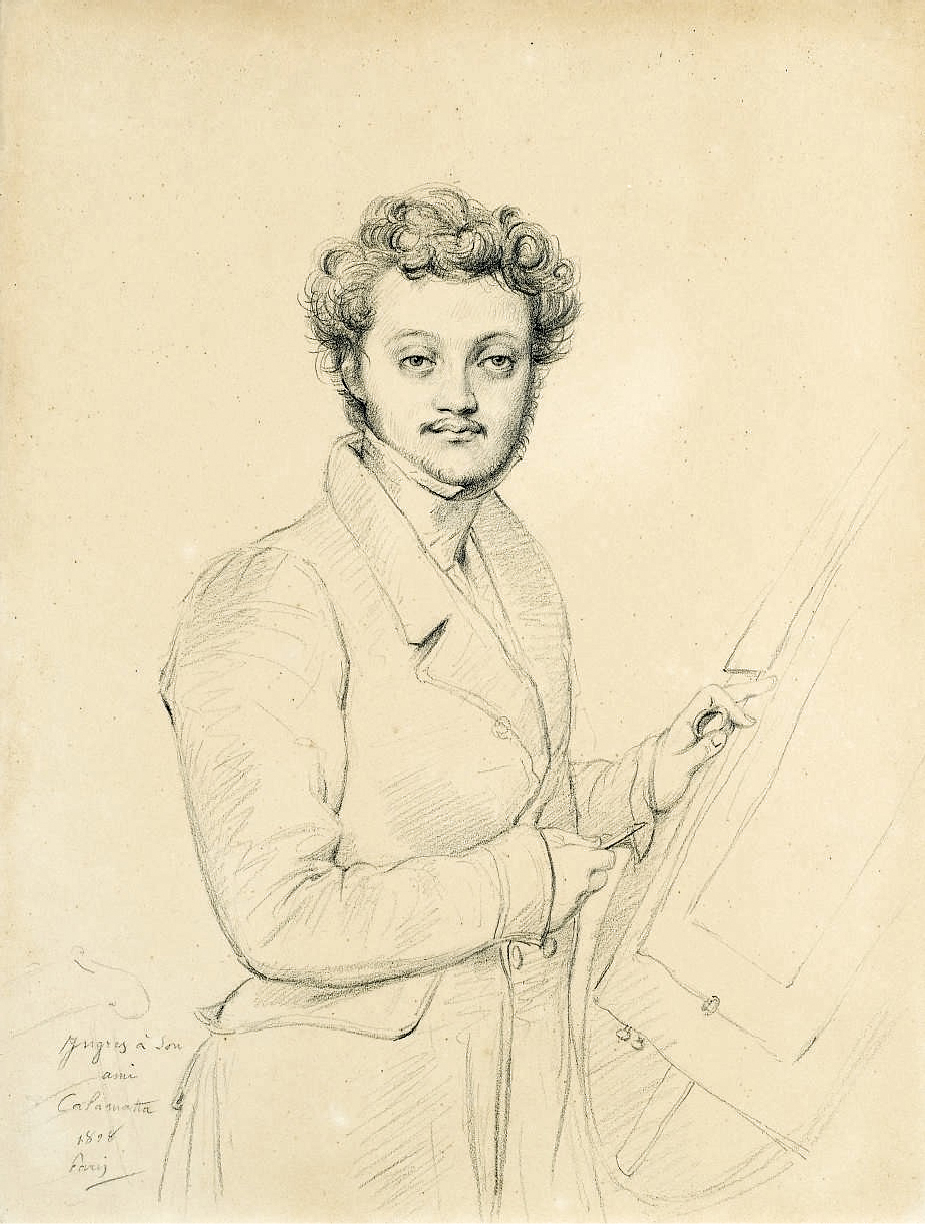
Self-portrait (?), after a painting by Ingres, 1828

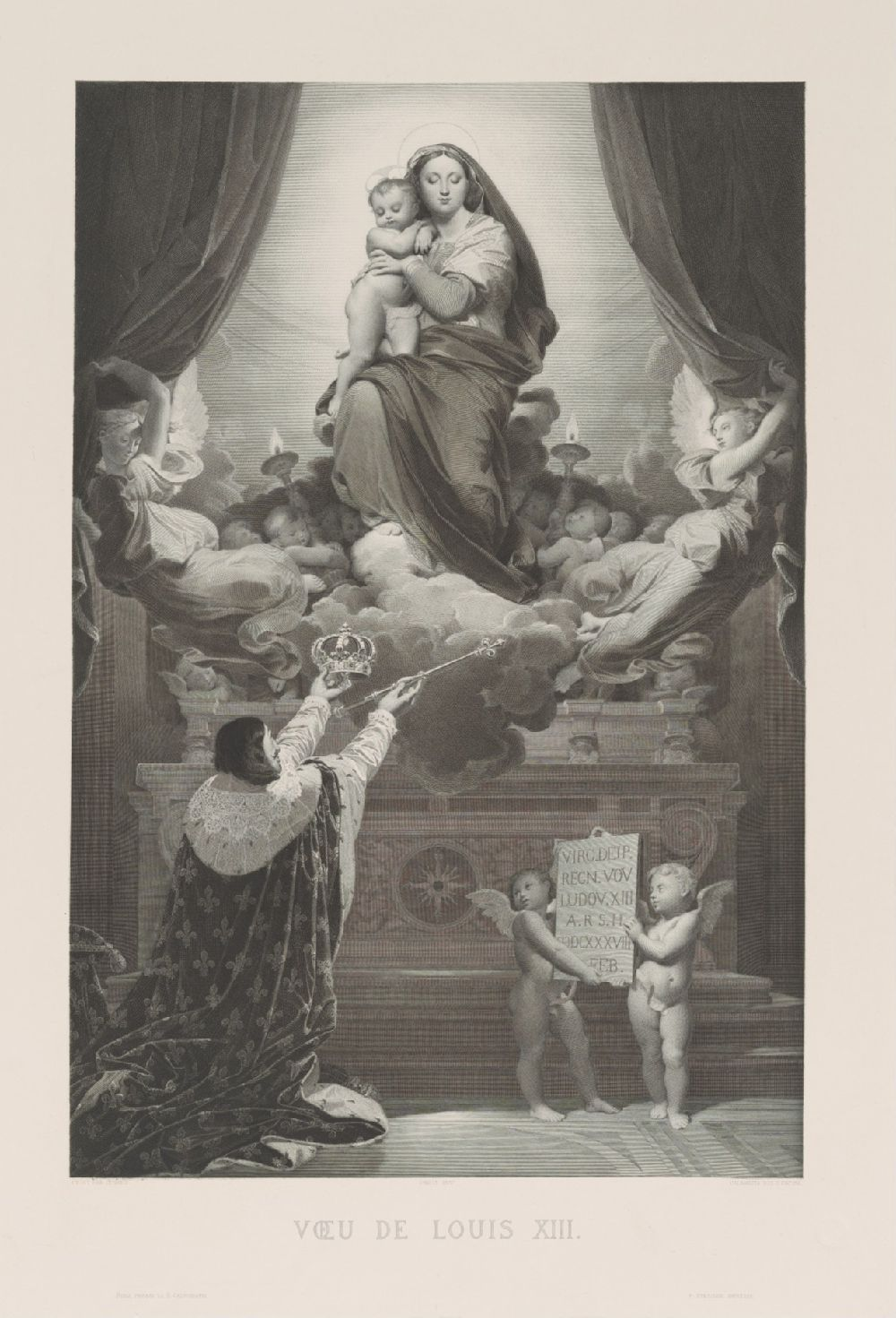
Luigi Calamatta after Jean-Auguste-Dominique Ingres, " The Vow of Louis XIII.," c. 1886/1910, engraving, Department of Image Collections, National Gallery of Art Library, Washington, DC

Luigi Calamatta, also known as Louis Antoine Joseph Calamatta (21 June 1801 – 8 March 1869) was an Italian painter and engraver. He was born at Civitavecchia, in the Papal States and died in Milan.

== Biography ==
He was the son of a port engineer, from a family of former bankers. Orphaned at an early age, he went to live with an uncle, who enrolled him in the school of arts at the Ospizio San Michele, where he learned to draw. He also studied engraving with Francesco Giangiacomo. His exceptional talent led his drawing teacher, Antonio Ricciani, to dissuade him from becoming a priest. Due to disciplinary problems, he was expelled in 1820.

He apparently lived off charity until 1822, when he made his way to Paris. There, he became a student and associate of Ingres, whose style had a significant influence on his work. He made his first appearance at the Salon in 1827, with an engraving of Bajazet and the Shepherd (a scene from a play), after Pierre Joseph Dedreux-Dorcy. In 1834, he was allowed to engrave the historical paintings at the Palace of Versailles.

In 1836, he visited Florence and, the following year, was appointed a professor at the engraving school in Brussels, which later became part of the Royal Academy. His best known students there were Auguste Danse and Léopold Flameng. In 1840, while living in Paris, he married the artist Joséphine Rochette, daughter of the archaeologist, Desiré-Raoul Rochette. She abandoned him in 1852, after he returned to Italy, and took their daughter Lina back to Paris. In 1857, he was named a member of the Pontifical Academy of Fine Arts and Letters of the Virtuosi al Pantheon. The following year, he was admitted to the Accademia di San Luca.

By 1860, there was increasing criticism that the engraving school produced too few engravers. He resigned as a result, and the school closed the following year. Shortly after, he was appointed to a similar post at the Brera Academy in Milan. He died there eight years later and was interred at the Cimitero Monumentale di Milano.

== Selected works ==
- Monna Lisa (1837) after Da Vinci.
- Madonna di Foligno Madonna della Sedia, The Vision of Ezekiel, and Peace (1855) after Raphael.
- Our Lord walking on the Sea; after Cigoli
- Francesca da Rimini; after Scheffer.
- Duke of Orleans; Count Molè (1865); The Vow of Louis XIII; and Madmouiselle Boimara; after Ingres
- Guizot; after Delaroche.
- Portraits of Actor and Miss Lèvera; after Deveria.
- Portrait of Lamennais; after Ary Scheffer.
- Beatrice Cenci (1857) after Guido Reni.
- Recollections of Rome, partly etched; after Stevens
- Portraits of Rubens, George Sand, and Ingres.
- Portrait of the King of Spain; after Madrazo.
