= Arco della Vittoria =

Memorial arch in Genoa, Italy

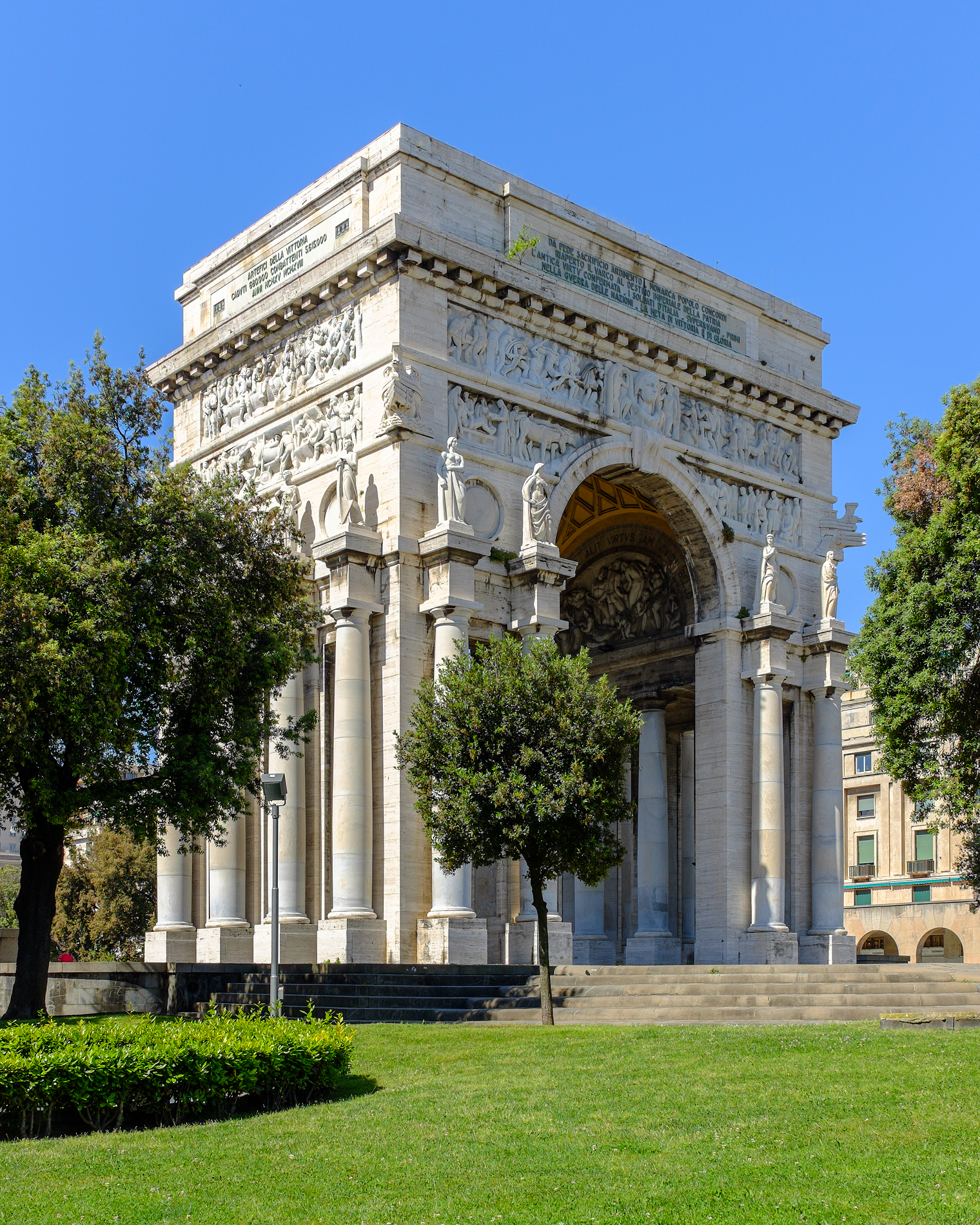
- View of the Arco della Vittoria
- Interactive map of the Arco della Vittoria area
- Alternative names: Monumento ai Caduti; Arco dei Caduti

General information
- Status: Intact
- Type: Memorial arch
- Architectural style: Fascist
- Location: Genoa, Italy
- Coordinates: 44°24′11.1″N 8°56′41.9″E
- Inaugurated: 31 May 1931

Design and construction
- Architect: Marcello Piacentini

The Arco della Vittoria (Victory Arch), also known as the Monument to the Fallen (Monumento ai Caduti) or Arch of the Fallen (Arco dei Caduti), is a memorial monument located in Piazza della Vittoria in Genoa. It was erected in memory of the Genoese who fell during World War I.

The work was designed by the architect Marcello Piacentini with the collaboration of the sculptor Arturo Dazzi. Inaugurated on 31 May, it represents one of the principal examples of monumental architecture from the Fascist period in Italy.

The imposing structure, built of Istrian stone, draws inspiration from the models of classical Roman and Renaissance architecture. It houses an internal crypt-mausoleum (cripta-sacrario) containing an altar and reliefs dedicated to the fallen. The monument, which served as a symbol of memory and the patriotic rhetoric of the regime, is today considered a central element of Genoa's historical and architectural heritage.

== History ==
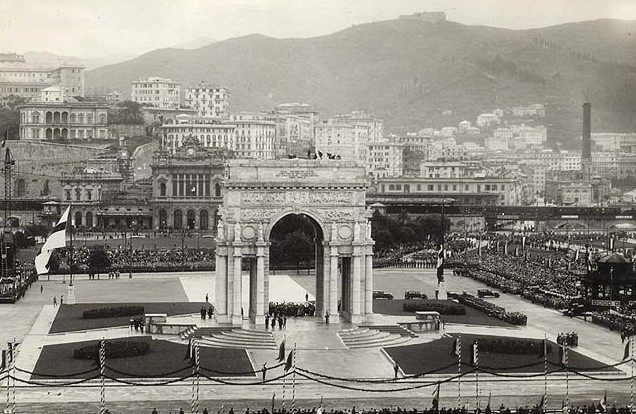
The inauguration of the Arco della Vittoria, which took place on 31 May 1931

Construction of the Arco della Vittoria began in 1923, when the Genoa City Council (Comune di Genova) launched a national competition for the creation of a monument dedicated to the fallen of World War I. The chosen area, the current Piazza della Vittoria, was originally a grassy esplanade along the valley of the Bisagno, which had not yet been covered over and was subject to frequent flooding. On that occasion, the city administration initiated an extensive urban redevelopment plan that included covering the terminal section of the stream and transforming the entire area into a large monumental space.

Sixteen projects participated in the competition, from which the proposal by the architect Marcello Piacentini and the sculptor Arturo Dazzi was selected in the second phase. The judging commission appreciated its classicizing approach, which combined elements of Imperial Rome and the sixteenth century (Cinquecento), lending the monument a solemn, heroic, and triumphal character.

The original project, presented in 1924, envisioned a large triumphal arch set upon a raised semicircular platform, featuring ramps and steps that emphasized its monumental scale. The structure was conceived as the scenic focal point of the future piazza, intended to become the city's main celebratory space. Two years later, in 1926, Piacentini himself simplified the original design, making the structure more essential and austere, in line with the new directives of monumental taste during the Fascist era.

Construction was entrusted to the Genoese firm Garbarino and Sciaccaluga and personally directed by Piacentini. The work was completed in 1931, and was inaugurated on 31 May of the same year, in the presence of civil and military authorities.

== Architecture and dimensions ==
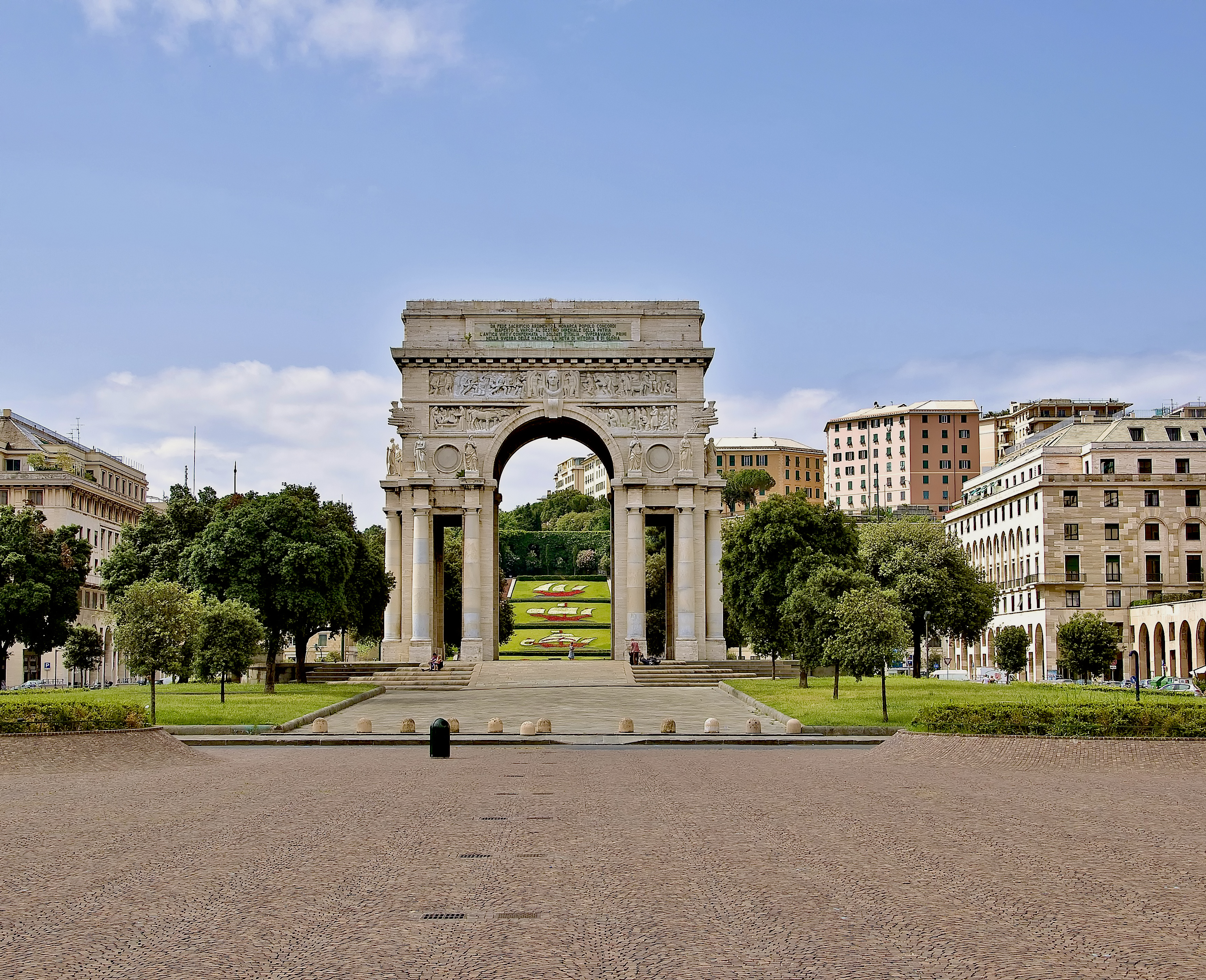
The Arco della Vittoria in the center of Piazza della Vittoria.

The arch, which stands 27 meters (89 ft) tall, is situated at the terminus of a semicircular ramp, the angles of which feature a six-step staircase. The monument rests on an elliptical base at the center of the Piazza della Vittoria.

The structure is supported externally by a total of twelve quadrangular pillars (four corner and eight ornate) and is fronted by sixteen Doric columns terminating in Doric capitals. These capitals support sculptures of the allegorical figures of Fame, works by Arturo Dazzi and Edoardo De Albertis. The corners at the level of the lower frieze are emphasized by rostra (ramming spurs), referencing Roman trophies.

Two large doors open at the base of the structure, leading to the underground crypt and sanctuary.

== Sculpture and iconography ==
The monument is richly decorated with sculptures, friezes, and inscriptions detailing the military history of the conflict and honoring the fallen.

=== Interior and crypt ===
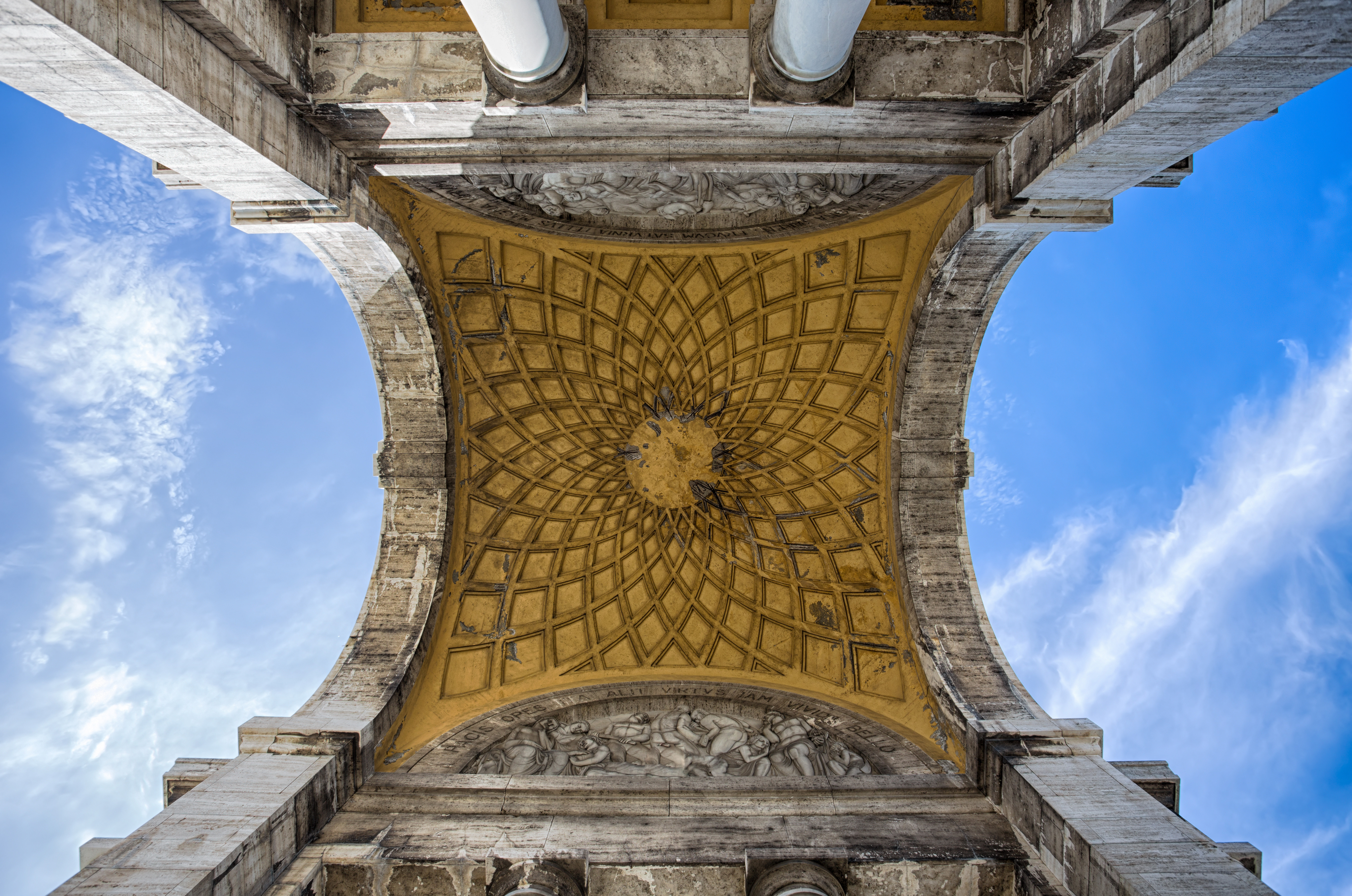
Detail of the interior bronze crucifix and altar

The arch houses an internal sanctuary and crypt (sacrario), dedicated to the 680,000 Italian soldiers who died during the conflict.

- Altar: The central altar is crafted from Levanto red marble. Above it hangs a bronze crucifix on a rosewood cross, a work by the sculptor Edoardo De Albertis.
- Sculpture: The sanctuary contains sculptures by Giovanni Prini depicting *Victories*, Saint George, and the Stemma di Genova. Prini also contributed other sculptures, including reproductions of the Bollettino della Vittoria (Victory Bulletin), the Bollettino della Marina (Navy Bulletin), and the lists of all the names of the fallen.
- Lunettes: Inside the archway, two large internal columns support two lunettes sculpted by Prini, which are dedicated to the themes of peace and family.
- Vault: The internal ceiling is dome-shaped, colored yellow, and decorated with a kaleidoscope of curved lines culminating in a central circle.

Along the edges of the vault are two Latin inscriptions:

- PACIS OPES ITA ALIT VIRTUS IAM VIVIDA BELLO

   The virtue thus nourishes the riches of peace, now vivid in war

- SALVE MAGNA PARENS FRUGUM SATURNIA TELLUS MAGNA VIRUM — (Virgil, Georgics 136–176)

   Hail, great Saturnian land, rich in fertile fields, great mother of men.

=== Exterior friezes ===
The exterior features allegories sculpted by Arturo Dazzi, accompanied by four inscriptions, two of which were written by Mario Maria Martini. The inscriptions commemorate the 680,000 Italians killed in the Great War and the date of the monument's erection. An inscription along the attica includes a dedication to the "sons who died for the fatherland fighting on land, sea, and air... 1915–1918."

Dazzi's large frieze encircles the monument, depicting various episodes and branches of the Italian military:

- North side: Features machine gunners and the Alpini (mountain troops). On the sides of the arch key are representations of the Red Cross and a field mass.
- South side: Depicts the artillery and the cavalry. The sides of the arch feature scenes from the Battles of the Isonzo and the Piave.
- West side: Represents the Bersaglieri and the sappers/pontoon engineers. A controversial figure depicting one of the soldiers with the facial features of Benito Mussolini was subsequently abraded (erased) after World War II.
- East side: Features the Air Force (Aviation) and the Navy.

== Gallery ==
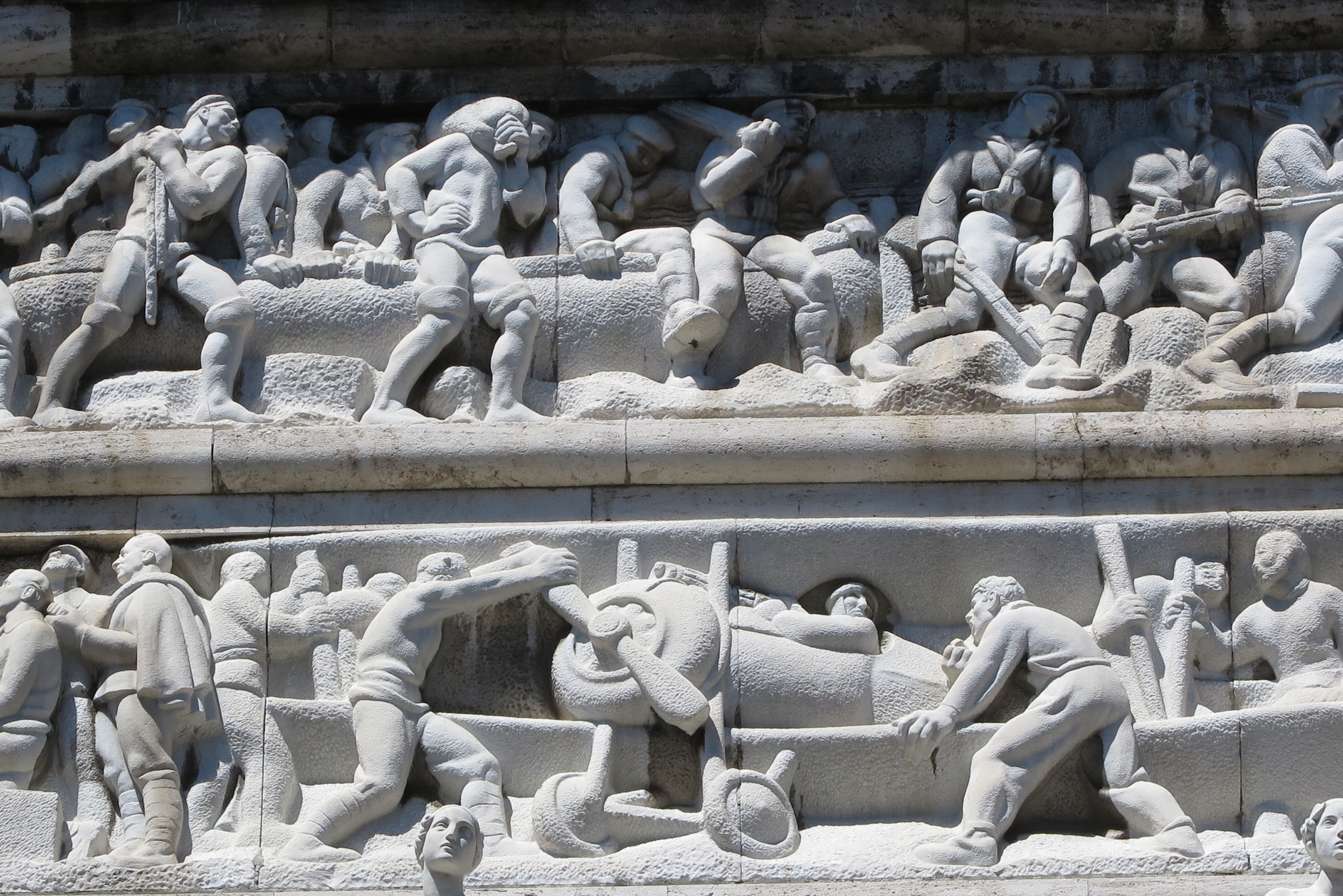
Detail of the allegories

Frontal diagram of the arch (North side)
