= Letterio Catapano =

Italian footballer

Personal information
- Place of birth: Italy
- Position: Midfielder

Senior career*
Years	Team	Apps	(Gls)
1922–1926	A.S. Taranto Calcio	?	(?)
1926–1929	S.S.C. Napoli	30	(0)
1929–1930	Paganese Calcio 1926	?	(?)
1930–1932	F.C. Catanzaro	?	(?)
1932–1933	Ascoli Calcio 1898	?	(?)
- * Club domestic league appearances and goals

Letterio Catapano was an Italian footballer who played as a midfielder. He was one of the S.S.C. Napoli's first players.

After spells with A.S. Taranto Calcio, he made a move to S.S.C. Napoli in 1926, where he played for three seasons in the Divisione Nazionale. He made his debut in the club's first ever competitive fixture, a 3–0 defeat at home to Inter Milan on 3 October 1926. He continued to play all eighteen games of the 1926–27 Divisione Nazionale season, all but one of which ended in defeat. In 1927–28, Catapano played in the 4–0 win over Reggiana on 25 September 1927, the club's first ever top-flight victory. He made just two appearances in his final season with the club, and moved on to Paganese Calcio 1926 in 1929 and to F.C. Catanzaro in 1930. He finished his career at Ascoli Calcio 1898, retiring in 1933.

== See also ==
- Football in Italy
- List of football clubs in Italy
