= Letterio Subba =

Italian painter and sculptor (1787–1868)

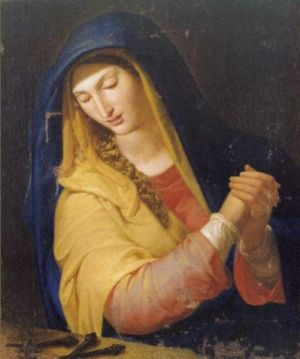
L'Addolorata

Letterio Subba (1787 – 11 January 1868) was an Italian Romantic painter. He was born and died in Messina.

== Life ==
He received a rigidly academic education, initially in Naples, then in Rome and Florence. During his stay in Rome he produced two small paintings, Interior of Canova's Studio during his Sculpting of "Theseus" (painted from life in 1819 and now in the museo regionale di Messina) and Interior of Thorvaldsen's Studio during his Modelling of "The Three Graces" (now lost). He also excelled in engraving and watercolour.

He returned to his birthplace in 1823 and its city council authorised him to open a drawing and painting school near the Regia Accademia Carolina. The Bourbon government later made him director of the university's Scuola di belle Arti, attended by a whole generation of artists from the city. One of his pupils was Giuseppe Prinzi.

In 1834 he and his brother Francesco produced a bronze sculpture of Francis I of the Two Sicilies, melted down for cannonballs in 1848. Around the same time he produced watercolours linked to the Greek War of Independence. In 1844 he designed the Teatro Mandanici in Barcellona Pozzo di Gotto and led the construction work on it. In 1848 he took part in the Revolt of Messina, but it failed, forcing him to flee to Malta, leaving the Scuola di belle Arti in the hands of Michele Panebianco. He was pardoned and in 1854 returned to Messina, working right up to his death.

== Works ==
Much of his oeuvre was destroyed in the 1908 Messina earthquake. Four of his surviving secular works are now in the Museo regionale di Messina – The Goddess Calypso Welcoming Telemachus (1830) and the undated Cupid and Psyche, The Nymphs Laipizia and Fetusa receiving the First Hare Killed by Orion, Founder of Messina and Foundation of the Compagnia dei verdi. Another, Blind Daphnis Among the Shepherds, is in the Agostino Gallo collection in the Galleria regionale della Sicilia in Palermo.

He was particularly active in religious art:

- 1828, Madonna and Child, Duomo di Sant'Agata, Alì.
- 1828, Saints and the Good Shepherds, Duomo di Sant'Agata, Alì.
- 1837, The Virgin Mary Saves Messina from Cholera, fresco lost in the 1908 earthquake; sketch survives in the collections of Messina Cathedral.
- 1837, L'Addolorata, Museo regionale di Messina.
- 1840, Mary Magdalene at Christ's Feet, Museo regionale di Messina.
- 1848c., Fresco cycle (St Paul Preaching, St Paul with Ananias and St Paul Caught Up to the Third Heaven); produced on Malta; now in the central nave of the collegiata di San Paolo Naufrago in La Valletta.
- Nativity of the Virgin, Museo regionale di Messina.
- Embassy to the Virgin from the Citizens of Messina, Museo regionale di Messina.

His sculptures included:

- Francis I of the Two Sicilies, bronze statue, destroyed in 1848
- Saturn and the Mamertine Genius, destroyed in the 1908 earthquake.
- 1860, Scylla, copy of Scylla by Giovanni Angelo Montorsoli from Messina's Fontana del Nettuno.

He also headed the restoration of Alonzo Rodriguez's major fresco of the Last Supper from the refectory of the convento di Santa Maria di Gesù Inferiore and housed in the sala della Giunta of Messina's town hall.
