= Pygmalion =

Pygmalion or Pigmalion may refer to:

== Mythology ==
- Pygmalion (mythology), a sculptor who fell in love with his statue

== Stage ==
- Pygmalion (Rameau), a 1745 opera by Jean-Philippe Rameau
- Pygmalion (Rousseau), a 1762 melodrama by Jean-Jacques Rousseau
- Pygmalion (Benda), a 1779 duodrama opera by Georg Anton Benda
- Pygmalion, an 1808 opera by Karol Kurpiński
- Pimmalione, an 1809 opera by Luigi Cherubini
- Il Pigmalione, an 1816 opera by Gaetano Donizetti
- Die schöne Galathée, an 1865 operetta by Franz von Suppé
- Pygmalion; or, The Statue Fair, an 1867 musical burlesque by William Brough
- Pygmalion, ou La Statue de Chypre, an 1883 ballet with choreography by Marius Petipa
- Pygmalion (play), a 1913 play by George Bernard Shaw

== Film and television ==
- Pygmalion (1935 film), a German film based on the George Bernard Shaw play
- Pygmalion (1937 film), a Dutch film based on the George Bernard Shaw play
- Pygmalion (1938 film), a British film starring Leslie Howard and Wendy Hiller
- Pygmalion (1948 TV play), a British television play starring Margaret Lockwood
- Pygmalion (1983 film), a television film starring Peter O'Toole and Margot Kidder

== Music ==
- Pygmalion (album), an experimental ambient album by Slowdive
- Pygmalion (ensemble), French baroque ensemble
- "Pygmalion", a song by the darkwave group Lycia (band)
- "Pygmalion", a song from the 2001 album Doll Doll Doll by Venetian Snares

== People ==
- Pygmalion of Tyre, a King of Tyre

== Other uses ==
- 96189 Pygmalion, a near-Earth asteroid
- Pygmalion, a narrative work by Thomas Woolner (1880s)
- "Pigmalion" (Back at the Barnyard episode), a 2008 episode of the Nickelodeon animated television series Back at the Barnyard
- "Pigmalion", a 2003 episode of Mike Judge’s animated television series King of the Hill
- Pygmalion publishing

== See also ==
- Pygmalion and Galatea (disambiguation)
- Pygmalion and the Image series, a series of four paintings by Sir Edward Coley Burne-Jones (1878)
- Pygmalion effect
- Pygmalionism
- My Fair Lady (disambiguation)
- All pages with titles containing "Pygmalion" or "Pigmalion"
