= Monument to Verdi, Milan =

Statue in Milan, Italy

Coordinates: 45.47036°N 9.15540°E

Monument to Giuseppe Verdi
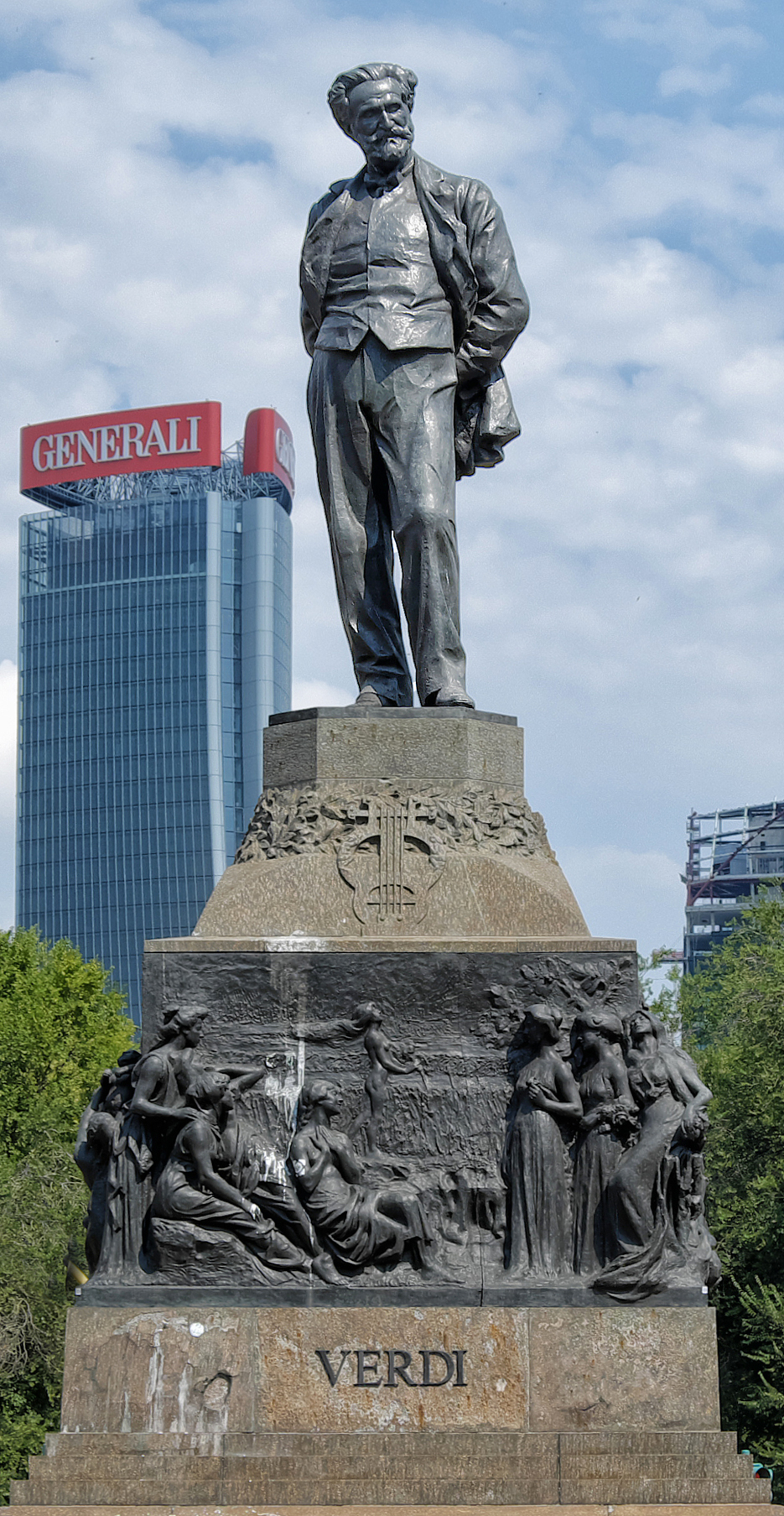
- Interactive map of Monument to Giuseppe Verdi
- Location: Piazza Michelangelo Buonarroti, Milan, Italy
- Designer: Enrico Butti
- Type: Statue and plinth
- Material: Bronze
- Height: 2.13 metres (7 ft 0 in)
- Dedicated date: 10 October 1913
- Dedicated to: Giuseppe Verdi

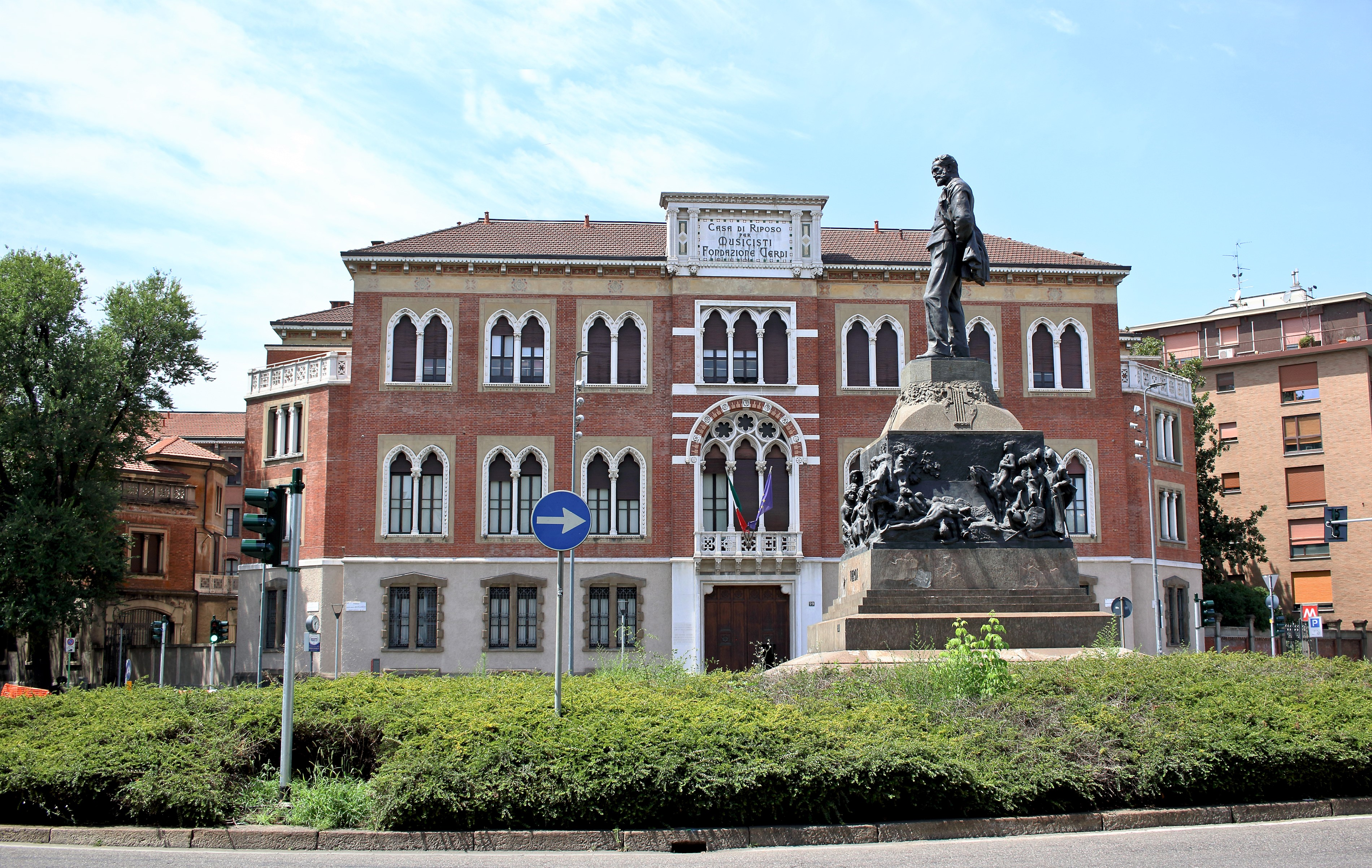
Monument in front of Casa di Riposo per Musicisti

The Monument to Giuseppe Verdi is a bronze sculpture on a plinth located in Piazza Michelangelo Buonarroti in Milan, Italy. The statue stands in front of the Casa di Riposo per Musicisti (nursing home for musicians) which had been founded by Giuseppe Verdi, and where he is buried.

A contest was announced for proposals for a monument, to be judged by a committee named by members of the Brera Academy. Initially the proposal of Antonio Carminati was selected but the sculptor died two years later. His model recalls a more expansive monument such as the 1897 Donizetti Monument by Francesco Jerace, but this time placing a sitting Verdi in the center of a rounded screen, flanked by two musical figures and a linear display of bas reliefs.

The monument dedicated to the Italian opera composer was created by Italian sculptor Enrico Butti and it was inaugurated on 10 October 1913, on the hundredth anniversary of the composer's birth. The work is far less formal than Carminati's project, with Verdi pausing while standing with hands clasped under his jacket behind his back. The base of the statue are four allegorical reliefs:

- 1) in the front is Melody, represented by a young woman walking through a meadow of flowers between two groups of female figures;
- 2) on the right is Peace, symbolized a man and a woman holding hands with a ring of playing children and an ox all in a pastoral alpine setting;
- 3) on the left is Poetry, symbolized by survivors of a patriotic battle;
- 4) on the back is Tragedy, symbolized by images of suffering and pain.
