= May 13 =

May 13 this year in various calendars
- Wednesday, 13 May 2026
Akan	Nkyiwukuo
Armenian	27 Mareri 1475
Aztec	Ochpaniztli 3, 7 Ozomahtli
Babylonian	25 Nisanu, 2337 SE
Balinese pawukon	Luang, Pepet, Kajeng, Jaya, Keliwon, Urukung, Buda of Gumbreg, Kala, Dadi, Manuh
Bengali	30 Boisakh, BS 1433
Chinese	Yin Fire Pig・Wall Mansion; Fire Horse Year, Month 3, Day 27 (Lixia, 8 days until Xiaoman)
Common Era	13 May 2026 CE
Coptic	5 Pashons, AM 1742
Egyptian	27 Thoth, 2775 NE
Ethiopian	5 Genbot, 2018 Amätä Məhrät
French Republican	Décade III, Quartidi de Floréal de l'Année 234 de la République
Gregorian	13 May, AD 2026
Hebrew	26 Iyar, AM 5786; Omer 41
Hindu	Uttarabhādrapada・Viṣkambha; Solar: 30 Vaiśākha, 1948 SE; Lunisolar: Ekādaśī, Kṛishna pakṣa of Vaiśākha, 2083 VE; Rāudra・5127 KY・1,872,708
Icelandic	Miðvikudagur, 21 Harpa 2026
Islamic	26 Dhu al-Qi'dah, AH 1447 (using tabular method)
ISO week date	2026-W20-3
Japanese	27 Yayoi, Reiwa 8 (Rikka, 8 days until Shōman)
Julian	30 April, AD 2026 (AM 7534)
Julian day	2461174
Korean	27 Yongdal, 4359 DE
Maya	13.0.13.10.11; 4 Zip, 7 Chuen
Roman	Pridie Kalendas Maias, MMDCCLXXIX AUC
Solar Hijri	23 Ordibehesht, SH 1405
Tibetan	26 nag pa, me pho rta 2153 or 1772 or 1000

<<	May					>>
Su	Mo	Tu	We	Th	Fr	Sa
					1	2
3	4	5	6	7	8	9
10	11	12	13	14	15	16
17	18	19	20	21	22	23
24	25	26	27	28	29	30
31
2026

May 13 in recent years
2026 (Wednesday)
2025 (Tuesday)
2024 (Monday)
2023 (Saturday)
2022 (Friday)
2021 (Thursday)
2020 (Wednesday)
2019 (Monday)
2018 (Sunday)
2017 (Saturday)

May 13 is the 133rd day of the year (134th in leap years) in the Gregorian calendar; 232 days remain until the end of the year.

== Events ==
=== Pre-1600 ===
- 535 – Election of pope Agapetus I following the death of pope John II earlier that month.
- 1110 – Baldwin I of Jerusalem captures the city of Beirut from the Fatimid Caliphate with the help of a Genoese fleet.
- 1344 – A Latin Christian fleet defeats a Turkish fleet in the battle of Pallene during the Smyrniote crusades.
- 1373 – Julian of Norwich has visions of Jesus while suffering from a life-threatening illness, visions which are later described and interpreted in her book Revelations of Divine Love.
- 1501 – Amerigo Vespucci, this time under Portuguese flag, sets sail for western lands.
- 1568 – Mary, Queen of Scots, is defeated at the Battle of Langside, part of the civil war between Queen Mary and the supporters of her son, James VI.

=== 1601–1900 ===
- 1612 – Sword duel between Miyamoto Musashi and Sasaki Kojiro on the shores of Ganryū Island. Kojiro dies at the end.
- 1619 – Dutch statesman Johan van Oldenbarnevelt is executed in The Hague after being convicted of treason.
- 1654 – A Venetian fleet under Admiral Cort Adeler breaks through a line of galleys and defeats the Turkish navy.
- 1779 – War of the Bavarian Succession: Russian and French mediators at the Congress of Teschen negotiate an end to the war. In the agreement Austria acquires the Innviertel.
- 1780 – The Cumberland Compact is signed by leaders of the settlers in the Cumberland River area of what would become the U.S. state of Tennessee, providing for democratic government and a formal system of justice.
- 1791 – The British under Charles Cornwallis defeat a Mysorean army under Tipu Sultan in the battle of Arakere.
- 1804 – Forces sent by Yusuf Karamanli of Tripoli to retake Derna from the Americans attack the city.
- 1830 – Ecuador gains its independence from Gran Colombia.
- 1846 – Mexican–American War: The United States declares war on the Federal Republic of Mexico following a dispute over the American annexation of the Republic of Texas and a Mexican military incursion.
- 1858 – Montenegrin forces under Grand Duke Mirko Petrović-Njegoš defeat an Ottoman army under Hussein Pasha in the battle of Grahovac. The battle is a significant step towards formal independence and quickly becomes a part of national folklore.
- 1861 – American Civil War: Queen Victoria of the United Kingdom issues a "proclamation of neutrality" which recognizes the Confederacy as having belligerent rights.
- 1861 – The Great Comet of 1861 is discovered by John Tebbutt of Windsor, New South Wales, Australia.
- 1861 – Pakistan's (then a part of British India) first railway line opens, from Karachi to Kotri.
- 1862 – Southern slave Robert Smalls steals the steamboat Planter, spirits it through Confederate lines and hands it to the United States Navy, who quickly commission it as the gunboat USS Planter and appoint Smalls as captain, thus making him the first black man to command a United States ship.
- 1888 – With the passage of the Lei Áurea ("Golden Law"), the Empire of Brazil abolishes slavery.

=== 1901–present ===
- 1909 – The first edition of the Giro d'Italia, a long-distance multiple-stage bicycle race, begins in Milan; the Italian cyclist Luigi Ganna was the eventual winner.
- 1912 – The Royal Flying Corps, the forerunner of the Royal Air Force, is established in the United Kingdom.
- 1917 – Three children report the first apparition of Our Lady of Fátima in Fátima, Portugal.
- 1940 – World War II: Germany's conquest of France begins, as the German army crosses the Meuse. Winston Churchill makes his "blood, toil, tears, and sweat" speech to the House of Commons.
- 1943 – World War II: Operations Vulcan and Strike force the surrender of the last Axis troops in Tunisia.
- 1945 – World War II: Yevgeny Khaldei's photograph Raising a Flag over the Reichstag is published in Ogonyok magazine.
- 1948 – Arab–Israeli War: The Kfar Etzion massacre occurs, a day prior to the Israeli Declaration of Independence.
- 1949 – Aeroflot Flight 17 crashes on approach to Severny Airport in Novosibirsk, killing 25.
- 1950 – The inaugural Formula One World Championship race takes place at Silverstone Circuit. The race was won by Giuseppe Farina, who would go on to become the inaugural champion that year.
- 1951 – The 400th anniversary of the founding of the National University of San Marcos is commemorated by the opening of the first large-capacity stadium in Peru.
- 1952 – The Rajya Sabha, the upper house of the Parliament of India, holds its first sitting.
- 1954 – The anti-National Service Riots, by Chinese middle school students in Singapore, take place.
- 1958 – During a visit to Caracas, Venezuela, the US Vice President Richard Nixon's car is attacked by anti-American demonstrators.
- 1958 – May 1958 crisis: A group of French military officers lead a coup in Algiers demanding that a government of national unity be formed with Charles de Gaulle at its head in order to defend French control of Algeria.
- 1958 – Ben Carlin becomes the first (and only) person to circumnavigate the world by amphibious vehicle, having travelled over 17,000 kilometres (11,000 mi) by sea and 62,000 kilometres (39,000 mi) by land during a ten-year journey.
- 1960 – Hundreds of University of California, Berkeley students congregate for the first day of protest against a visit by the House Committee on Un-American Activities.
- 1967 – Dr. Zakir Husain becomes the third President of India. He is the first Muslim President of the Indian Union. He holds this position until August 24, 1969.
- 1969 – In the aftermath of the 1969 Malaysian general election, Sino-Malay sectarian violence erupts in Kuala Lumpur, Malaysia.
- 1972 – A fire occurs in the Sennichi Department Store in Osaka, Japan. Blocked exits and non-functional elevators result in 118 fatalities (many victims leaping to their deaths).
- 1972 – The Troubles: A car bombing outside a crowded pub in Belfast sparks a two-day gun battle involving the Provisional IRA, Ulster Volunteer Force and British Army. Seven people are killed and over 66 injured.
- 1980 – An F3 tornado hits Kalamazoo County, Michigan. President Jimmy Carter declares it a federal disaster area.
- 1981 – Mehmet Ali Ağca attempts to assassinate Pope John Paul II in St. Peter's Square in Rome. The Pope is rushed to the Agostino Gemelli University Polyclinic to undergo emergency surgery and survives.
- 1985 – Police bomb MOVE headquarters in Philadelphia, killing six adults and five children, and destroying the homes of 250 city residents.
- 1989 – Large groups of students occupy Tiananmen Square and begin a hunger strike.
- 1990 – The Dinamo–Red Star riot takes place at Maksimir Stadium in Zagreb, Croatia, between the Bad Blue Boys (fans of Dinamo Zagreb) and the Delije (fans of Red Star Belgrade).
- 1992 – Li Hongzhi gives the first public lecture on Falun Gong in Changchun, People's Republic of China.
- 1995 – Alison Hargreaves, a 33-year-old British mother, becomes the first woman to ascend Everest without oxygen or the help of sherpas.
- 1996 – Severe thunderstorms and a tornado in Bangladesh kill 600 people.
- 1998 – Race riots break out in Jakarta, Indonesia, where shops owned by Indonesians of Chinese descent are looted and women raped.
- 1998 – India carries out two nuclear weapon tests at Pokhran, following the three conducted on May 11. The United States and Japan impose economic sanctions on India.
- 1999 – Kosovo War: NATO bombs the village of Koriša, killing at least 87 people.
- 2000 – A fireworks storage depot explodes in a residential neighborhood in Enschede, Netherlands, killing 23 people and injuring 950 others.
- 2005 – Andijan uprising, Uzbekistan: Troops open fire on crowds of protestors after a prison break; at least 187 people were killed according to official estimates.
- 2006 – São Paulo violence: Rebellions occur in several prisons in Brazil.
- 2011 – Two bombs explode in the Charsadda District of Pakistan killing 98 people and wounding 140 others.
- 2012 – Forty-nine dismembered bodies are discovered by Mexican authorities on Mexican Federal Highway 40.
- 2013 – American physician Kermit Gosnell is found guilty in Pennsylvania of murdering three infants born alive during attempted abortions, involuntary manslaughter of a woman during an abortion procedure, and other charges.
- 2014 – An explosion at an underground coal mine in southwest Turkey kills 301 miners.

== Births ==
=== Pre-1600 ===
- 1024 – Hugh of Cluny, French abbot and saint (died 1109)
- 1179 – Theobald III, Count of Champagne (died 1201)
- 1221 – Alexander Nevsky, Russian prince and saint (died 1263)
- 1254 – Marie of Brabant, Queen of France (died 1321)
- 1453 – Mary Stewart, Countess of Arran, Scottish princess (died 1488)
- 1588 – Ole Worm, Danish physician and historian (died 1654)

=== 1601–1900 ===
- 1638 – Richard Simon, French priest and scholar (died 1712)
- 1699 – Sebastião José de Carvalho e Melo, 1st Marquis of Pombal, Portuguese politician, Prime Minister of Portugal (died 1782)
- 1712 – Count Johann Hartwig Ernst von Bernstorff, Danish politician and diplomat (died 1772)
- 1713 – Alexis Clairaut, French mathematician, astronomer, and geophysicist (died 1765)
- 1717 – Maria Theresa, Archduchess, Queen, and Empress; Austrian wife of Francis I, Holy Roman Emperor (died 1780)
- 1730 – Charles Watson-Wentworth, 2nd Marquess of Rockingham, English politician, Prime Minister of Great Britain (died 1782)
- 1735 – Horace Coignet, French violinist and composer (died 1821)
- 1742 – Maria Christina, Duchess of Teschen (died 1798)
- 1753 – Lazare Carnot, French general, mathematician, and politician, French Minister of the Interior (died 1823)
- 1792 – Pope Pius IX (died 1878)
- 1794 – Louis Léopold Robert, French painter (died 1835)
- 1795 – Gérard Paul Deshayes, French geologist and chronologist (died 1875)
- 1804 – Per Gustaf Svinhufvud af Qvalstad, treasurer of Tavastia province, manor host, and paternal grandfather of President of Finland P. E. Svinhufvud (died 1866)
- 1811 – Juan Bautista Ceballos, President of Mexico (1853) (died 1859)
- 1822 – Francis, Duke of Cádiz, King Consort of Queen Isabella II of Spain (died 1902)
- 1830 – Zebulon Baird Vance, American colonel, lawyer, and politician, 37th Governor of North Carolina (died 1894)
- 1832 – Juris Alunāns, Latvian philologist and author (died 1864)
- 1833 – Major-General Sir Francis Edward Archibald Chamier, CB, CIE, IMM** British-Indian officer during the British Raj (died 1923)
- 1840 – Alphonse Daudet, French author, poet, and playwright (died 1897)
- 1842 – Arthur Sullivan, English composer (died 1900)
- 1856 – Tom O'Rourke, American boxer and manager (died 1938)
- 1857 – Ronald Ross, Indian-English physician and mathematician, Nobel Prize laureate (died 1932)
- 1868 – Sumner Paine, American target shooter (died 1904)
- 1869 – Mehmet Emin Yurdakul, Turkish writer (died 1944)
- 1877 – Robert Hamilton, Scottish international footballer (died 1948)
- 1881 – Lima Barreto, Brazilian journalist and author (died 1922)
- 1881 – Joe Forshaw, American runner (died 1964)
- 1882 – Georges Braque, French painter and sculptor (died 1963)
- 1883 – Georgios Papanikolaou, Greek-American pathologist, invented the pap smear (died 1962)
- 1884 – Oskar Rosenfeld, Jewish-Austrian writer and Holocaust victim (died 1944)
- 1885 – Mikiel Gonzi, Maltese archbishop (died 1984)
- 1887 – Lorna Hodgkinson, Australian educator and educational psychologist (died 1951)
- 1888 – Inge Lehmann, Danish seismologist and geophysicist (died 1993)
- 1894 – Ásgeir Ásgeirsson, Icelandic politician, 2nd President of Iceland (died 1972)
- 1895 – Nandor Fodor, Hungarian-American psychologist, parapsychologist, and author (died 1964)

=== 1901–present ===
- 1904 – Earle Birney, Canadian poet and novelist (died 1995)
- 1905 – Fakhruddin Ali Ahmed, Indian lawyer and politician, 5th President of India (died 1977)
- 1907 – Daphne du Maurier, English novelist and playwright (died 1989)
- 1909 – Ken Darby, American composer and conductor (died 1992)
- 1911 – Maxine Sullivan, American singer and actress (died 1987)
- 1912 – Gil Evans, Canadian-American pianist, composer, and bandleader (died 1988)
- 1913 – Robert Dorning, English actor, singer, and dancer (died 1989)
- 1913 – William R. Tolbert, Jr., Liberian politician, 20th President of Liberia (died 1980)
- 1914 – Joe Louis, American boxer (died 1981)
- 1914 – Johnnie Wright, American singer-songwriter and guitarist (died 2011)
- 1922 – Otl Aicher, German graphic designer and typographer (died 1991)
- 1922 – Bea Arthur, American actress and singer (died 2009)
- 1924 – Harry Schwarz, South African anti-apartheid leader, lawyer, and Ambassador (died 2010)
- 1927 – Clive Barnes, English writer and critic (died 2008)
- 1928 – Enrique Bolaños, Nicaraguan politician, President of Nicaragua (died 2021)
- 1930 – Mike Gravel, American politician (died 2021)
- 1931 – Jim Jones, American cult leader, founder of the Peoples Temple (died 1978)
- 1933 – John Roseboro, American baseball player and coach (died 2002)
- 1934 – Ehud Netzer, Israeli archaeologist, architect, and academic (died 2010)
- 1935 – James F. White, American funeral director and politician (died 2026)
- 1937 – Zohra Lampert, American actress
- 1937 – Roger Zelazny, American author and poet (died 1995)
- 1938 – Giuliano Amato, Italian academic and politician, 48th Prime Minister of Italy
- 1939 – Harvey Keitel, American actor
- 1940 – Bruce Chatwin, English author (died 1989)
- 1941 – Senta Berger, Austrian actress
- 1941 – Jody Conradt, American basketball player and coach
- 1941 – Ritchie Valens, American singer-songwriter and guitarist (died 1959)
- 1943 – Mary Wells, American singer-songwriter (died 1992)
- 1944 – Armistead Maupin, American author, screenwriter, and actor
- 1945 – Lasse Berghagen, Swedish singer-songwriter, guitarist, and actor (died 2023)
- 1945 – Lou Marini, American saxophonist and composer
- 1946 – Tim Pigott-Smith, English actor and author (died 2017)
- 1946 – Marv Wolfman, American author
- 1949 – Zoë Wanamaker, American-British actress
- 1950 – Danny Kirwan, English singer-songwriter and guitarist (died 2018)
- 1950 – Bobby Valentine, American baseball player and manager
- 1950 – Stevie Wonder, American singer-songwriter, pianist, and producer
- 1952 – John Kasich, American politician, 69th Governor of Ohio
- 1952 – Mary Walsh, Canadian actress, producer, and screenwriter
- 1952 – Londa Schiebinger, American academic and author
- 1954 – Johnny Logan, Australian-Irish singer-songwriter and guitarist
- 1956 – Richard Madeley, English journalist and author
- 1957 – Mar Roxas, Filipino economist and politician, 24th Secretary of the Interior and Local Government
- 1961 – Siobhan Fallon Hogan, American actress
- 1961 – Dennis Rodman, American basketball player, wrestler, and actor
- 1963 – Andrea Leadsom, English politician
- 1964 – Stephen Colbert, American comedian and talk show host
- 1965 – José Rijo, Dominican baseball player
- 1965 – Lari White, American singer-songwriter, producer, and actress (died 2018)
- 1966 – Alison Goldfrapp, English singer-songwriter and producer
- 1966 – Darius Rucker, American singer-songwriter and guitarist
- 1967 – Chuck Schuldiner, American singer-songwriter and guitarist (died 2001)
- 1967 – Melanie Thornton, American-German singer (died 2001)
- 1968 – Scott Morrison, Australian politician, 30th Prime Minister of Australia
- 1969 – Buckethead, American guitarist and songwriter
- 1972 – Darryl Sydor, Canadian ice hockey player and coach
- 1973 – Reinhold Einwallner, Austrian politician
- 1976 – Trajan Langdon, American basketball player and executive
- 1977 – Tom Cotton, American politician
- 1977 – Ilse DeLange, Dutch singer-songwriter
- 1977 – Samantha Morton, English actress and director
- 1977 – Pusha T, American rapper
- 1978 – Mike Bibby, American basketball player and coach
- 1978 – Barry Zito, American baseball player
- 1979 – Prince Carl Philip, Duke of Värmland
- 1979 – Steve Mildenhall, English footballer
- 1981 – Luciana Berger, English politician
- 1981 – Andrey Polukeyev, Russian sprinter
- 1982 – Larry Fonacier, Filipino basketball player
- 1982 – Oguchi Onyewu, American footballer
- 1983 – Natalie Cassidy, English actress and singer
- 1983 – Anita Görbicz, Hungarian handball player
- 1983 – Yaya Touré, Ivorian footballer
- 1984 – Dawn Harper, American hurdler
- 1985 – Javi Balboa, Equatoguinean footballer
- 1985 – Jaroslav Halák, Slovak ice hockey player
- 1985 – Iwan Rheon, Welsh actor and singer
- 1985 – Travis Zajac, Canadian ice hockey player
- 1986 – Lena Dunham, American actress, director, and screenwriter
- 1986 – Robert Pattinson, English actor
- 1986 – Alexander Rybak, Belarusian-Norwegian singer-songwriter, violinist, and actor
- 1986 – Kris Versteeg, Canadian ice hockey player
- 1987 – Candice King, American singer-songwriter and actress
- 1987 – Marianne Vos, Dutch cyclist
- 1988 – Paulo Avelino, Filipino actor and singer
- 1988 – Casey Donovan, Australian singer-songwriter
- 1988 – Lydia Williams, Australian footballer
- 1989 – P. K. Subban, Canadian ice hockey player
- 1990 – Mychal Givens, American baseball player
- 1991 – Jen Beattie, Scottish footballer
- 1991 – Francis Coquelin, French footballer
- 1991 – Junior Messias, Brazilian footballer
- 1991 – Alan Patrick, Brazilian footballer
- 1992 – Thievy Bifouma, Congolese footballer
- 1992 – Willson Contreras, Venezuelan baseball player
- 1992 – Tyrann Mathieu, American football player
- 1992 – Josh Papalii, New Zealand-Australian rugby league player
- 1992 – Mark Stone, Canadian hockey player
- 1993 – Abby Dahlkemper, American footballer
- 1993 – Romelu Lukaku, Belgian footballer
- 1993 – Debby Ryan, American actress and singer
- 1993 – Morgan Wallen, American singer-songwriter
- 1994 – Percy Tau, South African footballer
- 1997 – Nico Hoerner, American baseball player
- 1998 – Adrià Pedrosa, Spanish footballer
- 1998 – Luca Zidane, Algerian footballer
- 1999 – Óscar Mingueza, Spanish footballer
- 1999 – Aníbal Moreno, Argentine footballer
- 2002 – Diego López, Spanish footballer
- 2003 – Jaxson Dart, American football player
- 2003 – Javi Guerra, Spanish footballer
- 2003 – Jabari Smith Jr., American basketball player
- 2005 – Romain Esse, English footballer

== Deaths ==
=== Pre-1600 ===
- 189 – Emperor Ling of Han, Chinese emperor (born 156)
- 1112 – Ulric II, Margrave of Carniola
- 1176 – Matthias I, Duke of Lorraine (born 1119)
- 1285 – Robert de Ros, 1st Baron de Ros
- 1312 – Theobald II, Duke of Lorraine (born 1263)
- 1573 – Takeda Shingen, Japanese daimyō (born 1521)

=== 1601–1900 ===
- 1612 – Sasaki Kojirō, Japanese master swordsman (born 1575)
- 1619 – Johan van Oldenbarnevelt, Dutch politician (born 1547)
- 1704 – Louis Bourdaloue, French preacher and author (born 1632)
- 1726 – Francesco Antonio Pistocchi, Italian singer (born 1659)
- 1782 – Daniel Solander, Swedish-English botanist and phycologist (born 1736)
- 1807 – Eliphalet Dyer, American colonel, lawyer, and politician (born 1721)
- 1809 – Beilby Porteus, English bishop (born 1731)
- 1832 – Georges Cuvier, French zoologist and academic (born 1769)
- 1835 – John Nash, English architect, designed the Royal Pavilion (born 1752)
- 1836 – John Littlejohn, American sheriff and Methodist preacher (born 1756)
- 1866 – Nikolai Brashman, Czech-Russian mathematician and academic (born 1796)
- 1878 – Joseph Henry, American physicist and academic (born 1797)
- 1884 – Cyrus McCormick, American businessman, co-founded the International Harvester Company (born 1809)
- 1885 – Friedrich Gustav Jakob Henle, German physician, pathologist, and anatomist (born 1809)

=== 1901–present ===
- 1903 – Apolinario Mabini, Filipino lawyer and politician, 1st Prime Minister of the Philippines (born 1864)
- 1916 – Sholem Aleichem, Ukrainian-American author and playwright (born 1859)
- 1921 – Jean Aicard, French author, poet, and playwright (born 1848)
- 1926 – Libert H. Boeynaems, Belgian-American bishop (born 1857)
- 1929 – Arthur Scherbius, German electrical engineer, invented the Enigma machine (born 1878)
- 1930 – Fridtjof Nansen, Norwegian scientist, explorer, and academic, Nobel Prize laureate (born 1861)
- 1938 – Charles Édouard Guillaume, Swiss-French physicist and academic, Nobel Prize laureate (born 1861)
- 1941 – Frederick Christian, English cricketer (born 1877)
- 1941 – Ōnishiki Uichirō, Japanese sumo wrestler, the 26th Yokozuna (born 1891)
- 1945 – Tubby Hall, American drummer (born 1895)
- 1946 – Zara DuPont, American suffragist (born 1869)
- 1947 – Sukanta Bhattacharya, Indian poet and playwright (born 1926)
- 1948 – Kathleen Cavendish, Marchioness of Hartington (born 1920)
- 1957 – Michael Fekete, Hungarian-Israeli mathematician and academic (born 1886)
- 1961 – Gary Cooper, American actor (born 1901)
- 1962 – Henry Trendley Dean, American dentist (born 1893)
- 1962 – Franz Kline, American painter and academic (born 1910)
- 1963 – Alois Hudal, Austrian-Italian bishop (born 1885)
- 1972 – Dan Blocker, American actor (born 1928)
- 1974 – Jaime Torres Bodet, Mexican poet and diplomat (born 1902)
- 1974 – Arthur J. Burks, American colonel and author (born 1898)
- 1975 – Marguerite Perey, French physicist (born 1909)
- 1975 – Bob Wills, American singer-songwriter and actor (born 1905)
- 1977 – Mickey Spillane, American mobster (born 1934)
- 1985 – Leatrice Joy, American actress (born 1893)
- 1985 – Richard Ellmann, American literary critic and biographer (born 1918)
- 1988 – Chet Baker, American singer and trumpet player (born 1929)
- 1992 – F. E. McWilliam, Irish sculptor (born 1909)
- 1994 – Duncan Hamilton, Irish-English race car driver (born 1920)
- 1994 – John Swainson, Canadian-American jurist and politician, 42nd Governor of Michigan (born 1925)
- 1995 – Hao Wang, Chinese-American logician, philosopher, and mathematician (born 1921)
- 1999 – Abd al-Aziz ibn Baz, Saudi Arabian scholar and academic (born 1910)
- 1999 – Gene Sarazen, American golfer and journalist (born 1902)
- 2000 – Paul Bartel, American actor, director, and screenwriter (born 1938)
- 2000 – Jumbo Tsuruta, Japanese wrestler (born 1951)
- 2001 – Jason Miller, American actor and playwright (born 1939)
- 2002 – Valeriy Lobanovskyi, Ukrainian footballer and manager (born 1939)
- 2005 – Eddie Barclay, French record producer, founded Barclay Records (born 1921)
- 2005 – George Dantzig, American mathematician and academic (born 1914)
- 2006 – Jaroslav Pelikan, American historian and scholar (born 1923)
- 2006 – Johnnie Wilder, Jr., American singer (born 1949)
- 2008 – Saad Al-Salim Al-Sabah, Kuwaiti ruler, Emir of Kuwait (born 1930)
- 2008 – Ron Stone, American journalist and author (born 1936)
- 2009 – Frank Aletter, American actor (born 1926)
- 2009 – Meir Brandsdorfer, Belgian rabbi (born 1934)
- 2009 – Achille Compagnoni, Italian skier and mountaineer (born 1914)
- 2011 – Derek Boogaard, Canadian ice hockey player (born 1982)
- 2011 – Stephen De Staebler, American sculptor and educator (born 1933)
- 2011 – Wallace McCain, Canadian businessman, co-founded McCain Foods (born 1930)
- 2011 – Bruce Ricker, American director and producer (born 1942)
- 2012 – Arsala Rahmani Daulat, Afghan politician (born 1937)
- 2012 – Donald "Duck" Dunn, American bass player, songwriter, and producer (born 1941)
- 2012 – Ada Maria Isasi-Diaz, Cuban-American theologian, author, and academic (born 1943)
- 2012 – Lee Richardson, English speedway rider (born 1979)
- 2012 – Don Ritchie, Australian humanitarian (born 1925)
- 2012 – Nguyễn Văn Thiện, Vietnamese bishop (born 1906)
- 2013 – Joyce Brothers, American psychologist, author, and actress (born 1927)
- 2013 – Otto Herrigel, Namibian lawyer and politician (born 1937)
- 2013 – Jagdish Mali, Indian photographer (born 1954)
- 2013 – Chuck Muncie, American football player (born 1953)
- 2013 – Fyodor Tuvin, Russian footballer (born 1973)
- 2013 – Lynne Woolstencroft, Canadian politician (born 1943)
- 2014 – David Malet Armstrong, Australian philosopher and author (born 1926)
- 2014 – Malik Bendjelloul, Swedish director and producer (born 1977)
- 2014 – J. F. Coleman, American soldier and pilot (born 1918)
- 2014 – Ron Stevens, Canadian lawyer and politician (born 1949)
- 2014 – Morning Glory Zell-Ravenheart, American occultist and author (born 1948)
- 2015 – Earl Averill, Jr., American baseball player (born 1931)
- 2015 – Robert Drasnin, American clarinet player and composer (born 1927)
- 2015 – Nina Otkalenko, Russian runner (born 1928)
- 2015 – David Sackett, American-Canadian physician and academic (born 1934)
- 2015 – Gainan Saidkhuzhin, Russian cyclist (born 1937)
- 2016 – Murray A. Straus, American sociologist and academic (born 1926)
- 2019 – Doris Day, American singer and actress (born 1922)
- 2019 – Unita Blackwell, American civil rights activist and politician (born 1933)
- 2022 – Khalifa bin Zayed Al Nahyan, 2nd President of the United Arab Emirates (born 1948)
- 2024 – Alice Munro, Canadian short story writer (born 1931)
- 2024 – Cyril Wecht, American forensic pathologist (born 1931)
- 2024 – Samm-Art Williams, American playwright and screenwriter (born 1946)
- 2025 – Kit Bond, American lawyer and politician, 47th Governor of Missouri (born 1939)
- 2025 – Danny Lendich, New Zealand businessperson (born 1944)
- 2025 – José Mujica, Uruguayan politician, 40th President of Uruguay (born 1935)

== Holidays and observances ==
- Abbotsbury Garland Day (Dorset, England)
- Christian feast day:
  - André-Hubert Fournet
  - Our Lady of Fátima
  - Conchita Barrecheguren (Roman Catholic)
  - Gerard of Villamagna
  - Glyceria
  - John the Silent (Roman Catholic)
  - Julian of Norwich (Roman Catholic)
  - Frances Perkins (Episcopal Church (USA))
  - Servatius
  - May 13 (Eastern Orthodox liturgics)
- Rotuma Day (Rotuma)
