= Enrico Butti =

Italian sculptor (1847–1932)

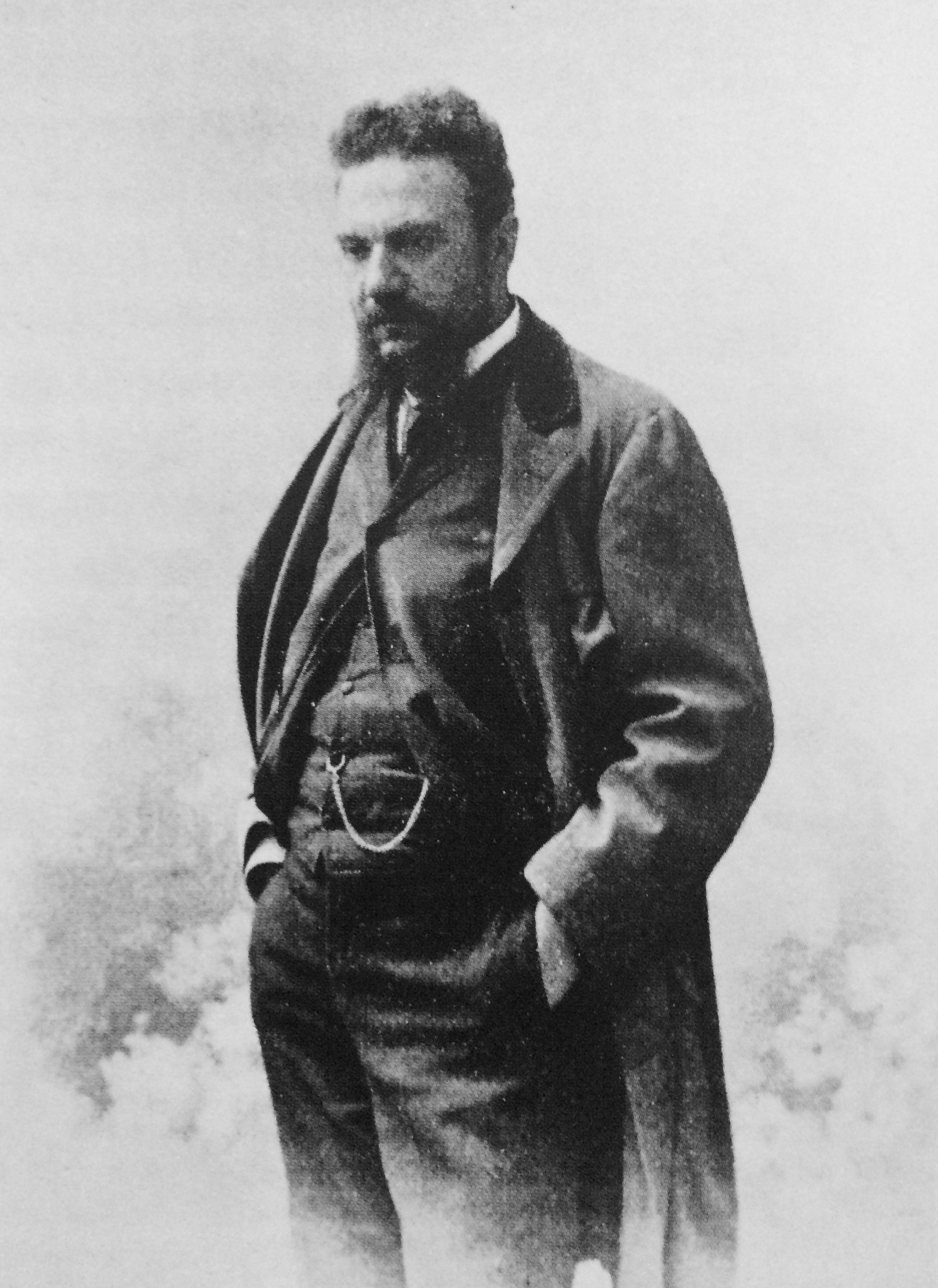
- Born: 3 April 1847; Viggiù, Varese, Lombardo-Venetian Kingdom, Austrian Empire
- Died: 21 January 1932 (aged 84); Viggiù, Italy

Enrico Butti (April 3, 1847 – January 21, 1932) was an Italian sculptor, active mainly in Milan. He created principally funerary and commemorative monuments. He was professor of sculpture at the Accademia di Brera from 1893 to 1913.

== Biography ==
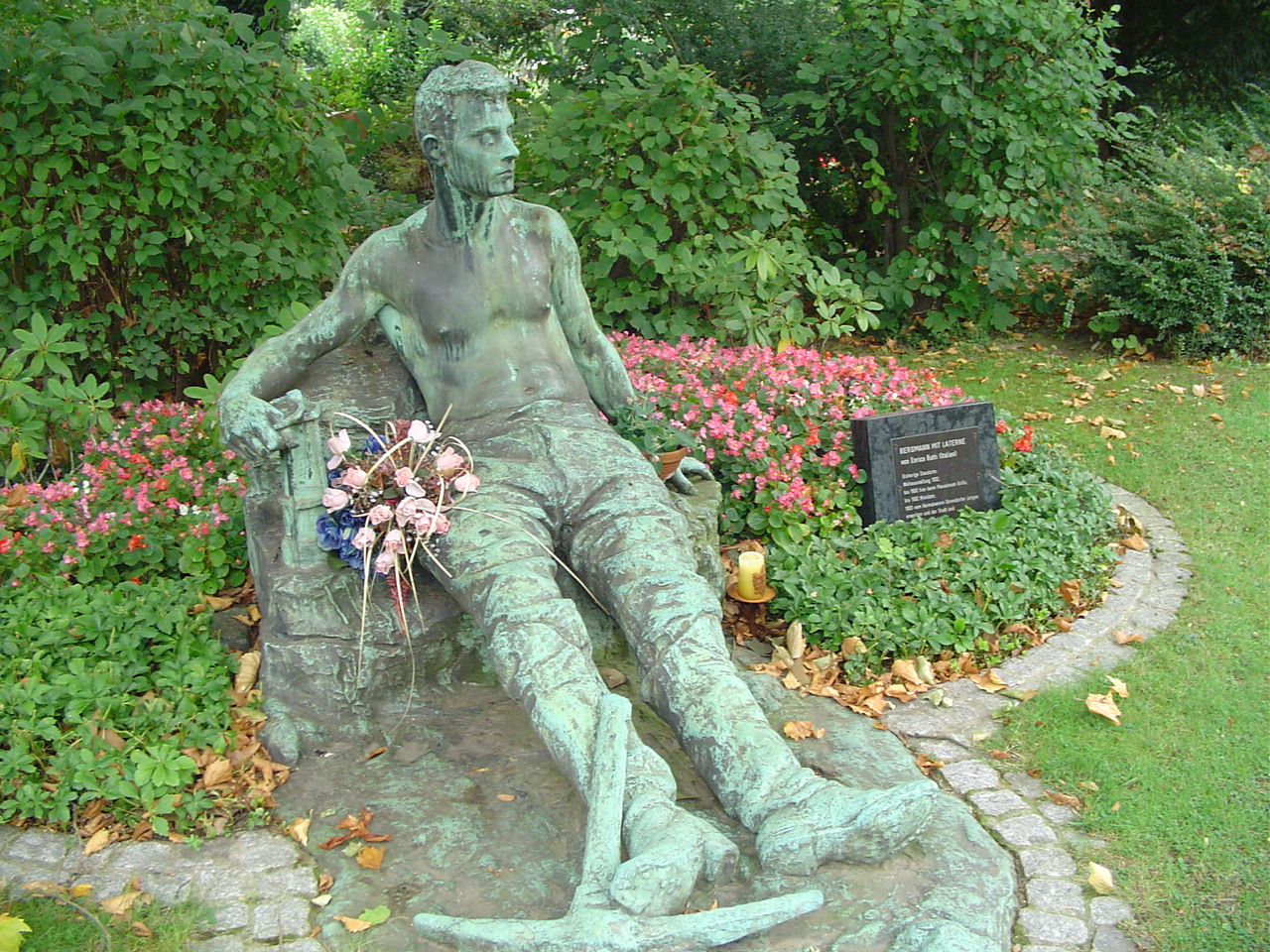
Enrico Butti, Minatore con lanterna (Feld 85, Nordfriedhof Düsseldorf)

He was born to a family of marble cutters and sculptors. At the age of 14, he began studying at the Brera under the sculptor Pietro Magni, making ends meet by working for other sculptors such as Francesco Barzaghi, Ugo Zannoni, and Magni. In the 1872 National Exhibition in Milan, he exhibited his first work, a marble Raphael, but two years later his Eleonora d'Este drew much praise. In 1879, he exhibited at the Brera a monument for the Cavi-Bossi family, for which he gained the Prince Umberto prize. In subsequent exhibition, he completed the work Time for the monument of the Borghi family, the monument for the Guerrini family, and the monument for the Galbiati family, depicting the symbols of brotherhood. These monuments are now in the Monumental Cemetery of Milan. His Il Minatore ("the miner") was exhibited at the Brera;it is now in Nordfriedhof Düsseldorf.

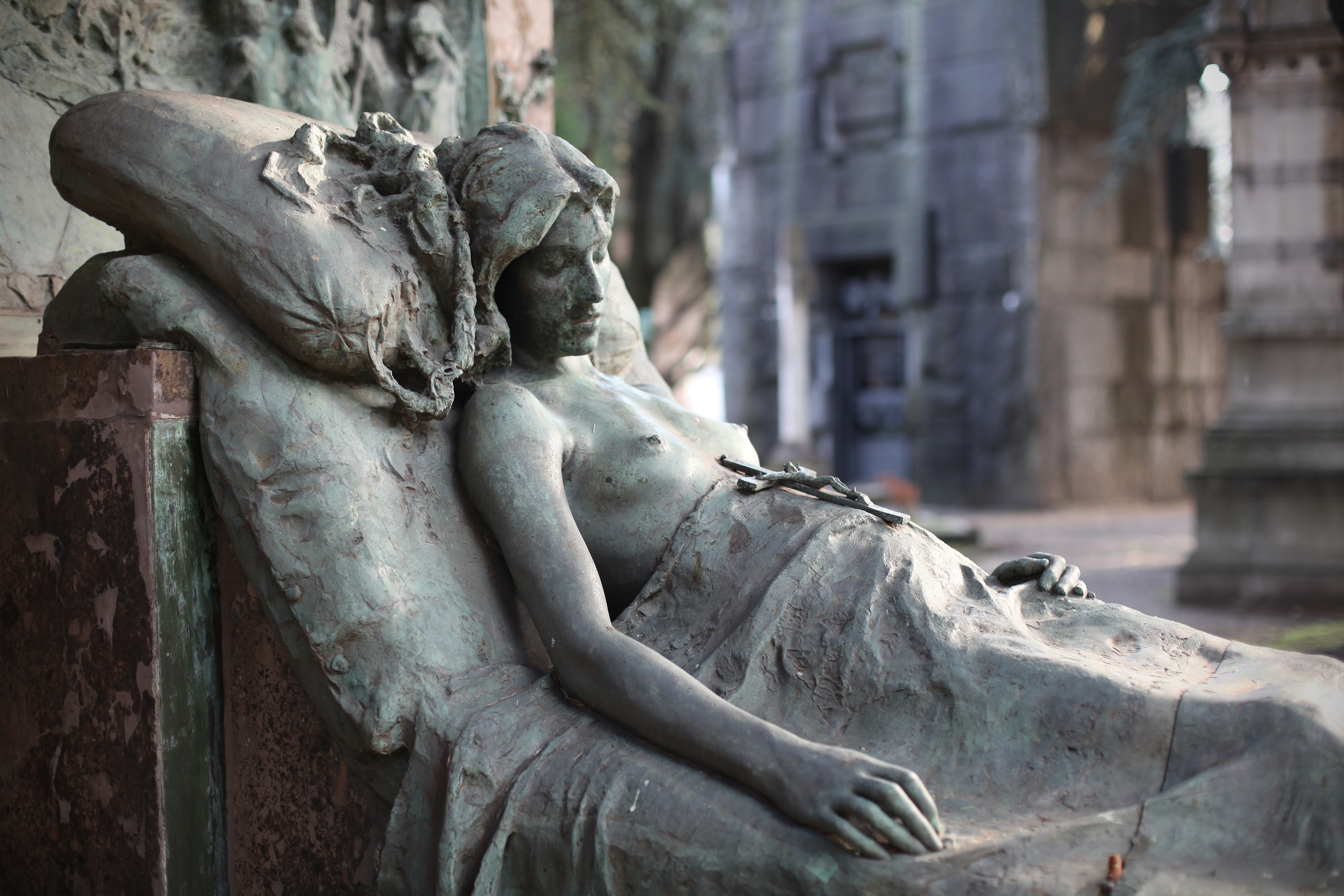
Cemetery monument to Isabella Airoldi in Casati, Milan

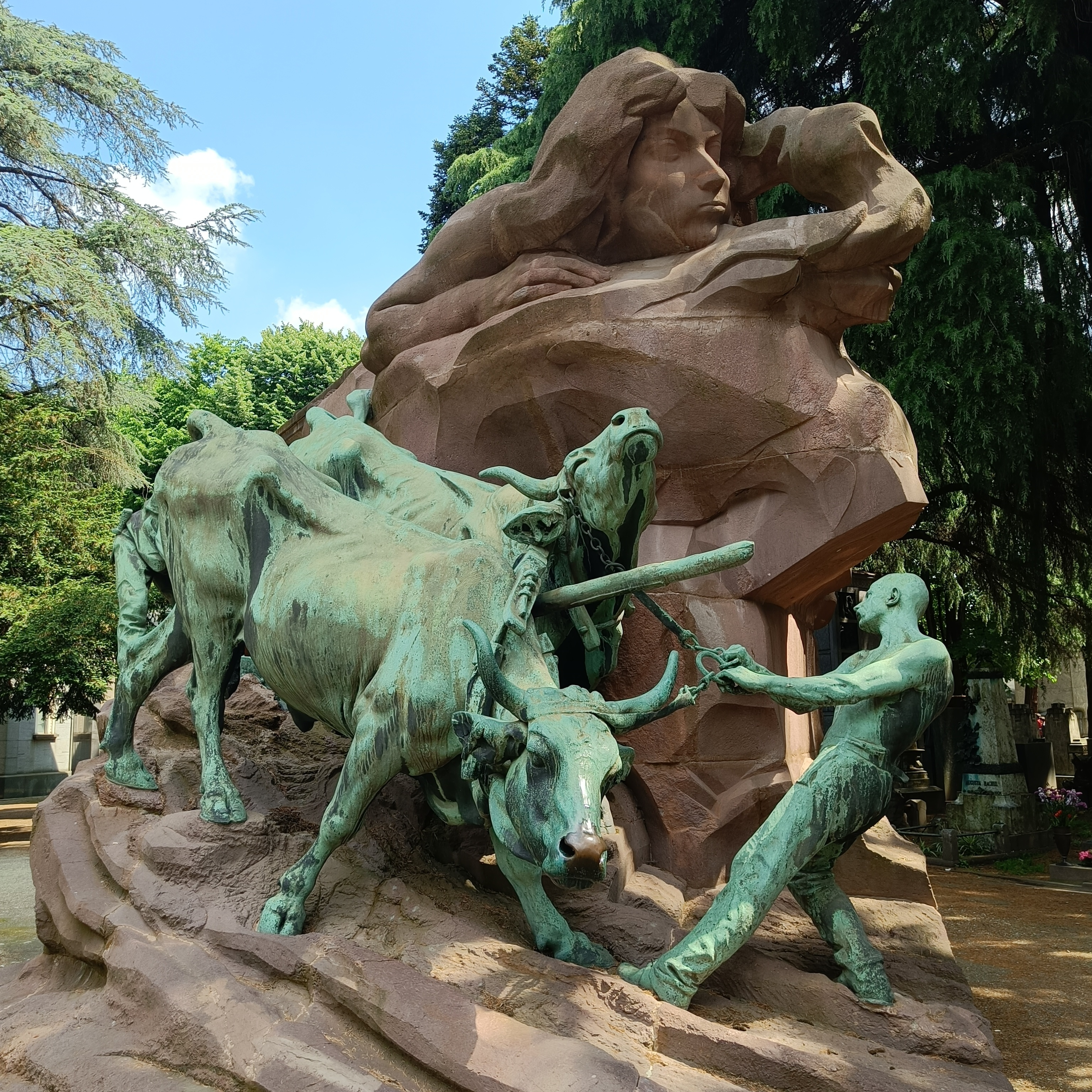
Cemetery monument to Besenzanica family with L'Aratura (Plowing figures), Milan

Other sculptures include Tasso in Jail (now in St Petersburg); Cain; Le smorfie; Stizze; St Jerome (1875); Il mio garzone; Santa Rosa da Lima for the Duomo of Milan (1876); I minatori del Sempione (1906); and the sculptural group of La tregua (1906). Also for the cemetery of Milan, he sculpted a Mater consolatrix and the complex monument to the Besenzanica family (1912). He made a monument for the fallen set up in Viggiù in 1919, another for Gallarate (set up in 1924) in Piazza Risorgimento, and finally one in Varese (1925).

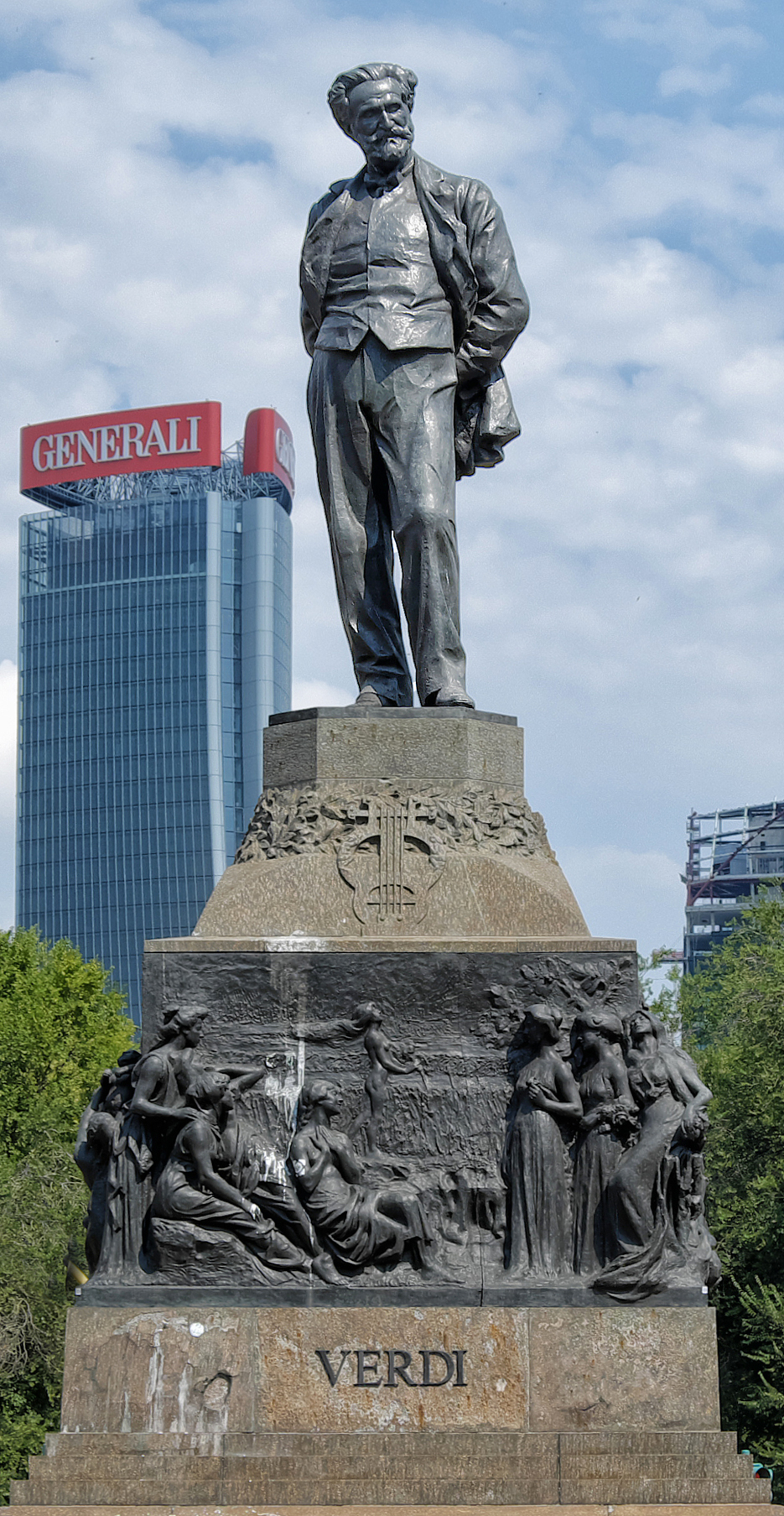
Monument to Verdi (1913, Piazza Buonarroti, Milan)

Also he was the author of the memorial to the founder of the Saint-Petersburg circus – Gaetano Ciniselli (1815–1881), who died in Russia.

Among his public monuments are statues of Generale Sirtori in the public gardens of Milan. And the statue of the Unity of Italy for the Vittoriano in Rome. He sculpted La morente in 1891 for a funeral chapel of the Casati family.

In 1913, due to worsening pulmonary problems he moved back to Viggiù, where he continued to work till his death. He was also a painter.

== Vandalism ==
In 2023 Butti’s fountain statue Domina located in Villa Alceo in Viggiù, Lombardy, was irreversibily destroyed, when German influencer and model Janis Danner, accompanied by his friends, dragged it down to make a video filmed by his girlfriend Jessica De Oliveira, despite the signs clearly stating to not get near nor touch the statue. The estimated value was €200.000, and Danner offered to pay only €200 without any apology and calling the statue "just a statue of sand", then they left the country as quickly as possible. Italian authorities called for severe punishment and legal repercussions against the vandals, with also the involvement of the Interpol.

"Witnessing that scene reminded me of the historical episodes of looting of ancient cities, when the barbarians devastated everything and overturned the statues of the divinities on the ground as a sign of contempt", said Bruno Golferini, the manager of the villa disconsolately, "this act of vandalism made me left the same feeling, also because I grew up in Villa Alceo and that statue has always had a great emotional value for me: it was the symbol of the house, its protector in a certain sense." Then he added: "I had to stop that group first which immediately gave me a bad feeling: they hung from the ledges to take pictures, they drank from bottles of limoncello, then came the destruction of the statue! To make things worse, after having caused damage of hundreds of thousands of euros, they didn’t even feel the need to apologize, on the contrary, they told me that that statue was just made of sand and that they would leave me 200 euros title to compensate!" He then concluded, bitterly: "17 of them were here and I know that they had lunch at Villa d’Este spending about 400 euros each, but they didn’t want to make a collection for Butti’s work. So Golferini filed a complaint with the carabinieri and "also consulted Interpol, because this story won’t end here!"
