= Giovanni Francesco Lucchini =

Italian architect

Giovanni Francesco Lucchini (1 January 1755 – 1826) was an Italian architect.

He was born and died in Bergamo, the son of architect Luca Lucchini, he is best known for designing the Teatro Donizetti in Bergamo.
