= Il Pigmalione =

1816 opera by Gaetano Donizetti

- Opera by Gaetano Donizetti
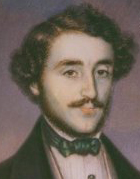
- Donizetti, who composed the opera in 1816, aged 19, as a young man
- Librettist: unknown
- Language: Italian
- Based on: Pygmalion by Jean-Jacques Rousseau
- Premiere: 13 October 1960; Teatro Donizetti, Bergamo

Il Pigmalione (Pygmalion) is a scena lirica (lyric scene or opera) in one act by Gaetano Donizetti. The librettist is unknown, but it is known that the libretto was based on one by Antonio Simeone Sografi for Giovanni Battista Cimador's Pimmalione (1790), in turn based on Jean-Jacques Rousseau's Pygmalion and ultimately based on Book X of Ovid's Metamorphoses. Sografi's libretto was also used for an opera by Bonifazio Asioli (1796).

This was Donizetti's first opera, written in six days between 25 September and 1 October 1816 when the composer was 19 and a student at the Bologna Academy, a position acquired for him with the help of his teacher in Bergamo, Simon Mayr and where his "gift for spontaneous composition flowered". It has been noted that although the comedy is "musically slender, the score, nevertheless, reveals the fledgling composer's flair for melody".

It was not performed until 13 October 1960.

== Performance history ==
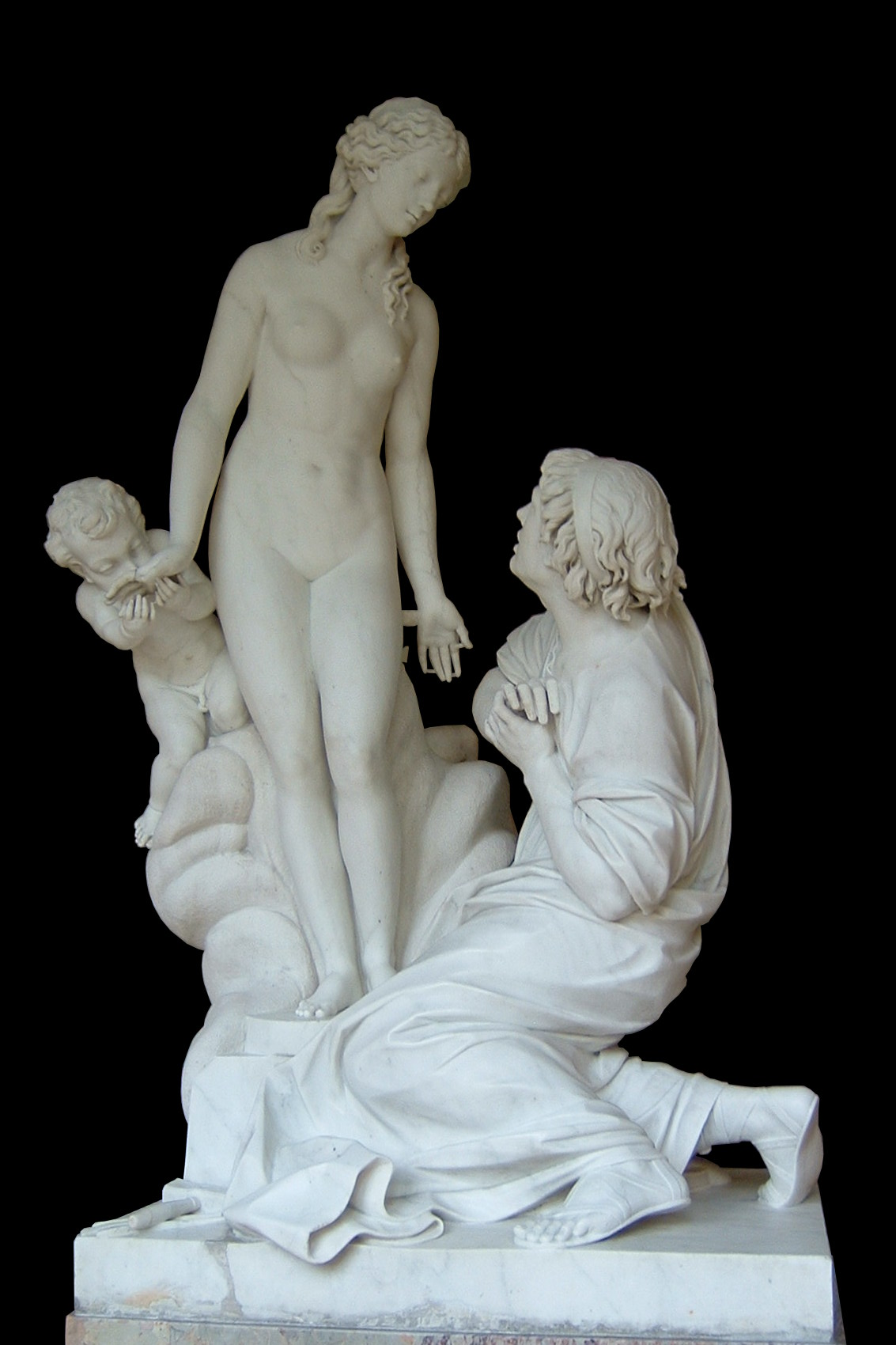
Étienne Maurice Falconet: Pygmalion and Galatée (1763)

The premiere took place at the XVII Festival delle novità at the Teatro Donizetti in the composer's home town of Bergamo, Italy, on 13 October 1960. The performance was conducted by Armando Gatto, while the role of Pigmalione was performed by Doro Antonioli and that of Galatea by soprano Oriana Santunione.

Other performances appear to have been sporadic: in 1974 under Bruno Rigacci, it was given by the Orchestra della Radiotelivisione della Svizzera Italiana in Lugano, and a recording made of a performance in 1990 at the Teatro Comunale Giuseppe Verdi in Terni in Umbria. New York City Opera presented the New York City premiere in March 2018.Chicago Opera Theater presented the Chicago premiere in April 2018, in a double bill with Donizetti's Rita.

== Roles ==
Roles, voice types, premier cast
Role	Voice type	Premiere cast, 13 October 1960 Conductor: Armando Gatto
Pigmalione, Pygmalion, the King of Crete	tenor	Doro Antonioli
Galatea, Galathea	soprano	Oriana Santunione

== Synopsis ==
Time: The classical past
Place: Cyprus

The story of the opera is based on the famous story of a king and sculptor, Pygmalion, originally taken from the tenth book of the Metamorphoses by Ovid. Pigmalione, dismayed that he may never find in real life the ideal of feminine beauty, creates a sculpture of it himself. Having fallen in love with his own creation, Pigmalione's prayer for the sculpture's (christened Galatea) animation is answered by Venus.

== Recordings ==
Year	Cast (Pigmalione, Galatea)	Conductor, opera house and orchestra	Label
1990	Paolo Pellegrini; Susanna Rigacci	Fabio Maestri, Canto Association Chamber Orchestra (CDs include recordings of Donizetti's Rita, Olimpiade (1817), and La bella prigioniera). (Live recording, September 1990)	Audio CD: Bongiovanni; Cat: GB 2109/10-2
