= Francesco Jerace =

Italian sculptor (1853–1937)

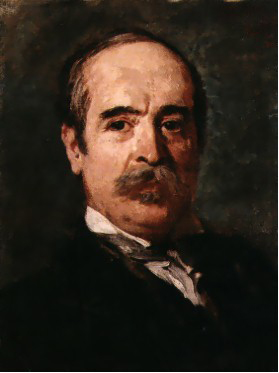
- Portrait of Francesco Jerace
- Born: 26 July 1853
- Died: 18 January 1937 (aged 83)
- Known for: Sculpting

Francesco Jerace (26 July 1853 – 18 January 1937) was an Italian sculptor.

== Biography ==
He was born at Polistena in Calabria, in the Kingdom of the Two Sicilies. He trained locally under his grandfather, a sculptor, but moved to Naples where he frequented the Neapolitan Academy of Fine Arts under Tito Angelini.

In 1878, he displayed sculptures of Eve and Lucifer and Guappatiello (Neapolitan Street Boy) in 1878 at the Neapolitan Exhibition. In 1880, he displayed sculptures of Victa (bust, allegory of a conquered, yet not defeated Poland under the partitions of Russia, Prussia and Austria), Marion, and the Legionnaires of Germanicus at the National Exhibition in Turin.

The Legionnaire sculpture was interpreted by the critic Salazar as a response to the Hermannsdenkmal, then a recently erected monument in Germany to Arminius, the Germanic general that vanquished the Roman Varro in the Battle of the Teutoburg Forest. Germanicus was viewed by later historians as Augustus' response to the defeat as well as the loss of the legionary eagles, and called the Avenger of Varro. One soldier blows a horn, the other raises a flag, and the third inscribes on stone the defeated Germania; about them is the booty of war. The statue won first prize at Turin.

In 1894, he displayed a sculpture of Vittoria Colonna at the Exhibition of the Brera Academy. In 1895, he displayed a controversial sculpture of Beethoven at the Venice International Exhibition. The sculpture, now in a cloister of the Music Conservatory San Pietro a Majella, depicts the composer reclining upon a large, rough rock. Restless, turning to the side, he peers to the distance with a composition on paper strewn on the rock.

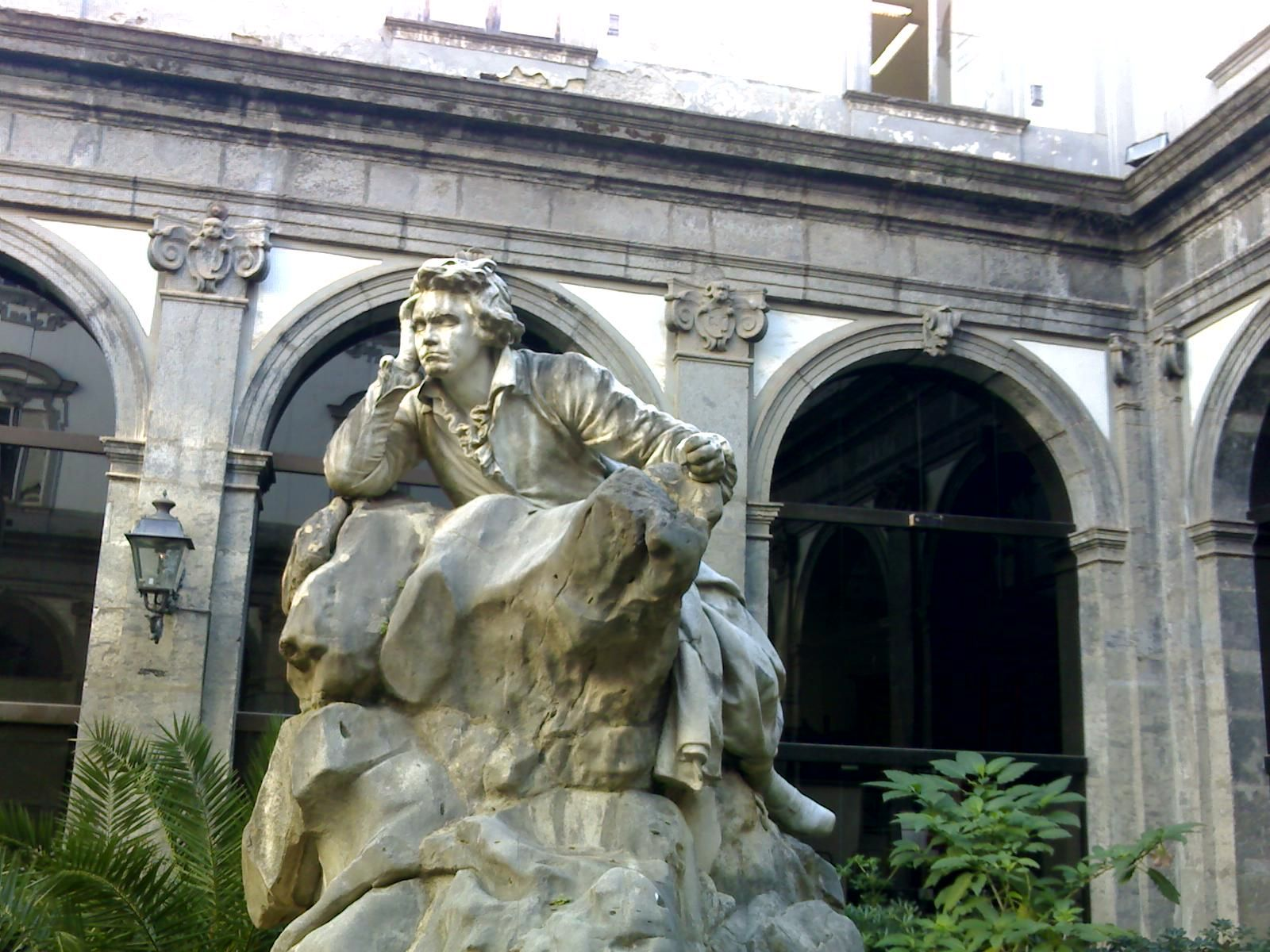
Monument to Beethoven, San Pietro a Majella, Naples

In 1899 he married the Princess Vittoria Eisner Von Eisenhof, who became his inspirational muse for various subsequent works. From her it acquired, according to the custom of the time (already ratified with the Royal Dispatches of 4 and 24 April 1828, and later confirmed by the provisions of the "Royal Decree of 16 June 1927, n. 1091, which contains supplementary and declarative rules to the Royal Decree of 16 August 1926, n. 1489 "), the title of Prince Margravius, held until his death (as set out in Art. 3 of the aforementioned Decree), and that of Nobleman of Eisenhof. From the branch of the Morani family he also received the title of Noble of the Barons of Gagliato.

Jerace's Monument to Donizetti, inaugurated in 1897, is sited in a public garden, adjacent to the Teatro Donizetti in Bergamo. In the monument, the composer is seated on an otherwise empty bench, composing with his eyes close, while he listens to a lyric muse who stands or floats nearby.

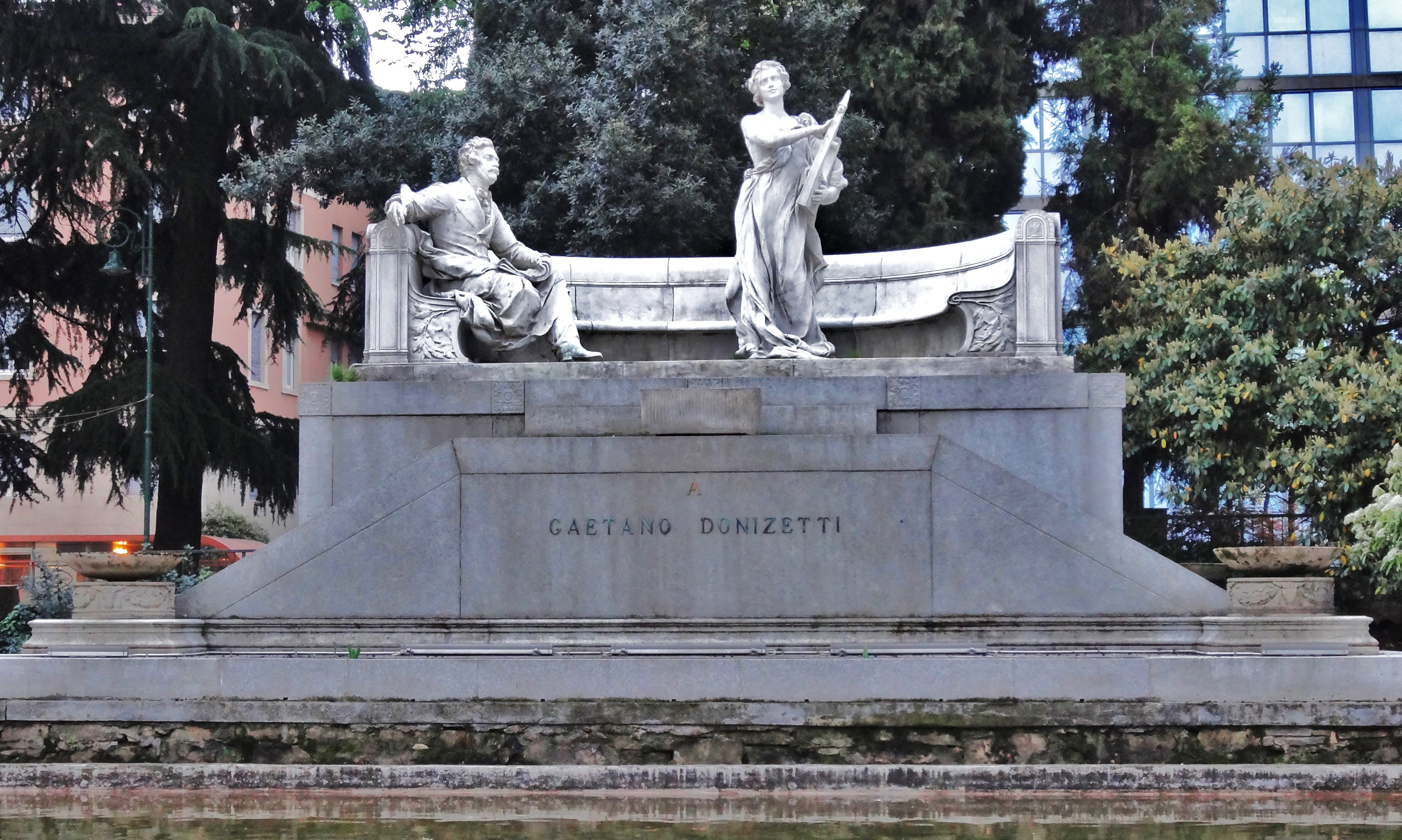
Monument to Donizetti, Bergamo

Jerace contributed a grouping to the Victor Emmanuel II Monument, celebrating Italy's unification. He also sculpted a statue of Vittorio Emmanuele II (1888) for facade of the Royal Palace of Naples, and sculpted a monument to the English astronomer and mathematician, Mary Somerville, in the Protestant cemetery at Naples. He also completed a series of bas-reliefs for churches and monuments. He created a monuments to the fallen (Monumento ai Caduti) for the town of Polistena and the city of Reggio Calabria. One of his reliefs was in a Church in Warsaw, Poland.

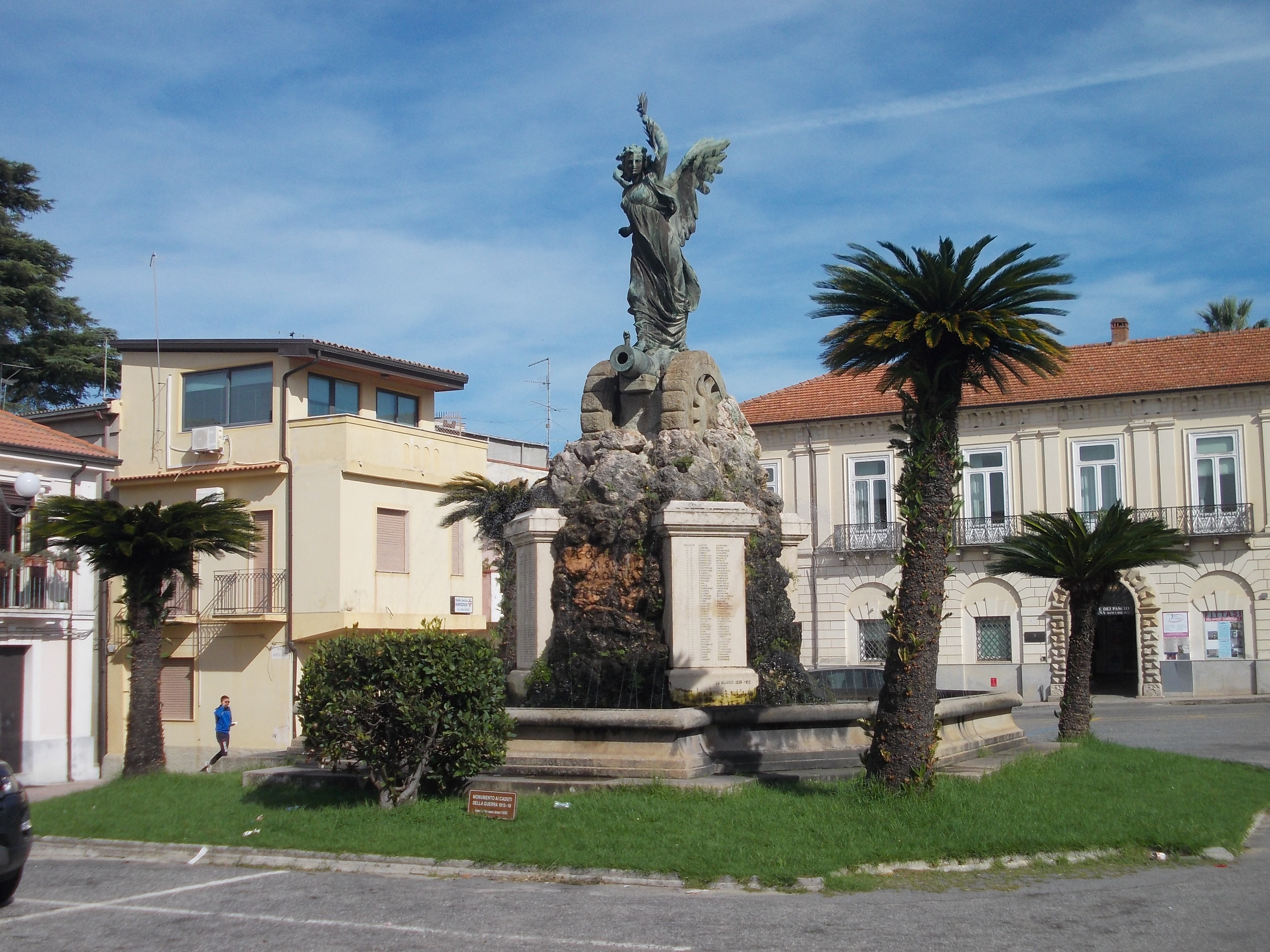
Monumento ai Caduti, Polistena

He became professor in the Naples Institute of Fine Arts. Jerace died in Naples. His brother Vincenzo, born 1862, was also a sculptor, albeit of small works.
