= Teatro Donizetti =

Theatre and opera house in Bergamo, Italy

Coordinates: 45.6951°N 9.6711°E

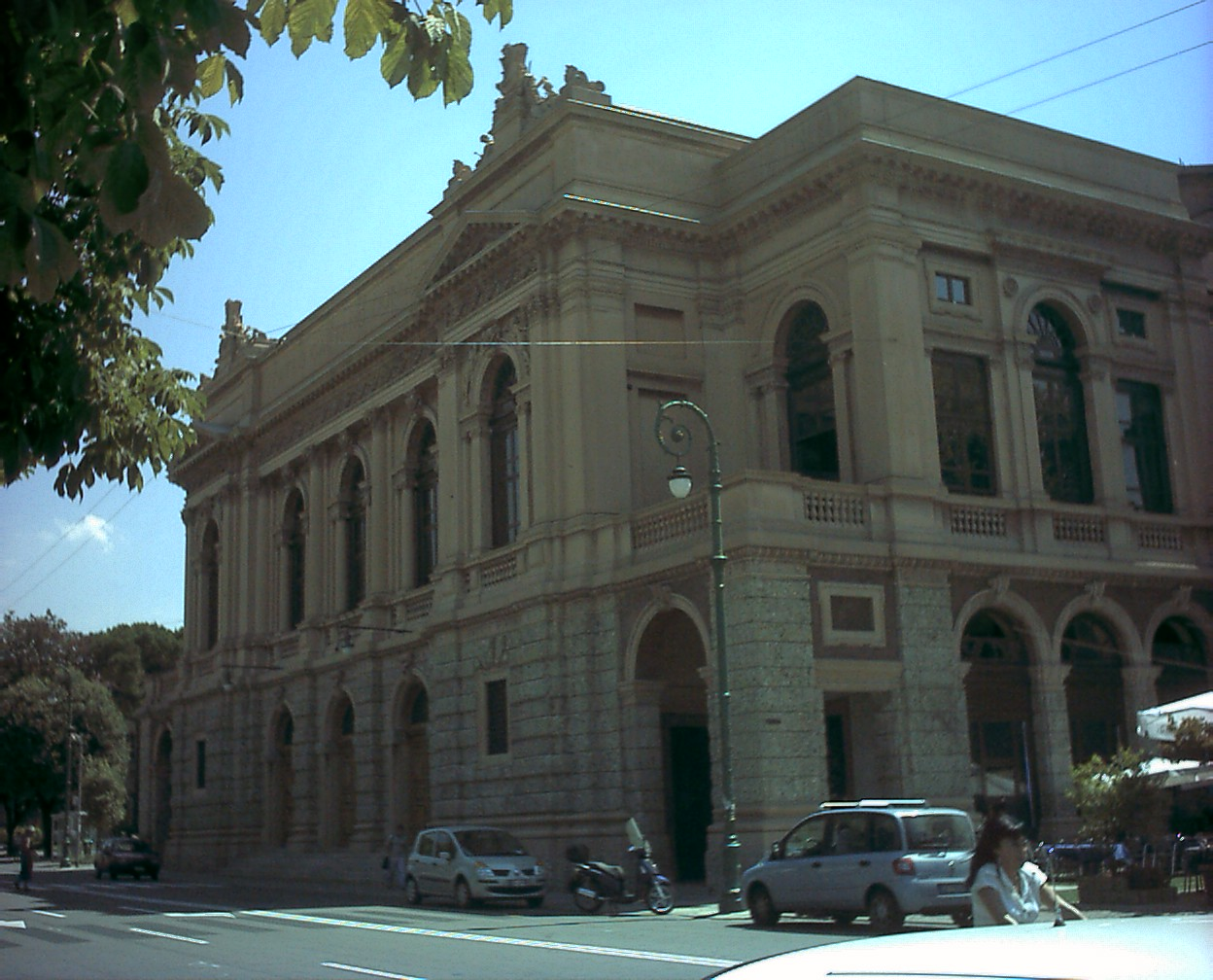
Teatro Donizetti

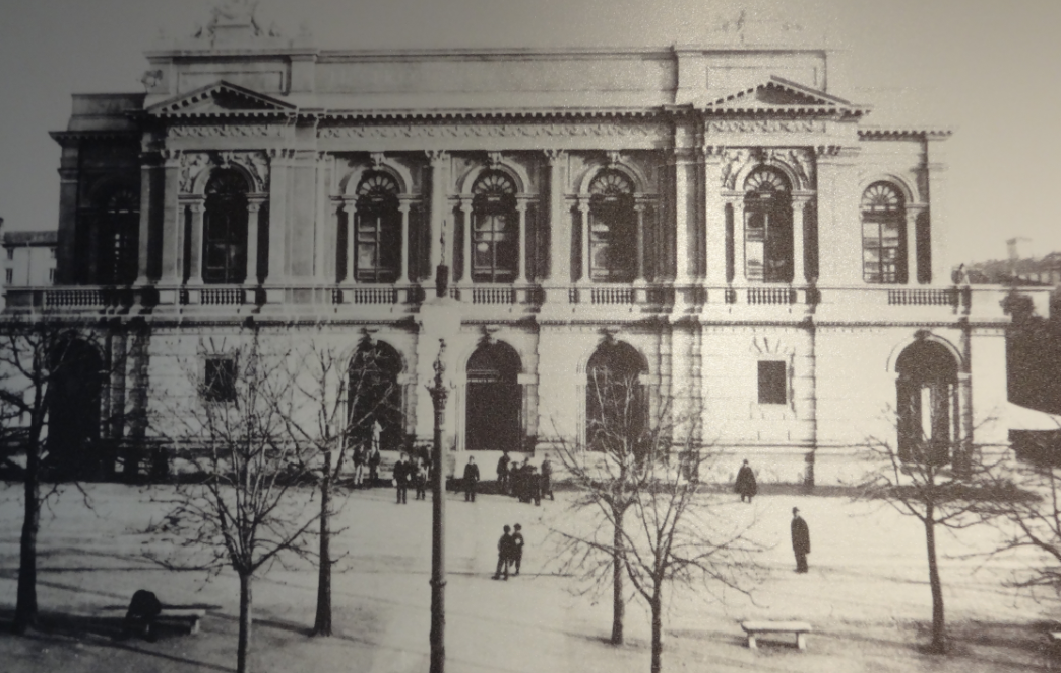
Teatro Donizetti, Bergamo, 1897

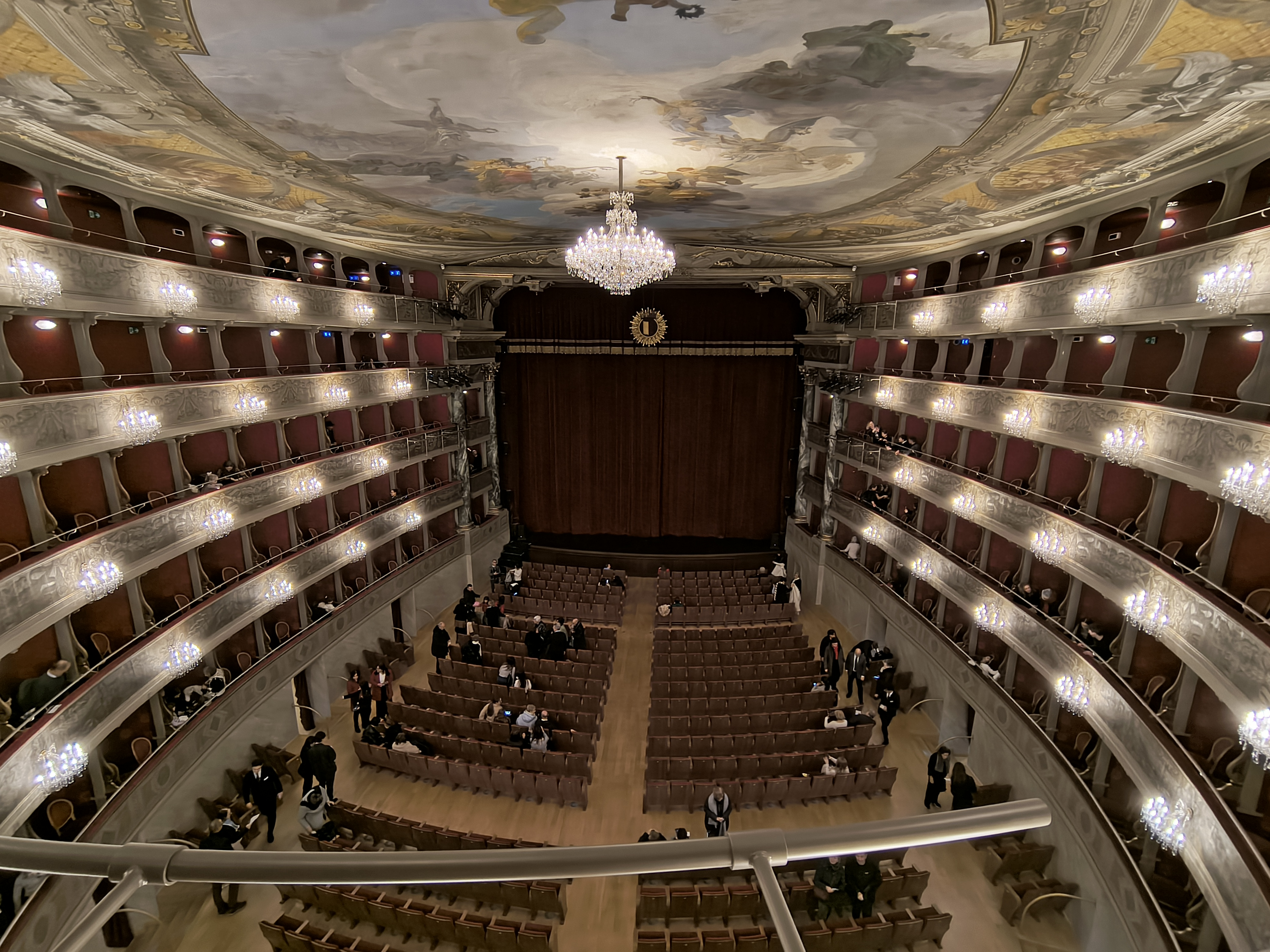
The main hall

The Teatro Donizetti is an opera house in Bergamo, Italy. Built in the 1780s using a design by architect Giovanni Francesco Lucchini, the theatre was originally referred to as either the Teatro Nuovo or Teatro di Fiera. The first opera to be mounted at the theatre, Giuseppe Sarti's Medonte, re di Epiro, was in 1784 while the opera house was still under construction. The official opening of the house, under the name the Teatro Riccardi, did not occur until 24 August 1791 with a production of Pietro Metastasio's Didone abbandonata set to music by multiple composers, including Ferdinando Bertoni, Giacomo Rampini, Johann Gottlieb Naumann, Giuseppe Gazzaniga, and Giovanni Paisiello.

In 1797 the original theatre was destroyed by a fire, possibly by arson. Lucchini was contracted again to design a new structure to replace the old one and the new house opened on 30 June 1800. The structure uses a horseshoe shape with three tiers of boxes and two galleries.

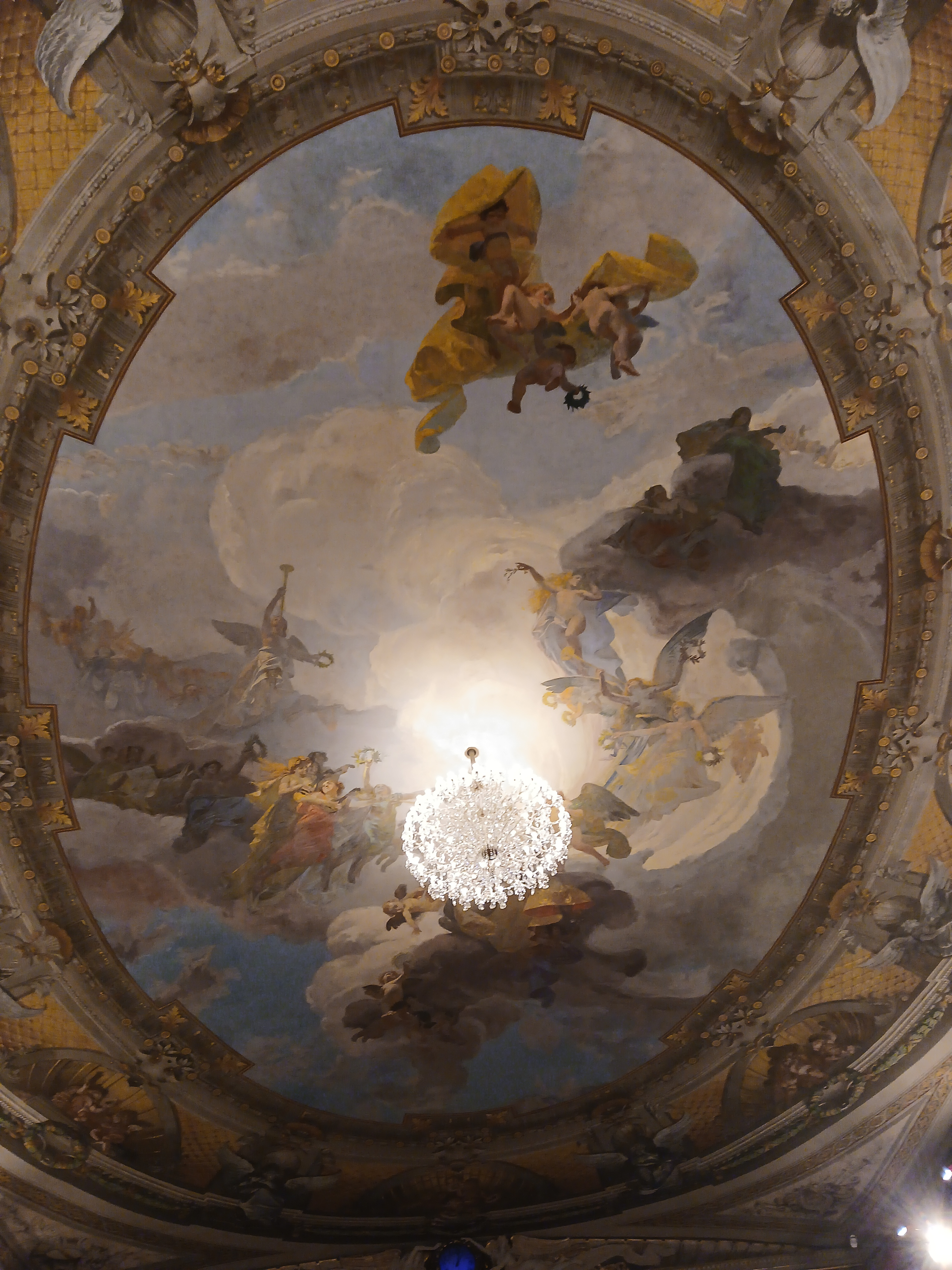
The fresco The Musical Art by Francesco Domenighini on the ceiling of the auditorium.

In 1840, Bergamo paid public tribute for the first time to its native son, Gaetano Donizetti, who was present at the theater for a performance of his opera L'esule di Roma. Giuseppe Verdi, who was in the audience, made his debut at the Riccardi with Ernani in 1844.

In 1897, to mark the centenary of the composer's birth, the Teatro Riccardi was renamed the Teatro Gaetano Donizetti. On this occasion, work began on the new Neoclassical façade, designed by the Roman architect Pietro Via. The interiors were renovated in 1964, and, to celebrate the reopening of the renovated theater, a commemorative medal was struck under the auspices of the Circolo Numismatico Bergamasco and designed by Piero Brolis, who also created the two large bronze Ballerine (Dancers). Donated to the city in 1983, the sculptures were initially placed on either side of the entrance to the auditorium and are now located in the main foyer.

In 1897 the name of the theatre was changed to the Teatro Gaetano Donizetti (now shortened to Teatro Donizetti) on the occasion of the centenary of the composer's birth. Donizetti was born in Bergamo's Borgo Canale quarter and his first opera, Il Pigmalione (composed 1816), was given its world premiere at the theatre on 13 October 1960.

As part of the 2019 Donizetti Opera Festival, the Teatro Donizetti, then undergoing renovation, hosted the first Italian staged performance of L'ange de Nisida, an opera by the Bergamo-born composer that had been considered lost.

Adjacent to the theater is a park with the Monument to Donizetti.
