= Pygmalion and Galatea =

Pygmalion and Galatea are two characters from Greek mythology.

Pygmalion and Galatea may also refer to:

- Pygmalion and Galatea (play), a play by W. S. Gilbert
- Pygmalion and the Image series, a series of paintings by Edward Burne-Jones
- Pygmalion and Galatea (Gauffier), a 1797 painting by Louis Gauffier
- Pygmalion and Galatea (Girodet), an 1819 painting by Anne-Louis Girodet de Roussy-Trioson
- Pygmalion and Galatea (Gérôme painting), a painting by Jean-Léon Gérôme
- Pygmalion and Galatea (film), a 1898 film by Georges Méliès

== See also ==
- Galatea, or Pygmalion Reversed, a musical parody on Gilbert's play Pygmalion and Galatea, by Henry Pottinger Stephens and Meyer Lutz
