= Horace Coignet =

French amateur violinist, singer and composer

Horace Coignet (13 May 1736 – 29 August 1821) was a French amateur violinist, singer and composer. He was active in Lyons as a pattern-designer and dealer in embroidered goods, as an official clerk and as musical director of the city from 1794. He became the music instructor to the Duchesse d'Aumont in Paris (at the same time serving as corresponding member of the Lyons Academy), and later returned to Lyons where he served on the directorial board of the conservatory. He was known as a gifted violinist, and composed harpsichord pieces, romances, a set of Trois duos concertants de violon et fugues, a revolutionary hymn for the Rousseau celebration at Lyons (14 October 1794) and some theatrical music (including an opera comique, Le medicin de l'amour, and an overture to La Harpe's Melanie.) His most notable work the music for Jean-Jacques Rousseau's 1762 short play Pygmalion, first performed in Lyon in 1770 was a success and soon became known throughout Europe.

== Sources ==
- http://www.servinghistory.com/topics/Horace_Coignet
