= My Fair Lady (disambiguation) =

My Fair Lady is a 1956 Broadway musical.

My Fair Lady may also refer to:

== Albums ==
- My Fair Lady (Broadway cast recording), 1956
- My Fair Lady (Shelly Manne album), a 1956 album by Shelly Manne & His Friends consisting of jazz versions of songs from the musical
- My Fair Lady (Oscar Peterson Trio album), 1958
- My Fair Lady (London cast recording), 1959
- My Fair Lady (soundtrack), an album containing the soundtrack to the 1964 film
- The Great Songs from "My Fair Lady" and Other Broadway Hits, a 1964 album by Andy Williams

== Film and television ==
- My Fair Lady (film), a 1964 film adaptation of the musical
- My Fair Lady (1958 TV series), an Australian TV series
- My Fair Lady (2003 TV series), a South Korean TV drama series
- My Fair Lady (2009 TV series), a South Korean TV drama series
- My Fair Lady (2016 TV series), a South Korean TV drama series
- "My Fare Lady", an episode of The Simpsons

== Other uses ==
- My Fair Lady, the Singaporean name of the manga series The Wallflower
- "My fair lady", a phrase in the nursery rhyme "London Bridge Is Falling Down"
- 'My Fair Lady', a cultivar of Mandevilla sanderi, also called Dipladenia sanderi and Brazilian jasmine
- "My Fair Lady", a song by of Montreal from their 2016 album Innocence Reaches
- My Fair Lady (cocktail), created by Joe Gilmore
