= Donizetti Monument =

Coordinates: 45°41′44″N 9°40′18″E

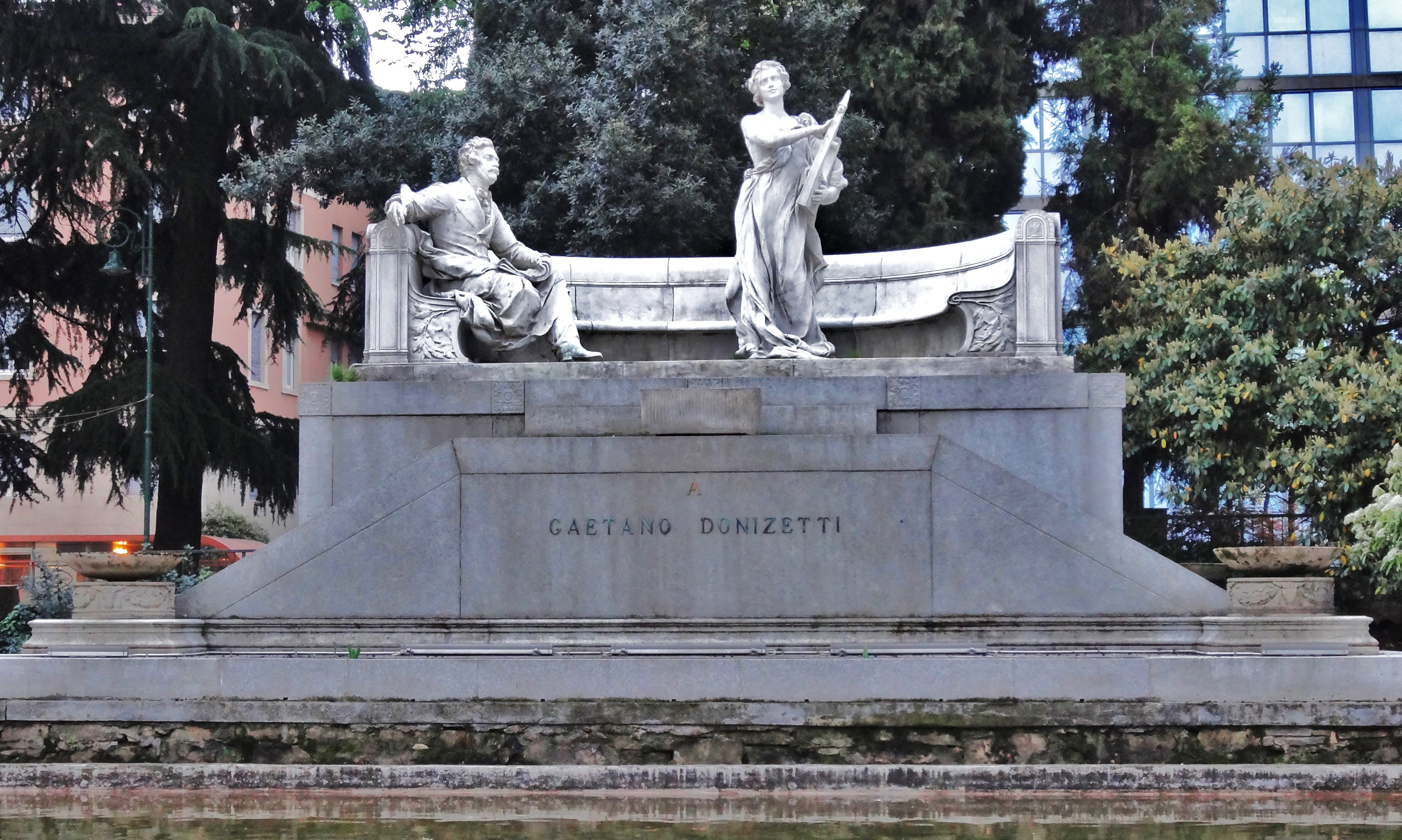
Monument to Donizetti, Bergamo

The Monument to Donizetti is located in a public garden in Piazza Cavour, adjacent to the Teatro Donizetti in Bergamo. It commemorates the opera composer Gaetano Donizetti, a native of Bergamo. It was inaugurated in 1897 to mark the centenary of the composer's birth.

The monument was designed by Francesco Jerace as a result of a competition. The statuary group is atop a plain plinth engraved only with the composers name. The monument is surrounded by a Basin. Atop, Donizetti sits, realistically depicted, and bound to present world, in the corner of a curved bench. A short distance away stands the lyrical muse, Melpomene, strumming her lyre. The artist, with eyes closed, listens to his inspiration. The statue mixes both realism and the allegory to classical mythology; also expressing the sense that the artists communicates with a superior realm. Donizetti's funereal monument in Bergamo, erected in 1856, also features a mournful lyrical muse.
