= Pygmalion (Rousseau) =

Pygmalion is the most influential dramatic work by Jean-Jacques Rousseau, other than his opera Le devin du village. Though now rarely performed, it was one of the first ever melodramas (that is, a play consisting of pantomime gestures and the spoken word, both with a musical accompaniment). It is formed of spoken monodrama with instrumental musical interludes and thus can be credited with spreading a new theatrical genre, especially in German-speaking areas of Europe. He wrote it in 1762, with music by Horace Coignet. It was first performed at the Hôtel de Ville, Lyon, in 1770. The work is considered a turning point for its author, who also wrote The Social Contract that same year.

== History ==
Rousseau probably wrote his text in 1762, but hesitated to put on a production of it, complaining of his lack of skill (in Pygmalion's case in life-giving, in Rousseau's in music-writing). The merchant and amateur composer Horace Coignet allowed him to realise it by writing a score and an overture, and the complete work was put on by amateurs in the town hall in Lyon in private rooms. As with his one-act opera Le devin du village (1752), Rousseau modelled the production on the Parisian 'Théâtre de la foire'.

Without Rousseau's consent, affirmed by the uniqueness of the premiere and the truth of the statue's first interpreter, the play remained in the repertory of the Comédie-Française for about five years in his own 1775 version.

== Motivation ==
During the creation of the sculpture without divine help, music plays a crucial role, just as Rousseau had planned. The inclusion of music seems to have been more important than the type of music included, since the composition of the musical numbers was not nearly as ambitious as in his ballet-opera Les muses galantes (1745). This shows a change of intention in the use of music – the music no longer complains of its inevitable fading away, but is instead a sign of the statue coming to life, as a cipher for the imagination of the viewer.

== Analysis ==
The tale of the sculptor Pygmalion, who unhappily falls in love with one of his own sculptures until the goddess Venus takes pity on him and brings the sculpture to life, stems from Ovid's Metamorphoses. The myth remained taboo during the Middle Ages, when any talk of idolatry was forbidden, but from the Renaissance onwards it was adapted in various forms. During the Baroque it provided the plot for several ballets. All the adaptations and ballets showed the futility and hopelessness of Pygmalion's efforts to give the sculpture life and his problem as being solved by divine grace, making Pygmalion an important symbol of vanitas.

Rousseau's version seems to be the first where Pygmalion brings his perfect image to life without divine help – 'Galathée' (Galatea) comes to life at the last stroke of his chisel, beginning to speak and recognising her creator as her mirror image. She touches herself and says "me", then touches another sculpture and says "not me", and finally Pygmalion and says "Me again". This dialogue with her mirror image is genuine dialogue, reversing the vanitas motif. Importantly, Pygmalion is shown as swearing eternal fidelity to his sculpture, rather than as a collector of sculptures or women. In Jean-Philippe Rameau's opera Pigmalion (1748), from which Rousseau worked hard to differ, the main character is always fixated on the image of the unfaithful lover, drawing on a long tradition of portraying Pygmalion as a misogynist. In the opera, the statue is not brought to life by the artist but by Cupid's help.

1762 also saw the composition of the libretto for Gluck's opera Orfeo ed Euridice, premiered later that year, in which Orpheus gives his dead wife Eurydice life through song, instead of losing faith in the gods. Unlike Pygmalion, the opera still insists on divine intervention to give life, again via Eros, who intervenes to rescue her and bring her back to life after Orpheus turns around and condemns her back to death. Even so, Orfeo and Pygmalion both demonstrate the 1760s theme of an apparent failure by overturning an artist's success, which arose again around the time of Beethoven and then held sway until the First World War (it can also be seen in Strauss's Also sprach Zarathustra).
