= Marco Gallarino =

Italian philosopher and scholar (1975-...)

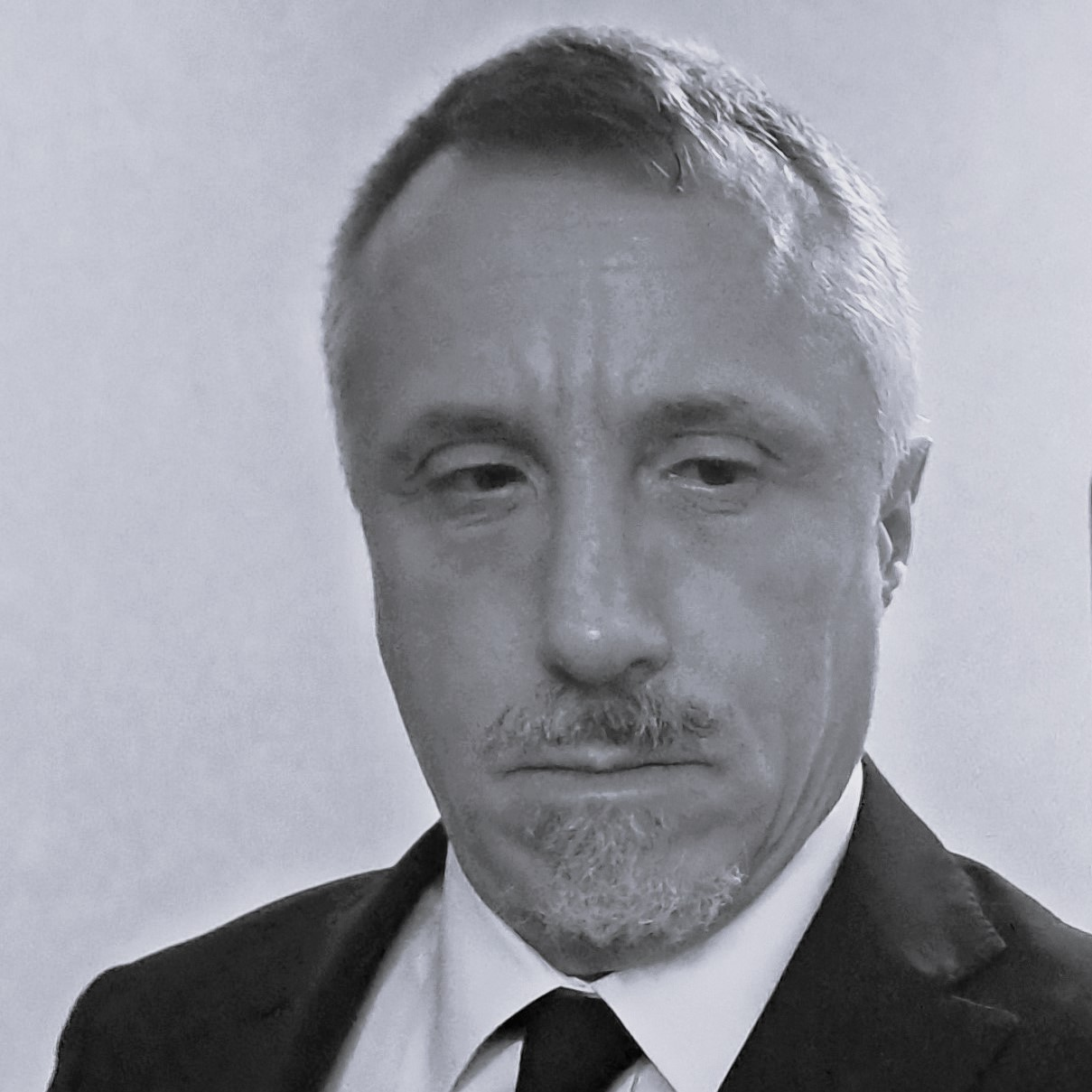
- Born: 7 April 1975 (age 51); Milan, Italy
- Awards: Knight of the Order of Merit of the Italian Republic (2023); Arrigo Pacchi Prize, University of Milan (2004)

Academic background
- Education: University of Milan (MA); University of Milan (PhD)
- Doctoral advisor: Mariateresa Fumagalli Beonio Brocchieri

Academic work
- Discipline: History of Philosophy
- Sub-discipline: Dante Studies

Marco Gallarino (Italian pronunciation: [ˈmarko ɡallaˈriːno]; born 7 April 1975, Milan) is an Italian philosopher and historian of philosophy. He has been awarded the honor of Knight of the Order of Merit of the Italian Republic in 2023 by decree of the President of the Italian Republic, as head of the orders of knighthood, upon the recommendation of the Italian Prime Minister (President of the Council of Ministers).

== Biography ==
After attending courses at the Faculty of Letters and Philosophy at the University of Milan, Gallarino earned a degree in philosophy (a master's level degree) under the supervision of the medievalist Mariateresa Fumagalli Beonio Brocchieri, with a thesis in the history of medieval philosophy on the presence of doctrines related to the Liber de causis in the works of Dante Alighieri.

After being a scholarship holder for two academic years at the Italian Institute for Historical Studies in Naples, founded by Benedetto Croce, where he conducted research on Dante's metaphysical and political doctrines under the supervision of the philosopher and member of the Lincei Academy Gennaro Sasso, Gallarino obtained his Ph.D. in Philosophy at the University of Milan, again under the guidance of Mariateresa Fumagalli Beonio Brocchieri, focusing on themes related to Dante's philosophical and metaphysical thought.

In addition to having been an Adjunct Professor (Professore a contratto) at the University of Milan and serving since 2004 as an Expert in the field (Cultore della materia) of the history of medieval philosophy in the Department of Philosophy at the same university, he works as a teacher of literature, philosophy, and history in Italian high schools, under the employment of the Italian Ministry of Education. He has published several studies on Dante's philosophical thought and conducts research in the fields of the history of philosophy, literature, Eastern and Western spirituality, and the history of esoteric doctrines.

Since 2025 he is a member of the executive board of the Lombardy section of the Italian Philosophical Society (Società Filosofica Italiana).

He also volunteers in the field of social and cultural activities.

== Research areas ==
Gallarino has primarily focused on the history of medieval philosophy and Dantean philosophy. In his scholarly essays on the subject, he has aimed to analyze the structure and underlying principles of Dante Alighieri's cosmological, cosmogonical, and metaphysical thought. He has sought to demonstrate the unity and coherence of Dante's philosophy, despite the evolving spiritual sensibility of the Florentine poet. He identifies Dante's intention to convey a profound and coherent theological and metaphysical truth as the very foundation of the unity of his message. In doing so, he has often challenged interpretations of Dante's thought that tend to undermine the doctrinal, theological and metaphysical unity of his works. He has thus emphasized the constant spiritual and truth-seeking nature of nearly all of Dante's writings.

Beyond his studies on Dante, he conducts research in the fields of spirituality and the history of esotericism, and in this area he has delivered several lectures and presentations at seminars and public events. He has also published newspaper articles on several topics.

== Membership in scientific societies ==
Since 2005, he has been a member of the Italian Society for the Study of Medieval Thought (Società italiana per lo studio del pensiero medievale - SISPM), since 2008 of the International Council of Museums (ICOM), since 2009 of the Italian Dante Society (Società Dantesca Italiana - SDI), and since 2024 of the Italian Philosophical Society (Società Filosofica Italiana - SFI).

== Academic awards ==
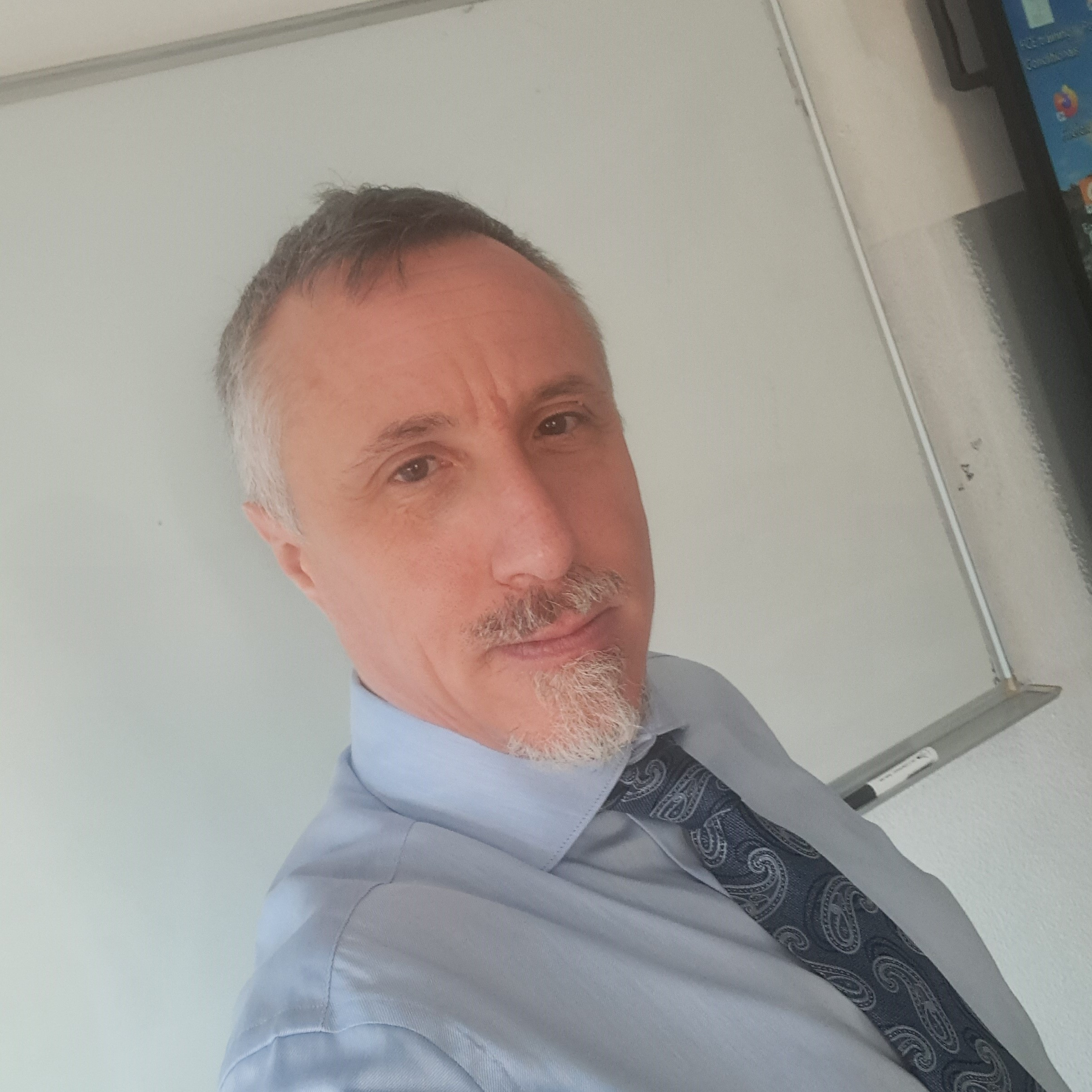
Marco Gallarino in 2024

In 2004, he received the Arrigo Pacchi Prize, issued by the University of Milan and dedicated to thesis works in the field of historical-philosophical studies.

== Honors and awards ==
Knight of the Order of Merit of the Italian Republic (Cavaliere dell'Ordine al Merito della Repubblica Italiana) - ribbon for ordinary uniform

Knight of the Order of Merit of the Italian Republic (Cavaliere dell'Ordine al Merito della Repubblica Italiana)
— 27 December 2023

== Scientific and academic publications ==
=== Scholarly monographs ===
- Metafisica e cosmologia in Dante. Il tema della rovina angelica, Bologna, Il Mulino, 2013 (Pubblicazioni dell’Istituto italiano per gli studi storici, 63), pp. x-170, ISBN 978-88-15-24504-5

=== Scientific articles ===
==== Journal articles ====
- Note sulla dottrina della causazione nel pensiero di Dante Alighieri, in «Annali dell’Istituto Italiano per gli Studi Storici», XX 2003/2004 (2005), pp. 5–44, ISSN 0578-9931
- Il soggetto degli elementi: note sul ventinovesimo canto del Paradiso, in «Annali dell’Istituto Italiano per gli Studi Storici», XXI 2005 (2007), pp. 49–68, ISSN 0578-9931
- Riflessioni sulla filosofia politica dantesca alla luce delle critiche di Guido Vernani da Rimini, in «Annali dell’Istituto Italiano per gli Studi Storici», XXII 2006/2007 (2008), pp. 87–112, ISSN 0578-9931

==== Contributions in miscellaneous volumes and conference proceedings ====
- Nobiltà e ricchezza nel quarto trattato del Convivio, in Identità cittadina e comportamenti socio-economici tra Medioevo ed Età Moderna, a cura di Paolo Prodi, Maria Giuseppina Muzzarelli e Stefano Simonetta, Bologna, CLUEB, 2007, pp. 231–240, ISBN 978-88-491-2851-2
- Orrore infernale. Arte e verità nella prima cantica dantesca, in L’orrore nelle arti. Prospettive estetiche sull’immaginazione del limite, a cura di Manuele Bellini, Milano, Lucisano, 2008, pp. 125–134, ISBN 978-88-89078-31-0 (seconda edizione accresciuta nell’apparato di note; prima edizione ridotta in L’orrore nelle arti. Prospettive estetiche sull’immaginazione del limite, a cura di Manuele Bellini, Napoli, Scripta Web, 2007, pp. 115–123)
- Il ruolo cosmogonico della rovina angelica nel pensiero di Dante, in Cosmogonie e cosmologie nel Medioevo. Atti del Convegno della Società Italiana per lo Studio del Pensiero Medievale (S.I.S.P.M.). Catania, 22-24 settembre 2006, a cura di Concetto Martello, Chiara Militello e Andrea Vella, Louvain-la-Neuve, Brepols (Fédération Internationale des Instituts d’Études Médiévales), 2008, pp. 79–88, ISBN 978-2-503-52951-6
- L’immaginazione tra psicologia e poesia nella Divina Commedia, in Immaginario e immaginazione nel Medioevo. Atti del convegno della Società Italiana per lo Studio del Pensiero Medievale (S.I.S.P.M.), Milano, 25-27 settembre 2008, a cura di M. Bettetini e F. Paparella, con la collaborazione di R. Furlan, Louvain-la-Neuve, Brepols (Fédération Internationale des Instituts d’Études Médiévales), 2009 (Textes et Études du Moyen Âge, 51), pp. 339–351, ISBN 978-2-503-53150-2

=== Encyclopedic entries ===
- Dante, in Ereticopedia. Dizionario di eretici, dissidenti e inquisitori nel mondo mediterraneo, Firenze, Edizioni CLORI, 2014, ISBN 978-8894241600

=== Book reviews ===
- Lucentini, “Platonismo, ermetismo, eresia nel medioevo”, Fédération internationale des instituts d’études medievales, Louvain la-Neuve 2007, pp XV+519, recensione, in «Schola Salernitana», XIV-XV (2009–2010), pp. 406–411

=== Deposited theses ===
- I fondamenti metafisici del pensiero filosofico di Dante Alighieri. Materia e informazione nel contesto cosmologico e cosmogonico del tema della rovina angelica, tesi dottorale discussa nella sede dell’Università degli Studi di Milano il 18 gennaio 2008 e depositata presso le Biblioteche Nazionali Centrali di Roma e Firenze (pp. 258, cm. 21×29,7)

== See also ==
- Order of Merit of the Italian Republic
- Medieval philosophy
- Dante Alighieri
- Medieval theology
- University of Milan
