= Alfredo Panzini =

Italian novelist and lexicographer (1863–1939)

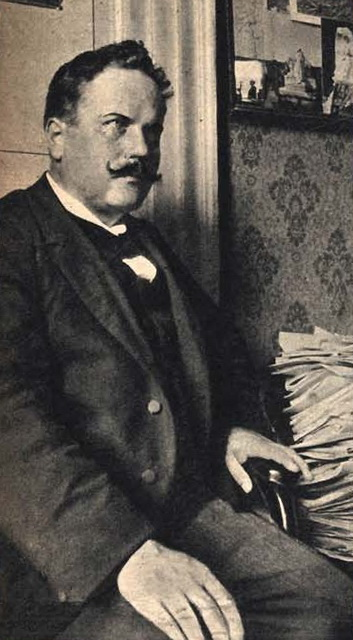
- Born: 31 December 1863; Senigallia, Kingdom of Italy
- Died: 10 April 1939 (aged 75); Rome, Kingdom of Italy
- Resting place: Cimitero di Canonica
- Education: University of Bologna
- Occupations: Novelist; intellectual; historian; teacher
- Spouse: Clelia Gabrielli (m. 1890)
- Children: 4
- Writing career
- Language: Italian
- Genres: Novel; treatise
- Notable works: Il libro dei morti La lanterna di Diogene; Santippe
- Movement: Verismo

Signature
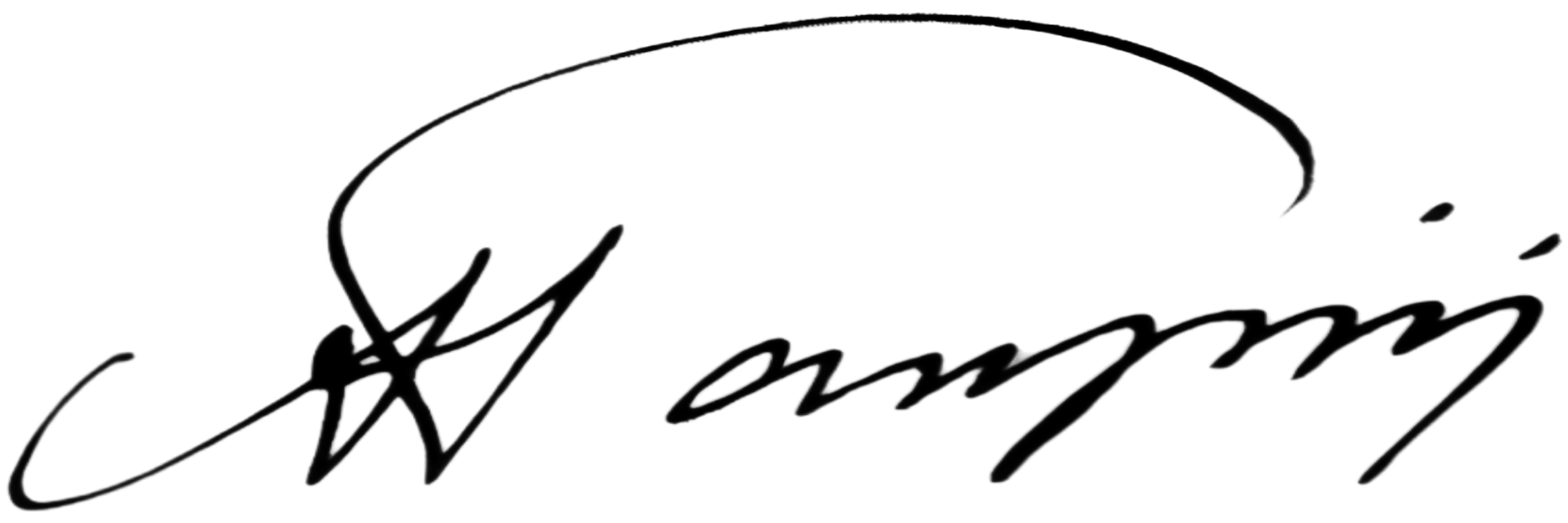

Alfredo Panzini (31 December 1863 – 10 April 1939) was an Italian novelist, critic, historical writer, and lexicographer. A prolific and popular writer, Panzini is famous in Italy for his brilliant and amusing humorous stories.

== Biography ==
Alfredo Panzini was born at Senigallia, the son of Emilio Panzini, a physician, and Filomena (Santini) Panzini. Panzini spent his early life at Rimini. He was educated at the Marco Foscarini Lyceum in Venice and at the University of Bologna, where his teacher was the great poet Giosuè Carducci. He graduated from University of Bologna with a degree in literature and a thesis on macaronic Latin poet Teofilo Folengo.

Panzini was Carducci's lifelong disciple. He himself became a teacher. In 1886 he was appointed to the Ginnasio Governativo of Castellammare di Stabia, a small town on the gulf of Salerno. He taught the second year class in Italian, Latin, History and Geography. In 1888, he was transferred to the Ginnasio Giuseppe Parini in Milan. In July 1890 he married Clelia Gabrielli; they had three sons (one deceased) and a daughter. In 1897 he was called by Senator Francesco Brioschi to teach Italian literature in the preparatory school of the Polytechnic University of Milan. He did not, however, give up his teaching duties at the Parini, but retained both positions and continued with his private tutoring. In 1905, in fact, he undertook a third teaching position at the Circolo Filologico. In 1907, after 19 years, he left the Parini but continued in both the other two teaching positions. In 1918 Panzini moved to Rome, where he taught at the Istituto Leonardo da Vinci until 1924 and then at the Liceo Terenzio Mamiani. In 1924 he began contributing to the cultural page the Corriere della Sera. In 1927 he retired to Bellaria, a quiet village on the Adriatic, where he spent the rest of his life.

Panzini welcomed the advent of Fascism. In 1925 he was one of the signers of the Manifesto of the Fascist Intellectuals, and in 1929 he was among the first members of the Royal Academy of Italy named by Mussolini.

A prolific writer, Panzini published some forty-six volumes of narrative, belles-lettres, and literary, historical, and linguistic studies. He began his literary career in 1893 with Il Libro dei morti (The book of the dead), and during his life published about thirty more books. He is noted for the humorous and often genial tone of his writings. His style, however influenced by contemporary decadentism, is delicate and lyrical, at the opposite extreme from the poetic and rhetorical complexities of D'Annunzio. Trained by a great classicist, Panzini developed great sensitivity toward classical literature, Greek, Latin and Italian. In 1928 he published an Italian translation of Hesiod's Works and Days (first in Nuova Antologia and then in a little volume brought out by Treves). His reverence for Homer, Catullus, Hesiod, Vergil, Boiardo, and Ariosto (to mention a few of his favorite authors) is reflected in the pages of the numerous books he wrote during his life. His style, often worked with a proverbial fine artist's file, was carefully chiseled so as to translate into literature the idyllic and pastoral world he longed for. His sentimental and ironic sketches, stories and travel impressions (La lanterna di Diogene, 1909; Santippe, 1914; Novelle d'ambo i sessi, 1918; Viaggio di un povero letterato, 1919; Il Mondo è Rotondo, 1926), and various novels and tales were widely circulated after World War I and during the first years of the Fascist regime.

The idiosyncratic Italian dictionary he authored, Dizionario moderno, covered all forms of the language including slang. Panzini's dictionary contains words and expressions from all fields, of all origins, and in numerous languages. Thus Latin, Greek, French, English phrases and words are registered.

The success of the work was immediate and quite unexpected by both the author and the publisher. The reason for this was twofold. On the one hand the volume served a real purpose, since most Italian dictionaries were very conservative and refused to include any of the newly-coined words whose origin was not untainted, On the other hand Panzini's presentation of the material was very original and definitely superior to that of other contemporary dictionaries of a similar nature.

After the first initial success Panzini continued to collect words and very soon he began to prepare a second edition. A characteristic of this dictionary was that, in order to retain its value, it had to keep up with the spoken language which, of course, was in a state of continual flux. The consequences were that new words would continually be entering the language and therefore would become eligible to enter Panzini's dictionary, while at the same time certain words, which had temporarily enjoyed a degree of popularity, would quickly disappear and had to be discarded. In order to keep up with this changing situation Panzini published no less than eight editions of the dictionary, each of which was enormously successful. Panzini's Dizionario Moderno was re-edited ten times up to 1963.

Panzini also penned several historical works, including a famous biography of Camillo Benso, Count of Cavour. He died in Rome on April 10, 1939, at the age of 75. La Casa Rossa, the villa in Bellaria where the writer spent with the family much of his years, was opened to the public in 2007. Today it is an important centre for literary events and the seat of the Accademia Panziniana.

== Works ==
=== Novels and short stories ===
- 1893 – Il libro dei morti: romanzo, (reissued 1941)
- 1896 – Gli ingenui, Galli di Chiesa & Guindani (reissued 1898, 2014, 2017)
- 1899 – Moglie nuova: romanzo, Editrice Galli
- 1901 – Piccole storie del mondo grande, Treves (reissued 1905, 1906, 1913, 1917, 1918, 1919, 1920, 1926, 1932, 1935, 1941, 2009)
- 1901 – Lepida et trìstia (novelle), Tip. Agnelli (reissued 1902)
- 1903 – Trionfi di donna: novelle, Soc. Edit. La Poligrafica
- 1907 – La lanterna di Diogene, Treves (reissued 1917, 1918, 1919, 1920, 1925, 1927, 1944, 1952, 1999, 2006, 2008, 2009, 2017)
- 1911 – Le fiabe della virtù, Treves (reissued 1925, 1941, 2009 with two letters from Vincenzo Cardarelli and Sibilla Aleramo)
- 1912 – Che cos'è l'amore?, Società Editrice Italiana
- 1913 – Santippe: piccolo romanzo fra l'antico e il moderno, Treves (reissued 1914, 1915, 1917, 1919, 1921, 1925, 1930, 1938, 1941, 1943, 1945, 1954, 2014)
- 1914 – Donne, madonne e bimbi, Studio editoriale lombardo (reissued 1921, 1939)
- 1914 – Il romanzo della guerra nell'anno 1914, Studio editoriale lombardo (reissued 1915, 1995 with a preface by Giorgio Bàrberi Squarotti, 1996, 2014, 2015)
- 1916 – La Madonna di Mamà: romanzo del tempo della guerra, Treves (reissued 1918, 1919, 1921, 1926, 2010, 2016)
- 1918 – Fiabe della virtù, Treves (reissued 1919, 1925)
- 1919 – Il libro dei morti: romanzo, La Voce (reissued 1924, 1932)
- 1919 – Novelle d'ambo i sessi, Treves (reissued 1920, 1921, 1941, 1945, 1954)
- 1919 – Viaggio di un povero letterato, Treves (reissued 1920, 1954, 2015)
- 1920 – Io cerco moglie!: romanzo, Treves (reissued 1924, 1934, 1939, 1941, 1943, 1946, 1955, 2014)
- 1920 – Il diavolo nella mia libreria, Mondadori (reissued 1921, 1926, 2012, 2014, 2019)
- 1920 – Il mondo è rotondo: romanzo, Treves (reissued 1921)
- 1921 – Signorine, Mondadori (reissued 1922, 1926)
- 1921 – La cagna nera: racconto, La Voce (reissued 1991)
- 1922 – II padrone sono me!: romanzo, Mondadori (reissued 1925, 1927, 1930, 1935, 1949, 1955, 1967, 1975, 1985, 1994, 1995, 2000, 2009, 2014)
- 1923 – Diario sentimentale della guerra: dal dicembre 1914 al novembre 1918, Mondadori (reissued 1924, 1926, 2011)
- 1924 – La vera istoria dei tre colori, Mondadori (reissued 1926, 2011)
- 1925 – La Pulcella senza pulcellaggio, Mondadori, (reissued 1929, 1949, 2009, 2013)
- 1926 – Le damigelle, Mondadori
- 1926 – I tre re con Gelsomino buffone del Re: romanzo, Mondadori (reissued 1927, 1931)
- 1929 – l giorni del sole e del grano, Mondadori (reissued 1940, 1941, 2012)
- 1930 – Il libro dei morti e dei vivi, Mondadori (reissued 2009)
- 1930 – La penultima moda: 1850-1930, Cremonese (reissued 1996, 2003)
- 1932 – La sventurata Irminda: libro per pochi e per molti, Mondadori
- 1932 – Il mondo è rotondo: romanzo, Mondadori (reissued 1938)
- 1933 – Rose d'ogni mese, Mondadori (reissued 1959)
- 1934 – Novelline divertenti per bambini intelligenti, (reissued 1938, 1944, 1946, 1949, 1953, 1956, 1961, 1966, 1967, 1970, 1983, 1984, 1988, 2011)
- 1934 – Legione decima: romanzo fra l'anno XII dell'età fascista e l'anno 58 a. C., Mondadori (reissued 1938)
- 1935 – Pagine dell'alba, Mondadori, (reissued 1938, 1940, 1942, 2010)
- 1935 – Viaggio con la giovane ebrea, Mondadori (reissued 1955)
- 1936 – Il ritorno di Bertoldo, Mondadori
- 1937 – Il bacio di Lesbia: romanzo, Mondadori (reissued 1938, 1939, 1941, 1949, 1958, 2000, 2009)
- 1939 – Sei romanzi fra due secoli, Mondadori (reissued 1940, 1941, 1942, 1943, 1944, 1954)
- 1942 – La valigetta misteriosa e altri racconti, Mondadori (reissued 1944)
- 1950 – La cicuta, i gigli e le rose, a cura di Marino Moretti, Mondadori
- 1958 – Scritti scelti, Mondadori
- 1966 – Il cuore del passero e altre novelle, Mondadori
- 1970 – Goffredo Bellonci (ed.), Opere scelte, Mondadori
- 2012 – La sventurata Irminda, Accademia Panziniana
- 2014 – Un vicino di casa di nome Alfredo: la vendetta dei cardellini e altri racconti, Accademia Panziniana
- 2016 – Audacia da ladro, Lisciani

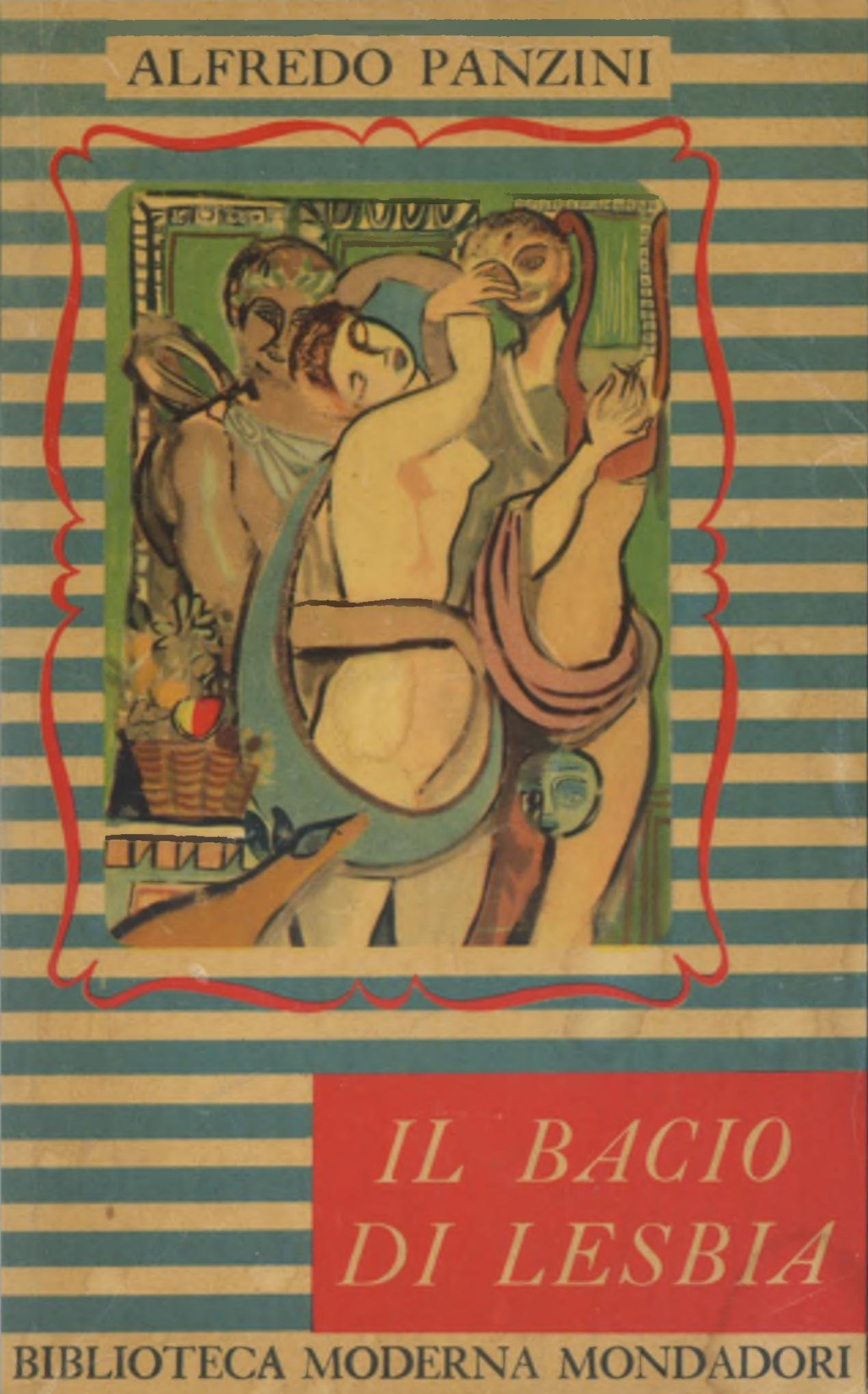
Alfredo Panzini, Il bacio di Lesbia

=== Literary Essays ===
- 1894 – L'evoluzione di Giosuè Carducci, Chiesa & Guindani
- 1918 – Matteo Maria Boiardo, G. Principato
- 1921 – Dante nel VI centenario: per la gioventù e per il popolo, L. Trevisini (reissued 2015)
- 1924 – Le più belle pagine di Maria Matteo Boiardo, Treves
- 1933 – La bella storia di Orlando innamorato e poi furioso, Mondadori (reissued 1943, 1994, 2009)
- 1997 – Vita, carattere e opinioni del nobil'uomo Monaldo Leopardi, M. Boni

=== Essays ===
- 1909 – Il 1859. Da Plombières a Villafranca: storia narrata, Treves (reissued 1914, 1918, 1921, 1926)
- 1930 – Il nuovo volto dell'Italia, con 141 fotografie di Axel von Graefe, Mondadori
- 1931 – Romagna, Nemi (reissued 1982, 1996)
- 1931 – Il conte di Cavour, Mondadori (reissued 1932, 1933, 1935, 1939, 1940, 1942, 1943, 1958, 1959)
- 1948 – Per amore di Biancofiore: ricordi di poeti e di poesia; a cura di M. Valgimigli, Le Monnier
- 1994 – Sigismondo Malatesta: profilo eroico, Verrucchio
- 1997 – Nelle Marche e in Umbria: nella terra dei santi e dei poeti, M. Boni
- 2001 – Viaggi in Italia, 1913-1920 / Alfredo Panzini & Mario Puccini, Fondazione Rosellini per la letteratura popolare

=== Dictionaries and school books ===
- 1887 – Saggio critico sulla poesia maccheronica, Tip. Elzeviriana
- 1899 – Nuova antologia latina: per la I e II ginnasiale: con passi tolti dalla Bibbia, dagli Evangeli, dal Petrarca, dal Pontano, da M. Ficino, Vegezio, Catone e Plauto, Albrighi-Segati & C.
- 1905 – Dizionario moderno. Supplemento ai Dizionari italiani, Ulrico Hoepli (reissued 1908, 1918, 1923, 1927, 1931, 1935, 1942, 1950, 1963, 1969)
- 1912 – La nostra patria: corso di storia per le scuole secondarie (ginnasiali, tecniche e complementari), L. Trevisini
- 1912 – Manualetto di retorica: ad uso delle scuole secondarie inferiori: con numerosi esempi e dichiarazioni, Bemporad (reissued 1913, 1915, 1916, 1919, 1920, 1922, 1926, 1928)
- 1914 – Semplici nozioni di grammatica italiana: con esercizi ed esempi ad uso delle scuole medie inferiori, L. Trevisini (reissued 1929, 1930, 1931, 1932, 1933, 1934, 1935)
- 1920 – Il libro di lettura delle scuole popolari, La Voce
- 1921 – Il melograno: letture per la gioventù e per il popolo, R. Bemporad & F. et Sansoni (reissued 1922, 1926, 1928, 1935, 1936, 1940, 1941)
- 1929 – La nostra gente: Testo di storia per le scuole secondarie di avviamento al lavoro, 6 vols., with Maria D'Angelo
- 1930 – La Parola e la Vita: dalla grammatica all'analisi stilistica e letteraria, avec Augusto Vicinelli, Bemporad (reissued 1931, 1932, 1933, 1934, 1935, 1937, 1938, 1939, 1940, 1941, 1942, 1945, 1946, 1947, 1948, 1951, 1952, 1953, 1954, 1961, 1963, 1965, 1968)
- 1932 – Guida alla grammatica italiana: con un prontuario delle incertezze: libretto utile per ogni persona, Bemporad (reissued 1933, 1934, 1935)
- 1940 – Grammatica italiana, Mondadori (reissued 1941, 1943, 1945, 1946, 1950, 1952, 1955, 1956, 1957, 1962, 1982, 1983, 1986, 1989, 1991, 1999, 2017)

=== Translations ===
- 1891 – Le Bucoliche di Virgilio con raffronti e traduzione originale d'una scelta degli Idilli di Teocrito, nuovamente volgarizzati a maggiore intelligenza del testo, D. Briola (reissued 1893)
- 1891 – Elegie di Ovidio e di Tibullo / scelte e commentate dal dott. Alfredo Panzini, D. Briola (Éditions: 1898)
- 1899 – Nuova Antologia latina. Brani tratti da autori della bassa latinità e medievali, Albrighi e Segati (reissued 1909)
- 1928 – Hesiod, Le Opere e i Giorni, versione in prosa italiana, Treves (reissued 1990, 2015)
- 1930 – Henry Murger, Vita di Bohème, (Scènes de la vie de bohème), Mondadori (reissued 1933, 1944, 1955, 1969, 1971, 2015)

=== Prefaces and introductions ===
- 1924 – Marino Moretti, Mia madre, prefazione di Alfredo Panzini, Treves (reissued 1926, 1928, 1935)
- 1935 – Mostra personale di Lino Baccarini: marzo 1935-18 / presentazione di Alfredo Panzini, Rizzoli & C.

=== In translation ===
- Wanted—a Wife [Io cerco moglie!]. Translated by Frederic Taber Cooper. New York: N.L. Brown. 1922.
- The affairs of the major [Le vicende del maggiore]. Translated by E. S. Hole. The Holerth Press. 1922.
- George L. Doty, ed. (1934). Novelle. The University of Chicago Press.

=== Correspondence ===
- 1940 – Carteggio Alfredo Panzini-Renato Serra.
- 1986 – Carteggio Panzini-Moretti 1914-1936, edited by Claudio Toscani.
- 1990 – Carteggio Panzini-Prezzolini 1911-1937, edited by Sandro Rogari.
- Claudio Marabini, ed. (1999). "Scrivimi Clotilde mia: lettere inedite di Alfredo Panzini". Nuova Antologia (in Italian) (2211). Florence: Le Monnier: 236–262.
