= Mariateresa Fumagalli Beonio Brocchieri =

Italian scholar of mediaval philosophy(1933-...)

Mariteresa Fumagalli Beonio Brocchieri
- Born: Mariateresa Fumagalli; June 12, 1933; Milan, Italy

Academic background
- Education: University of Milan

Academic work
- Discipline: Philosophy
- Sub-discipline: History of medieval philosophy

Mariateresa Fumagalli Beonio Brocchieri (Milan, 12 June 1933) is an Italian historian of philosophy.

== Biography ==
After obtaining a teaching qualification in History of Philosophy, she became a full History of Medieval Philosophy professor at the University of Milan from 1980 to 2008.

She founded the Quodlibet series, which published seventeen volumes between 1986 and 2009 with the Bergamo-based publisher Lubrina. She co-directed the series together with medievalists Luca Bianchi and Massimo Parodi.

She was a visiting professor at the University of Pennsylvania, the University of Buenos Aires and the Hebrew University of Jerusalem.

Until December 2017, she was a member of the editorial board of the Journal of History of Philosophy (Rivista di Storia della Filosofia), founded by her mentor, Mario Dal Pra.

From 1988 to 2003, she collaborated with the cultural supplement of the Italian national daily newspaper Il Sole 24 Ore.

She was co-director of the History of Philosophy Series (Collana di Storia della Filosofia, FrancoAngeli, Milan), co-director of Doctor Virtualis, an online and print journal of medieval philosophy, and a member of the scientific committee of the journal Nuova Civiltà delle Macchine.

Throughout her academic and scientific career, she published dozens of essays, focusing primarily on the history of medieval philosophy, medieval political thought, the presence of women in the intellectual landscape of the Middle Ages, and key figures such as Abelard, John Wycliffe, Hildegard of Bingen and Frederick II of Swabia. Her work has combined scholarly precision with a divulgative intent, gaining recognition in the academic world and among a broader readership.

She authored a History of Medieval Philosophy with Massimo Parodi, a logical and comprehensive representation of medieval philosophical thought. Based on a study of primary sources and the most recent scholarship, this work demonstrates the continuity and complexity of medieval philosophy, which is closely related to theology. In this essay, Mariateresa Beonio Brocchieri and Massimo Parodi focus particularly on key philosophers and major theoretical issues, striving to present a balanced account of the logical, epistemological, metaphysical and scientific debates that were beginning to take shape in medieval universities across Europe.

== Research projects ==
=== Inter-university research projects ===
- 1990-1993: National coordinator of the research project on "Relations between Languages, Knowledge, and Reason from Late Antiquity to the Late Middle Ages" (Universities of Milan, Padua, Siena, and Pavia)
- 1993-1995: national coordinator of the research project on "Theory of knowledge and special languages, 13th-15th centuries" (University of Milan, University of Padua, University of Pavia)
- 1996-2000: National coordinator of the MURST research project on ethical themes in medieval thought (University of Milan, Catholic University of Milan, University of Pavia, University of Padua and University of Trieste)
- 1999-2000: national coordinator of the research project on "Forms of rationality from the 13th to the 15th century: analysis of philosophical, theological and scientific texts" (University of Milan, Catholic University of the Sacred Heart of Milan, University of Padua, University of Pavia, University of Trieste)
- 2001-2002: local coordinator of the MURST research project "Reason and Ethics in Thought and Institutions between the Middle Ages and the Modern Age: Politics, Economics, and Law." Research of the local unit: "Justice, Tolerance, and Principles of Legitimacy in Ethical-Political Thought (12th-16th Centuries)."
- 2003: Funding for FIRST research on the theme "The Status and Justifications of Just War in Philosophical Reflection from Augustine to Gerson."
- 2003: Submission of a MURST research project on the theme "Political Power, Common Good, and Private Wealth: Theory and Practice Toward Modernity."
- 2004: Participation in the research project on "Common Good, Private Good, and the Use of Wealth in Late Medieval Philosophical Reflection (13th-15th Centuries)," within the framework of a national research project titled "Public Good and Private Wealth: Politics, Economics, and Law in Theory and Practice Toward Modernity," funded by the Italian Ministry of University and Research and coordinated by Prof. G. Todeschini of the University of Trieste. Local research unit coordinator at the University of Milan: Stefano Simonetta. Professors and researchers participating in the local research unit: Mariateresa Fumagalli Beonio Brocchieri, Massimo Parodi, Massimo Campanini, Gianluca Briguglia, Claudio Fiocchi, Roberta Frigeni, Marco Gallarino et alii.

=== Italian National Research Council Projects ===
- 1982-1984: "Parallel Analysis of Philosophical, Legal, and Literary Texts by (a) Christian Masters and Preachers, (b) Jewish Masters, Talmudic Glossators in the Same Historical-Geographical Area: France in the 12th-14th Centuries."
- 1989-1991: "The Philosopher and the Theologian: Autonomy of Philosophical Reflection and Theological Discourse in the 14th Century Through Doctrinal Controversies and Political-Cultural Conflicts."
- 1991-1993: "Medieval Commentaries (13th Century) on Aristotle's De Anima : Aristotelian Anthropology, New Ethical and Epistemological Doctrines Compared with Theological Tradition."
- 1994-1996: "Medieval Theology and Epistemology."
- 1997-1999: "The Relations Between Medieval and Modern European Philosophy."

== Publications ==
- Corpi gloriosi: Eroi greci e santi cristiani, Collana Storia e Società, Laterza 2012, ISBN 978-88-420-9023-6
- Eloisa e Abelardo, Laterza 2014, ISBN 978-88-581-1463-6
- Federico II. Ragione e fortuna, Roma-Bari, Laterza, 2004
- Il filosofo e la città nel Medioevo, in Atti del convegno "I filosofi e la città", Francavilla al Mare 16-18 novembre 2000, a cura di Carlo Tatasciore, Istituto Italiano per gli Studi Filosofici - Società Filosofica Italiana, Sezione di Francavilla al Mare, La Città del Sole, 2003, pp. 51–66
- AA.VV., John Wyclif: logica, politica, teologia. Atti del Convegno Internazionale - Milano, 12-13 febbraio 1999, a cura di Mariateresa Fumagalli Beonio Brocchieri e Stefano Simonetta, premessa di Mariateresa Fumagalli Beonio Brocchieri, Firenze, SISMEL - Edizioni del Galluzzo, 2003
- Guerra, per i cristiani era il simbolo della Caduta, in Reset 76 (Marzo - Aprile 2003)
- Profilo del pensiero medievale, in collaborazione con Gianluca Briguglia, Roma-Bari, Laterza, 2002
- L'estetica medievale, Bologna, Il Mulino, 2002
- Ma è possibile moderare l'Onnipotente? in Reset 69 (Gennaio - Febbraio 2002)
- Marsilio da Padova, Il difensore della pace, introduzione di Mariateresa Fumagalli Beonio Brocchieri, traduzione e note di Mario Conetti, Claudio Fiocchi, Stefano Radice e Stefano Simonetta, Milano, Biblioteca Universale Rizzoli, 2001
- Il meraviglioso, in Milano. Meraviglie. Miracoli. Misteri, a cura di Roberta Cordani, Milano, Casa Editrice Libreria Internazionale Partipilo, 2001, pp. 6–7
- Tre storie gotiche. Idee e uomini del Medioevo, Bologna, Il Mulino, 2000
- Il pensiero politico medievale, con la collaborazione di Mario Conetti e Stefano Simonetta, Roma-Bari, Laterza, 2000
- Ildegarda di Bingen. Invito alla lettura di Mariateresa Fumagalli Beonio Brocchieri, traduzione dei brani di Claudio Fiocchi, Cinisello Balsamo (Milano), San Paolo, 2000
- Potentia absoluta - potentia ordinata: une longue histoire au moyen-âge, in Potentia Dei. L'onnipotenza divina nel pensiero dei secoli XVI e XVII, a cura di Guido Canziani, Miguel A. Granda, Yves Charles Zarka, Milano, Franco Angeli, 2000, pp. 13–23
- Pico della Mirandola, Casale Monferrato, Piemme, 1999
- Le due chiese. Progetti di riforma politico-religiosa nei secoli XII-XV, a cura di Mariateresa Fumagalli Beonio Brocchieri, Milano, Unicopli, 1998 (Introduzione alle pp. 9–78)
- Riccardo da Bury, Philobiblon, o l'amore per i libri, introduzione di Mariateresa Fumagalli Beonio Brocchieri, traduzione e note di Riccardo Fedriga, Milano, Rizzoli, 1998
- Guglielmo d'Ockham, La spada e lo scettro. Due scritti politici, introduzione di Mariateresa Fumagalli Beonio Brocchieri; traduzione, note e schede di Stefano Simonetta, Milano, Biblioteca Universale Rizzoli, 1997
- Numero monografico della Rivista di Storia della Filosofia sul pensiero politico medievale a cura di Mariateresa Fumagalli Beonio Brocchieri, Nuova serie, 52 (1997 - I), Milano, Franco Angeli
- Premessa. Venti generazioni fa, in Rivista di Storia della Filosofia - Nuova serie, 52 (1997 - I), Milano, Franco Angeli, pp. 7–15
- Lettere di Abelardo e Eloisa, a cura di Mariateresa Fumagalli Beonio Brocchieri (con introduzione della curatrice), trad. di Cecilia Scerbanenco, Milano, Rizzoli, 1996
- Platone e Aristotele nel Medioevo, in Aristotelismo e Platonismo nella cultura del Medioevo, a cura di Arianna Arisi Rota e Massimiliano De Conca, Pavia, Collegio Ghislieri, Ibis, 1996, pp. 33–43
- Genoveffa e il drago. L'avventura di una donna medievale, in collaborazione con Cecilia Scerbanenco, Roma-Bari, Laterza, 1995
- Sant'Agostino, La felicità. La libertà, introduzione di Mariateresa Fumagalli Beonio Brocchieri, traduzione e note di Riccardo Fedriga e Sara Puggioni, Milano, Rizzoli, 1995 (riedizioni 1997 e 2001)
- L'amore passione assoluta, in Storia delle passioni, a cura di Silvia Vegetti Finzi, Roma-Bari, Laterza, 1995 (nuova edizione 2000, pp. 75–100)
- The feminine mind in medieval mysticism, in Creative women in medieval and early modern Italy, a cura di E. Ann Matter e John Coakley, University of Pennsylvania Press, 1995
- Logica e linguaggio nel Medioevo, a cura di Riccardo Fedriga e Sara Puggioni; con una premessa di Mariateresa Fumagalli Beonio Brocchieri, Milano, LED, 1993
- L'età filosofica di Matteo d'Acquasparta, in Matteo d'Acquasparta, francescano, filosofo, politico. Atti del XXIX Convegno storico internazionale. Todi, 11-14 ottobre 1992, Centro Italiano di Studi sull'Alto Medioevo, Spoleto 1993, pp. 1–17 (discorso inaugurale)
- Anselmo d'Aosta: logica e dottrina, Numero monografico della Rivista di Storia della Filosofia a cura di Mariateresa Fumagalli Beonio Brocchieri, Nuova serie, XLVIII (1993 - III), Milano, Franco Angeli
- Anselmo d'Aosta: logica e dottrina. Premessa, in Rivista di Storia della Filosofia - Nuova serie, XLVIII (1993 - III), Milano, Franco Angeli, pp. 453–455
- In una aria diversa. La sapienza di Ildegarda di Bingen, Milano, Mondadori, 1992
- Pietro Abelardo, Dialogo tra un filosofo, un giudeo e un cristiano, introduzione di Mariateresa Fumagalli Beonio Brocchieri, traduzione e note di Cristina Trovò, Milano, Rizzoli, 1992
- Le enciclopedie, in Lo spazio letterario del Medioevo, Roma, 1992, I. Il Medioevo Latino, Vol. I. La produzione del testo, tomo II, pp. 635–657
- L'università: le idee, in Antiche università d'Europa. Storia e personaggi degli atenei nel Medio Evo, a cura di Franco Cardini e Mariateresa Fumagalli Beonio Brocchieri, Milano, G. Mondadori, 1991, pp. 10–27
- Luca Bianchi, Eugenio Randi, Le verità dissonanti: Aristotele alla fine del Medioevo, prefazione di Mariateresa Fumagalli Beonio Brocchieri, Roma-Bari, Laterza, 1990
- Ricordo di Eugenio Randi 1957-1990, in Rivista di Storia della Filosofia - Nuova serie, XLV (1990 - IV), Milano, Franco Angeli, pp. 825–826
- Storia della filosofia medievale. Da Boezio a Wyclif, con Massimo Parodi, Roma-Bari, Laterza, 1989 (terza edizione 1996, quarta edizione 2002)
- Eloisa, l'intellettuale, in F. Bertini, F. Cardini, C. Leonardi, Mt. Fumagalli Beonio Brocchieri, Medioevo al femminile, Roma-Bari, Laterza, 1989 (terza edizione nella collana "Storia e società" 1992; prima edizione nella collana "Economica Laterza" 1996; terza edizione nella collana "Economica Laterza" 2001, pp. 121–144)
- Ildegarda, la profetessa, in F. Bertini, F. Cardini, C. Leonardi, Mt. Fumagalli Beonio Brocchieri, Medioevo al femminile, Roma-Bari, Laterza, 1989 (terza edizione nella collana "Storia e società" 1992; prima edizione nella collana "Economica Laterza" 1996; terza edizione nella collana "Economica Laterza" 2001, pp. 145–169)
- Le bugie di Isotta. Immagini della mente medievale, Roma-Bari, Laterza, 1987 (seconda edizione 2002)
- L'intellettuale, in L'uomo medievale, a cura di Jacques Le Goff, Roma-Bari, Laterza, 1987, (riedizione nella collana "Economica Laterza", Roma-Bari 1993, pp. 203–233), poi in Mariateresa Fumagalli Beonio Brocchieri - Eugenio Garin, L'intellettuale tra Medioevo e Rinascimento, Roma-Bari, Laterza, 1994
- Il pensiero di John Wyclif nel quadro della filosofia del suo secolo, in AA.VV., John Wiclif e la tradizione degli studi biblici in Inghilterra, Genova 1987, pp. 45–59
- Peter Dronke, Donne e cultura nel Medioevo: scrittrici medievali dal II al XIV secolo, prefazione di Mariateresa Fumagalli Beonio Brocchieri, traduzione di Eugenio Randi, Milano, Il saggiatore, 1986
- Sopra la volta del mondo. Onnipotenza e potenza assoluta di Dio tra Medioevo e età moderna, a cura di Mariateresa Beonio Brocchieri, Bergamo, Lubrina, 1986
- Piú cose in cielo e in terra, in AA.VV., Sopra la volta del mondo. Onnipotenza e potenza assoluta di Dio tra Medioevo e età moderna, a cura di Mariateresa Beonio Brocchieri, Bergamo, Lubrina (collana Quodlibet), 1986, pp. 17–31
- Momenti e modelli nella storia dell'enciclopedia. Il mondo musulmano, ebraico e latino a confronto sul tema dell'organizzazione del sapere, Numero monografico della Rivista di Storia della Filosofia a cura di Mariateresa Fumagalli Beonio Brocchieri, Nuova serie, XL (1985 - I), Milano, Franco Angeli
- Momenti e modelli nella storia dell'enciclopedia. Il mondo musulmano, ebraico e latino a confronto sul tema dell'organizzazione del sapere. Premessa, in Rivista di Storia della Filosofia - Nuova serie, XL (1985 - I), Milano, Franco Angeli, pp. 3–6
- Due enciclopedie dell'Occidente medievale: Alessandro Neckam e Bartolomeo Anglico, con Massimo Parodi, in Rivista di Storia della Filosofia - Nuova serie, XL (1985 - I), Milano, Franco Angeli, pp. 51–90
- Giovanni di Salisbury, Policraticus. L'uomo di governo nel pensiero medievale, presentazione di Mariateresa Fumagalli Beonio Brocchieri, introduzione di Luca Bianchi, traduzione di L. Bianchi e P. Feltrin, Milano, Jaca Book, 1984
- Il gentile uomo innamorato. Note sul "De amore", in AA.VV., La storia della filosofia come sapere critico. Studi offerti a Mario Dal Pra, Milano, Franco Angeli, 1984, pp. 36–51
- Eloisa e Abelardo: parole al posto di cose, Milano, A. Mondadori, 1984
- Inos Biffi, Costante Marabelli, Invito al Medioevo, conversazioni con Mariateresa Beonio Brocchieri e altri, Milano, Jaca Book, 1982
- Le enciclopedie dell'occidente medioevale, Torino, Loescher, 1981
- Perché il Medioevo? Il Medioevo nei romanzi contemporanei, in Quaderni medievali, 12 (1981), p. 174-178
- Marsilio e Wyclif: analogie?, in «Medioevo», 6 (1980), pp. 569–575
- Numero monografico della Rivista critica di Storia della Filosofia sul pensiero di Abelardo a cura di Mariateresa Fumagalli Beonio Brocchieri, XXXIV (1979 - IV), Milano, Franco Angeli
- Sull'unità dell'opera abelardiana, in Rivista critica di Storia della Filosofia, XXXIV (1979 - IV), Milano, Franco Angeli, pp. 429–438
- La Chiesa invisibile: riforme politico-religiose nel basso Medioevo, a cura di Mariateresa Fumagalli Beonio Brocchieri, Milano, Feltrinelli, 1978
- Wyclif: il comunismo dei predestinati, Firenze, Sansoni, 1975
- Dalla "Sacra Doctrina" alla "Theologia": Pietro Abelardo (cap. X, pp. 201–235), Filosofia della natura e fede: le scuole di Chartres e di S. Vittore (cap. XI, pp. 237–257), Giovanni di Salisbury, Alano di Lilla e Nicola di Amiens (cap. XII, pp. 259–271), in Storia della filosofia, diretta da Mario Dal Pra, vol. quinto ("La filosofia medievale. dal sec. VI al sec. XII"), Milano, Casa Editrice Dr. Francesco Vallardi - Società Editrice Libraria, 1975–1976
- Ratio, sensus e auctoritas nelle opere di Adelardo di Bath, in Pierre Abélard et Pierre le Vénérable. Les courants philosophiques, littéraires et artistiques en occident au milieu du XIIe siècle, a cura di René Louis, Jean Jolivet e Jean Châtillon (Abbaye de Cluny, 2 au 9 juillet 1972. Actes et mémoires des colloques internationaux du Centre National de la Recherche Scientifique 546), Paris 1975, pp. 631–638, discussione pp. 639–640
- Introduzione a Abelardo, Roma-Bari, Laterza, 1974 (seconda edizione 1988, terza edizione 2000)
- La relation entre logique, physique et theologie, in Peter Abelard. Proceedings of the International Conference, Louvain, 10-12 maggio 1972, a cura di E.M. Buytaert, Leuven The Hague 1974, pp. 153–162
- Étienne Gilson, La filosofia nel Medioevo. Dalle origini patristiche alla fine del XIV secolo, traduzione di Maria Assunta del Torre, aggiornamento bibliografico di Mariateresa Fumagalli Beonio Brocchieri, Firenze, La Nuova Italia, 1973
- Durando di S. Porziano. Elementi filosofici della terza redazione del "Commento alle Sentenze", Firenze, La nuova Italia, 1969
- Note per una indagine del concetto di retorica in Abelardo, in AA.VV., Arts liberaux et philosophie au Moyen Age, Montréal-Paris 1969, pp. 829–832;
- La logica di Abelardo, Firenze, La nuova Italia, 1964 (seconda edizione 1969)
- Note sulla logica di Abelardo. V. L'«Argumentatio», in Rivista critica di Storia della Filosofia, XVIII (1963 - II), Milano, Franco Angeli, pp. 131–146
- Note sulla logica di Abelardo. IV. Il significato della «propositio», in Rivista critica di Storia della Filosofia, XV (1960 - I), Milano, Franco Angeli, pp. 14–21
- Note sulla logica di Abelardo. III. Il significato dei nomi universali, in Rivista critica di Storia della Filosofia, XIV (1959 - I), Milano, Franco Angeli, pp. 3–27
- Note sulla logica di Abelardo. II. Il problema del significato, in Rivista critica di Storia della Filosofia, XIII (1958 - III), Milano, Franco Angeli, pp. 280–290
- Note sulla logica di Abelardo. I. La concezione abelardiana della logica, in Rivista critica di Storia della Filosofia, XIII (1958 - I), Milano, Franco Angeli, pp. 12–26

== See also ==
- John Wycliffe
- Medieval philosophy
- Philosophy
- University of Milan
