= Carla Seatzu =

Italian electrical engineer

Carla Seatzu (born 1971) is an Italian electrical engineer whose research concerns discrete-event simulation, Petri nets, fault detection and isolation, and networked control systems, with applications in manufacturing and transportation. She is an ordinary professor (equivalent to full professor) in the faculty of engineering at the University of Cagliari.

== Education and career ==
Seatzu earned a laurea in electrical engineering in 1996 at the University of Cagliari, at the same time passing the state examination in engineering. She completed her doctorate at the University of Cagliari in 2000. Her dissertation, Decentralized control of open-channel hydraulic systems, was supervised by Elio Usai.

After working as a research assistant and researcher at the University of Cagliari from 2000 to 2011, she became an associate professor there in 2011, and earned a habilitation in 2012–2013. She has been a full professor since 2017.
