= Manifesto of the Anti-Fascist Intellectuals =

Italian document against Fascism

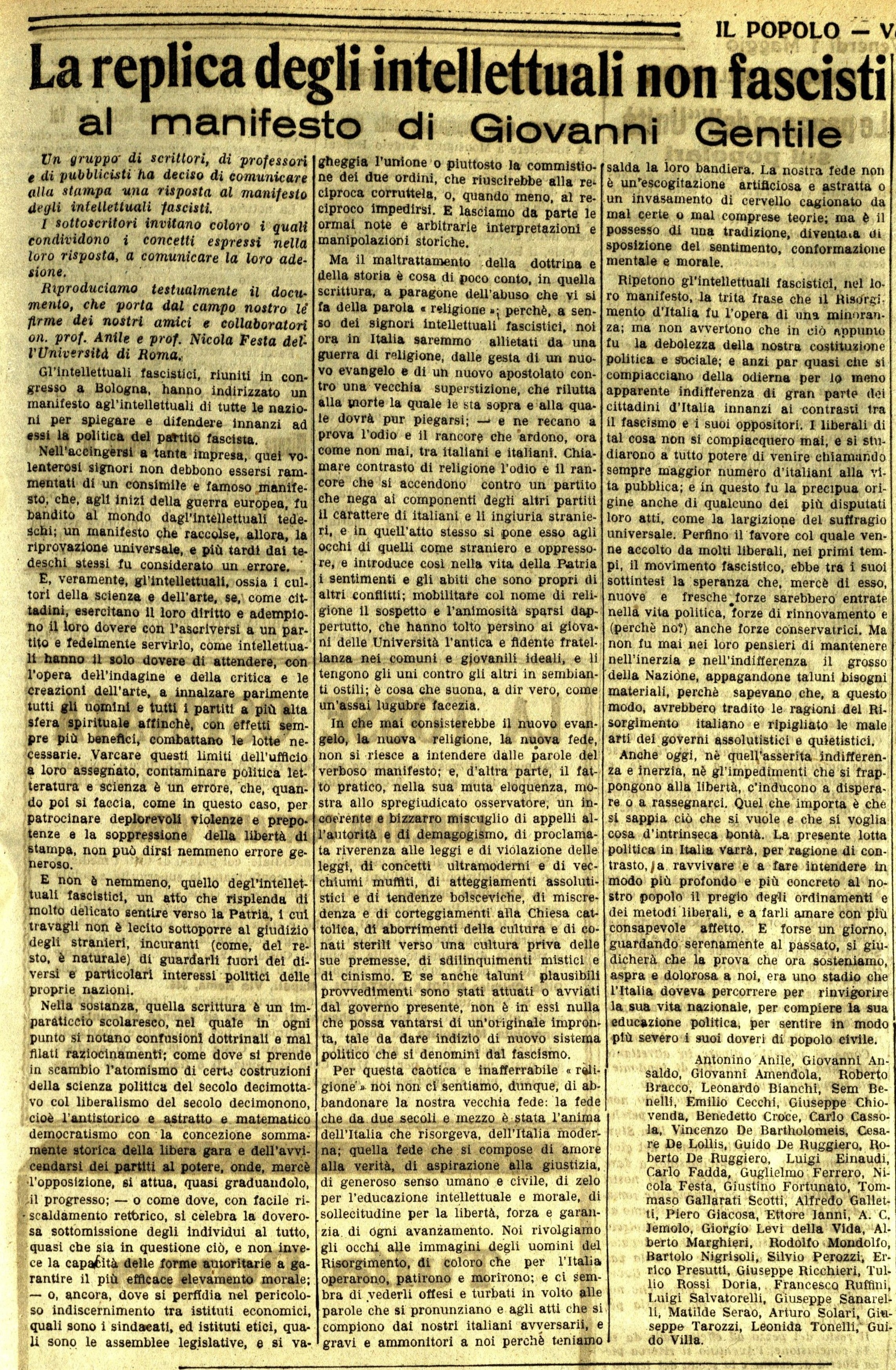
- The Manifesto in the 1 May 1925 edition of Il Popolo
- Original title: Manifesto degli intellettuali antifascisti
- Presented: May Day 1925
- Superseded: 2025
- Commissioned by: Giovanni Amendola
- Author: Benedetto Croce
- Media type: Open letter
- Supersedes: Manifesto of the Fascist Intellectuals
- Superseded by: A Century Later: A Renewed Open Letter Against the Return of Fascism

The Manifesto of the Anti-Fascist Intellectuals, written by Benedetto Croce in response to the Manifesto of the Fascist Intellectuals by Giovanni Gentile, sanctioned the irreconcilable split between the philosopher and the Fascist government of Benito Mussolini, to which he had previously given a vote of confidence on 31 October 1922. The idea of an anti-Fascist manifesto came to Giovanni Amendola, who wrote to Croce, a proclaimed anti-Fascist, for his opinions on 20 April 1925:

Dear Croce, have you read the Fascist manifesto to foreign intellectuals? ... today, I have met several people who feel that, following the publication of the Fascists' document, we have the right to speak and the duty to respond. What is your opinion? Would you be willing to sign such a document, or even write it yourself?

— Giovanni Amendola

Croce replied a day later, saying that he would be more than willing to, but that the document ought to be short, "so as not to alienate the common folk."

The manifesto was published by the liberal newspaper Il Mondo and by the Catholic newspaper Il Popolo on 1 May 1925, which was Workers' Day, symbolically responding to the publication of the Fascist manifesto on the Natale di Roma, the founding of Rome (celebrated on 21 April). The Fascist press claimed that the Crocian manifesto was "more authoritarian" than its Fascist counterpart.

The Manifesto was signed in total by hundreds of intellectuals, of whose signatures only 270 were published, divided into 3 lists published by Il Mondo, and a few other newspapers, on Friday, May 1, Sunday, May 10, and Friday, May 22, 1925, respectively.

Il Mondo published three lists of prominent signatories of the manifesto, first on 1 May and then longer lists on 10 May and 22 May. Among the supporters were:

- Luigi Albertini
- Sibilla Aleramo
- Giulio Alessio
- Corrado Alvaro
- Giovanni Amendola
- Giovanni Ansaldo
- Vincenzo Arangio-Ruiz
- Antonio Banfi
- Sem Benelli
- Costantino Bresciani Turroni
- Piero Calamandrei
- Guido Castelnuovo
- Emilio Cecchi
- Cesare de Lollis
- Floriano del Secolo
- Guido de Ruggiero
- Gaetano de Sanctis
- Francesco de Sarlo
- Luigi Einaudi
- Giorgio Errera
- Giustino Fortunato
- Eustachio Paolo Lamanna
- Beppo Levi
- Giorgio Levi della Vida
- Tullio Levi-Civita
- Carlo Linati
- Attilio Momigliano
- Rodolfo Mondolfo
- Eugenio Montale
- Marino Moretti
- Gaetano Mosca
- Ugo Enrico Paoli
- Giorgio Pasquali
- Giuseppe Rensi
- Francesco Ruffini
- Gaetano Salvemini
- Michele Saponaro
- Matilde Serao
- Adriano Tilgher
- Umberto Zanotti Bianco

== Translation ==
The fascist intellectuals, gathered in congress in Bologna, have addressed a manifesto to the intellectuals of all nations to explain and defend before them the policy of the fascist party.

In undertaking such an undertaking, those eager gentlemen must not have remembered a similar famous manifesto, which, at the beginning of the European war, was proclaimed to the world by the German intellectuals; a manifesto which at the time received universal disapproval, and later was considered a mistake by the Germans themselves.

And, truly, intellectuals, that is, devotees of science and art, if, as citizens, they exercise their right and fulfill their duty by joining a party and faithfully serving it, as intellectuals have the sole duty to attend, with the work of investigation and criticism and the creations of art, to equally raise all men and all parties to a higher spiritual sphere so that with ever more beneficial effects, they fight the necessary battles.

To cross these limits of the office assigned to them, to contaminate politics and literature, politics and science is a mistake, which, when then it is done, as in this case, to sponsor deplorable violence and bullying and the suppression of freedom of the press, cannot even be called a generous mistake.

Nor is it, that of the fascist intellectuals, an act that shines with a very delicate feeling towards the homeland, whose troubles it is not permissible to submit to the judgment of foreigners, careless (as, moreover, is natural) of looking at them outside the different and particular political interests of their own nations.

In substance, that writing is a schoolboy's lesson, in which at every point one notices doctrinal confusions and ill-constructed reasoning; as where the atomism of certain constructions of the political science of the eighteenth century is exchanged for the democratic liberalism of the nineteenth century, that is, the anti-historical and abstract and mathematical democracy, with the supremely historical conception of the free competition and the alternation of the parties in power, whereby, thanks to the opposition, progress is brought about almost by gradation; or where, with easy rhetorical heating, the dutiful submission of individuals to the whole is celebrated, almost as if this were the issue, and not instead the capacity of authoritarian forms to guarantee the most effective moral elevation; or, again, where one is perfidious in the dangerous indiscernment between economic institutions, such as trade unions, and ethical institutions, such as legislative assemblies, and one dreams of the union or rather the mixing of the two orders, which would succeed in their mutual corruption, or at least, in their mutual impediment.

And let us leave aside the now well-known and arbitrary historical interpretations and manipulations. But the mistreatment of doctrines and history is a trivial matter, in that writing, compared to the abuse that is made of the word "religion"; because, in the opinion of the gentlemen fascist intellectuals, we in Italy would now be cheered by a war of religion, by the deeds of a new gospel and a new apostolate against an old superstition, which is reluctant to die, which is above it and to which it will have to resign itself; and they bear proof of this in the hatred and rancor that burn, now as never before, between Italians and Italians.

To call a conflict of religion the hatred and rancor that are kindled against a party that denies the members of other parties the character of Italians and insults them as foreigners, and in that very act places itself in the eyes of those as a foreigner and an oppressor, and thus introduces into the life of the Fatherland the feelings and habits that are typical of other conflicts; to ennoble with the name of religion the suspicion and animosity spread everywhere, which have taken away even from the young people of the universities the ancient and trusting brotherhood in common and youthful ideals, and keep them against each other in hostile faces; is something that sounds, to tell the truth, like a very lugubrious joke.

What the new gospel, the new religion, the new faith would consist of, one cannot understand from the words of the verbose manifesto; and, on the other hand, the practical fact, in its silent eloquence, shows to the unprejudiced observer an incoherent and bizarre mixture of appeals to authority and demagogy, of proclaimed reverence for the laws and violations of the laws, of ultramodern concepts and musty old things, of absolutist attitudes and Bolshevik tendencies, of disbelief and courtship of the Catholic Church, of abhorrences of culture and sterile attempts at a culture deprived of its premises, of mystical fawning and cynicism.

And even if some plausible measures have been implemented or initiated by the present government, there is nothing in them that can boast of an original imprint, such as to give an indication of a new political system that takes its name from fascism.

For this chaotic and elusive "religion" we do not feel like abandoning our old faith: the faith that for two and a half centuries has been the soul of the Italy that was reborn, of modern Italy; that faith that was composed of love for truth, of aspiration for justice, of generous human and civil sense, of zeal for intellectual and moral education, of concern for freedom, strength and guarantee of every advancement.

We turn our eyes to the images of the men of the Risorgimento, of those who worked, suffered and died for Italy; and we seem to see them offended and troubled in their faces at the words that are uttered and the actions that are carried out by our adversaries, and grave and warning to us because we hold fast to their flag.

Our faith is not an artificial and abstract contrivance or a brain invasion caused by ill-defined or poorly understood theories; but it is the possession of a tradition, become a disposition of feeling, mental or moral conformation.

The fascist intellectuals repeat, in their manifesto, the trite phrase that the Risorgimento of Italy was the work of a minority; but they do not realize that in this precisely was the weakness of our political and social constitution; and indeed it almost seems that they are pleased with the present at least apparent indifference of a large part of the citizens of Italy in the face of the contrasts between fascism and its opponents.

The liberals were never pleased with this, and they tried with all their might to call ever greater numbers of Italians to public life; and this was the main origin of some of their most disputed acts, such as the granting of universal suffrage.

Even the favor with which the fascist movement was welcomed by many liberals in the early days had among its implications the hope that, thanks to it, new and fresh forces would enter political life, forces of renewal and (why not?) also conservative forces.

But it was never in their thoughts to keep the bulk of the nation in inertia and indifference, supporting some of its material needs, because they knew that, in this way, they would have betrayed the reasons of the Italian Risorgimento and resumed the evil arts of absolutist or querent governments.

Even today, neither that alleged indifference and inertia, nor the failures that stand in the way of freedom, lead us to despair or to resign ourselves.

What matters is that we know what we want and that we want something of intrinsic goodness. The present political struggle in Italy will serve, for reasons of contrast, to revive and make our people understand in a deeper and more concrete way the value of liberal systems and methods, and to make them love with more conscious affection.

And perhaps one day, looking serenely at the past, it will be judged that the test we are now enduring, harsh and painful to us, was a stage that Italy had to go through to rejuvenate its national life, to complete its political education, to feel more severely its duties as a civilized people.

— Benedetto Croce

== Legacy ==
One hundred years after the publication of the original manifesto, on May 1, 2025 the collective Il Manifesto di Londra launched a new manifesto in the form of an open letter motivated by the desire to stop the return of fascism, with a specific concern relating to the Donald Trump's presidency. Between May 1 and June 14 the new letter gathered the support of over 400 intellectuals from more than 30 countries, including 31 Nobel Prize laureates, 11 winners of the Johan Skytte Prize in Political Science, and other prominent historians, philosophers, political scientists and experts on fascism and democracy. Notable signatories include Ruth Ben-Ghiat, Seyla Benhabib, John S. Dryzek, Steven Friedman, John Keane, Claudia Koonz, Steven Levitsky, Arend Lijphart, Nancy MacLean, Jane Mansbridge, Achille Mbembe, Pippa Norris, Timothy Snyder, Jason Stanley, Nadia Urbinati.

As in 1925, the renewed letter against fascism was published simultaneously across multiple news outlets—this time translated into French, English, Italian, Portuguese, Spanish, German, and Turkish—starting at 12:00 UTC on June 13, 2025, in order to enable print publication on June 14 across all time zones. The date of June 14 was chosen to coincide with Donald Trump's 79th birthday. Following its publication, the letter was opened to public signatures, reaching approximately 8,000 signatories in the first month.

== See also ==
- Liberal anti-fascism
- Manifesto of the Fascist Intellectuals
