= Dino Formaggio =

Italian philosopher, art critic, and academic

Education
- Academic advisor: Antonio Banfi

Philosophical work
- School: School of Milan
- Notable students: Massimo Cacciari; Giangiorgio Pasqualotto
- Main interests: Phenomenology
- Notable works: Fenomenologia della tecnica artistica (1953)
- Notable ideas: phenomenology of art

Dino Formaggio (28 July 1914 in Milan – 6 December 2008 in Illasi) was an Italian philosopher, art critic, and academic. He is part of the Italian phenomenological school or the School of Milan and is noted for his development of an organic description of the experiential complexity where art is phenomenologically constituted.

== Biography ==
Born in Milan in 1914, he began working in a factory at a very young age when, at the age of twelve, he found employment at Brown Boveri in Milan. But soon his nature brought to study, supported by a lively intelligence, spurred him to enroll in evening schools. This experience, which united study to work, hard but also formative (in the meantime he had changed jobs, moving to Orologerie Binda to have more free time to devote to study), increasingly sharpened his sensitivity towards social problems, which will constitute later, even when he became high school professor at Manzoni in Milan and then in charge of Aesthetics at the University of Pavia, the main subject of his cultural path, both philosophical and human.

Having obtained his primary school teacher diploma in 1933, he was transferred to Motta Visconti, in the same institute where the poet Ada Negri had taught a few years earlier. While teaching, he continued his studies by enrolling at the State University of Milan, where he graduated in 1938, supervisor Professor Antonio Banfi, discussing a thesis entitled Phenomenology of art, relationship between art and technique in contemporary European aesthetics, futuristic for those times, centered as it was on the theme of artistic technique. He was linked by an intense friendship with the poet Antonia Pozzi.

In the early post-war years, after having actively participated in the partisan struggle, Dino Formaggio joined the University of Milan as an assistant to the chair of Aesthetics. He also collaborated with the journal Philosophical Studies and published some essays, such as Phenomenology of Art Technique, resuming and expanding his degree thesis. By virtue of this publication, he was awarded the post of the chair of Aesthetics of Pavia.

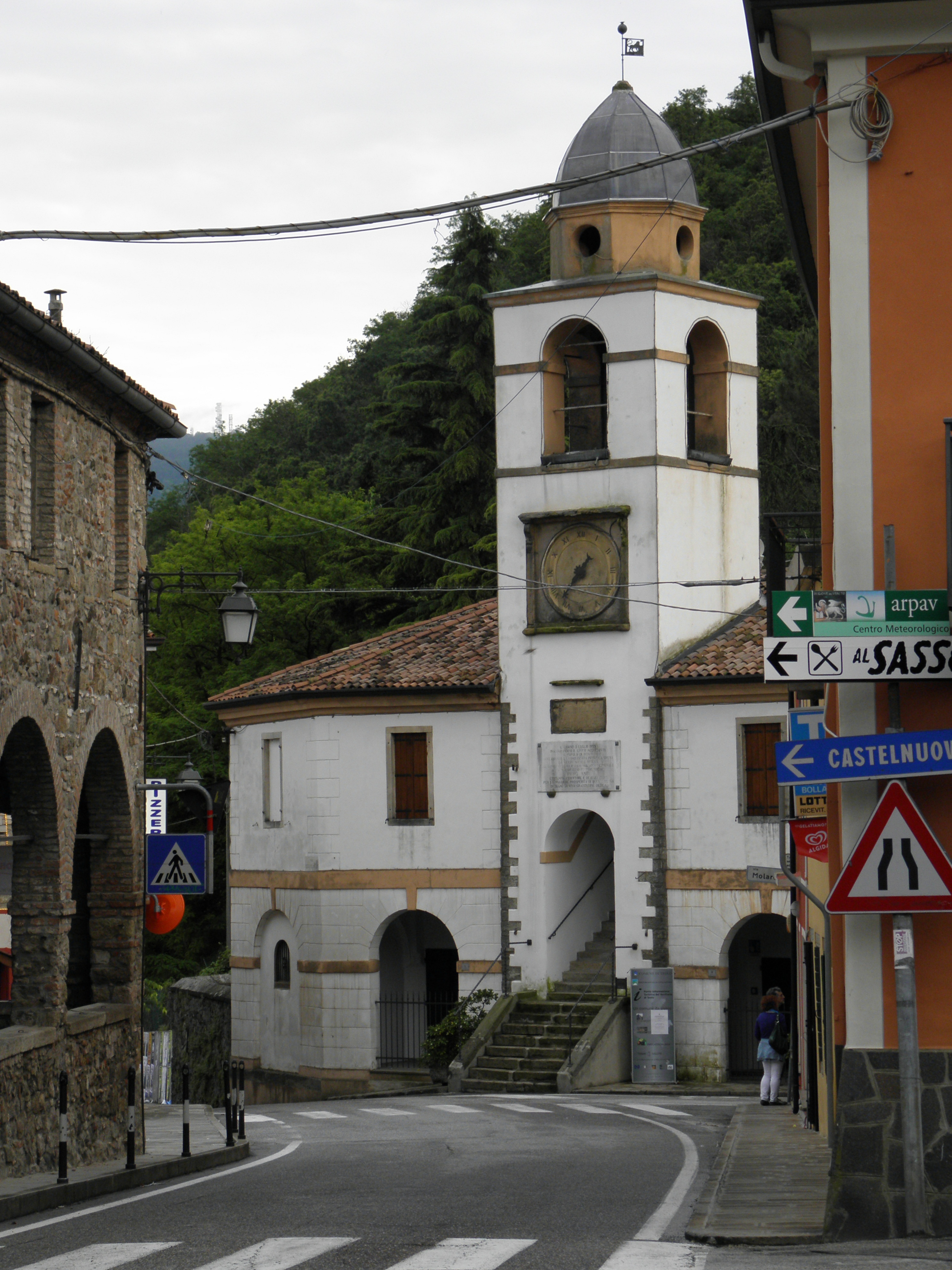
The Dino Formaggio Museum of Contemporary Art at Teolo, Italy.

Formaggio moved to Veneto in 1963, after having won the competition for the chair as Full Professor of Aesthetics at the University of Padua, between 1966 and 1978, a very difficult period for the whole Italian academic world and in particular for that of Padua due to the strong tensions caused by the student revolt first, and then by the nascent armed terrorism, first assuming the position of dean of the Faculty of Education and then that of pro-rector. Among his Paduan pupils were Massimo Cacciari and Giangiorgio Pasqualotto.

From 1979 to 1984 he held the chair of Aesthetics at the University of Milan, of which he was later professor emeritus. Among his students were Massimo Cacciari, Elio Franzini and Pierluigi Panza. In 1995 the students published a book in his honor The Song of Seikilos. Written for Dino Formaggio.

In 1996 he was awarded the Lion d'Or International 1996 prize in the Roman arena of Nîmes for his philosophy publications and his civic engagement. He died in Illasi, in the province of Verona, at the age of ninety-four, in 2008.

The Dino Formaggio Museum of Contemporary Art was dedicated to him in Teolo, a municipality in the province of Padua. It was established in 1993 through donations to the institution made thanks to his interest. Its collection includes works by authors of the nineteenth and twentieth centuries such as Dino Lanaro, Aligi Sassu, Medardo Rosso, and Renato Birolli.

== Personal library ==
The Dino Formaggio Book Fund was donated by the heirs to the Philosophy Library of the University of Milan in 2016 and is made up of the substantial philosophical study library (over 2200 volumes) of the thinker. The fund has recently been cataloged and is now available for consultation and in part for loan. All volumes have been associated with the owner, report the status of the copy and indicate the presence of notes, comments, dedications, autograph signatures. The periodicals are being cataloged.

== Works ==
Formaggio's phenomenology emerged out of the twentieth-century Italian phenomenological school attributed to Antonio Banfi, the School of Milan. He is known for his capability to rephrase and rethink phenomenological questions within the framework of philosophical aesthetics. His phenomenological perspective was based on the idea art is not merely the concrete expression of the aesthetic spirit but is also essentially consisted of an activity distinct from what is aesthetic. In his first book called, Fenomenologia della tecnica artistica (1953), he argued that artistic nature is essentially artistic technique. This view included the thinker's proposition of a dynamic art linked to physics, which is applied to the so-called exercises of deformation pursued in art.

=== Publications ===
- Nuova prefazione di Gabriele Scaramuzza. Edizione digitale a cura di Simona Chiodo (1953)
- Piero della Francesca (1957)
- Il Barocco in Italia (1961)
- L'idea di artisticità (1961)
- Arte (1973)
- La morte dell'arte e dell'estetica (1983)
- Van Gogh in cammino (1986)
- I giorni dell'arte (1991)
- Problemi di estetica (1991)
- Separatezza e dominio (1994)
- Filosofi dell'arte del Novecento (1996)
