= Costantino Bresciani Turroni =

Italian economist (1882–1963)

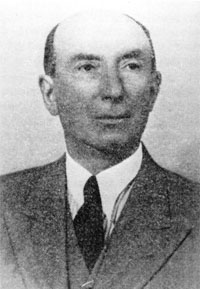
- Born: 26 February 1882; Verona, Kingdom of Italy
- Died: 7 December 1963 (aged 81); Milan, Republic of Italy
- Spouse: Clara Lubrecht (m. 1926)
- Parent(s): Alessandro Bresciani (father); Erminia Turroni (mother)

Academic background
- Education: University of Padova

Academic work
- Discipline: Economics; Political Economy; Statistics; Econometrics
- School or tradition: classical liberalism
- Institutions: University of Berlin; University of Palermo; University of Genoa; University of Bologna; University of Milan; University of Cairo

Costantino Bresciani-Turroni (26 February 1882 – 7 December 1963) was an Italian economist and statistician. He was the last internationally known representative of Italy’s classical school of economics, which flourished in the early part of the century and continued to exert its influence between the world wars.

== Biography ==
Costantino Bresciani-Turroni was born in Verona. He completed humanistic studies in high school and attended the law school at the University of Verona, specializing in statistics and economics.

He moved to Berlin for three years, where he took an active part in the University of Berlin's laboratory of economics. In 1907, obtained a university teaching position in statistics at Pavia, from 1909 taught at Palermo and then, until 1919, in Genoa. In 1925, he taught political economy at Bologna and signed the Anti-Fascist Intellectuals Manifesto. Then he taught in Milan and in 1927 in Cairo. In 1920 the Ministry of Foreign Affairs appointed him a member of the Italian delegation to the Reparation Commission and entered into force on the Dawes Plan in 1924, is financial advisor of the Agent General for the payment of reparations in Berlin. In 1931, he published the essay Le Vicende del Marco tedesco ("The vicissitudes of the German mark"— translated in 1937 as "The Economics of inflation").

In 1933, he resigned from the' Academy of Italy, the former Accademia Nazionale dei Lincei, not to swear allegiance to the Fascist regime. In 1937, he went back to teach at the University of Milan, which he continued to do until 1957. In 1942, his Introduction to economic policy, where he is a fierce critic of state dirigisme, called for the abolition of exchange controls, the return to convertibility of the currency under a fixed exchange rate system, the re-establishment of a market economy and free enterprise as a powerful engine of economic development.

In 1945, he became president of the Bank of Rome, and in the same year, he published the "program of economic and social liberalism" for the Liberal Party. From 1947 to 1951 was the executive director of the International Bank for Reconstruction and Development. From August 1953 to January 1954, he was the Italian Minister of Foreign Trade. He organized the first Law on export credit insurance.

== Research Interests ==
Economics and Statistics

== Education ==
Degree in law, Padua, with a dissertation on Monetary circulation and economic development.

== Academic Positions ==
Professor of Statistics at Universities of Padua, Milan (1909), Palermo (1909–1919), Genova (1919–1925). Professor of Political Economy at Bologna University (1925), Milan and The Cairo University (1927).

== Honours and awards ==
Honorary member of the American Economic Association, member of the Institut de France.

== Known for ==
Pareto laws, Economic Indices

== Publications ==
- Il primo anno di applicazione del piano Dawes, Riforma sociale, (1926)
- Bresciani-Turroni, Constantino (1931). "Le Vicende del Marco Tedesco". Annali di Economia. 7: V–XXIV, 1–596. JSTOR 23233016.
- The Economics Of Inflation: A Study Of Currency Depreciation In Post War Germany 1914-1923. Translated by Sayers, Millicent E. London: George Allen & Unwin. 1937 – via Internet Archive.
- On the Pareto’s Law, Journal of the Royal Statistical Society, (1939);
- The Problem of the Cross-Rates of Exchange, Review of the Economic Conditions in Italy,(1948);
- Osservazioni sulla Teoria del moltiplicatore, Rivista Bancaria, XX,3, (1939);
- Considerazioni sui barometri economici, Giornale degli Economisti e Rivista di Statistica, (1928);
- Sui metodi per la misurazione del deprezzamento di una moneta cartacea, Rivista bancaria, (1923);
- Sul significato logico del coefficiente di correlazione, Giornale degli Economisti e Rivista di Statistica, (1914);
- Osservazioni critiche sul metodo del Wolf per lo studio della distribuzione dei redditi, Giornale degli Economisti e Rivista di Statistica, (1914);
- Sul carattere delle leggi statistiche, Giornale degli Economisti e Rivista di Statistica, (1910);
- Economic Policy for the Thinking Man. Translated by Fitzgerald, Edward. London, Edinburgh and Glasgow: William Hodge and Company Limited. 1950 – via Internet Archive.
- Liberalismo e politica economica, Collezione di Testi e di Studi, Il Mulino, Bologna, (2006).
