= Manifesto of the Fascist Intellectuals =

Italian political manifesto advocating fascism

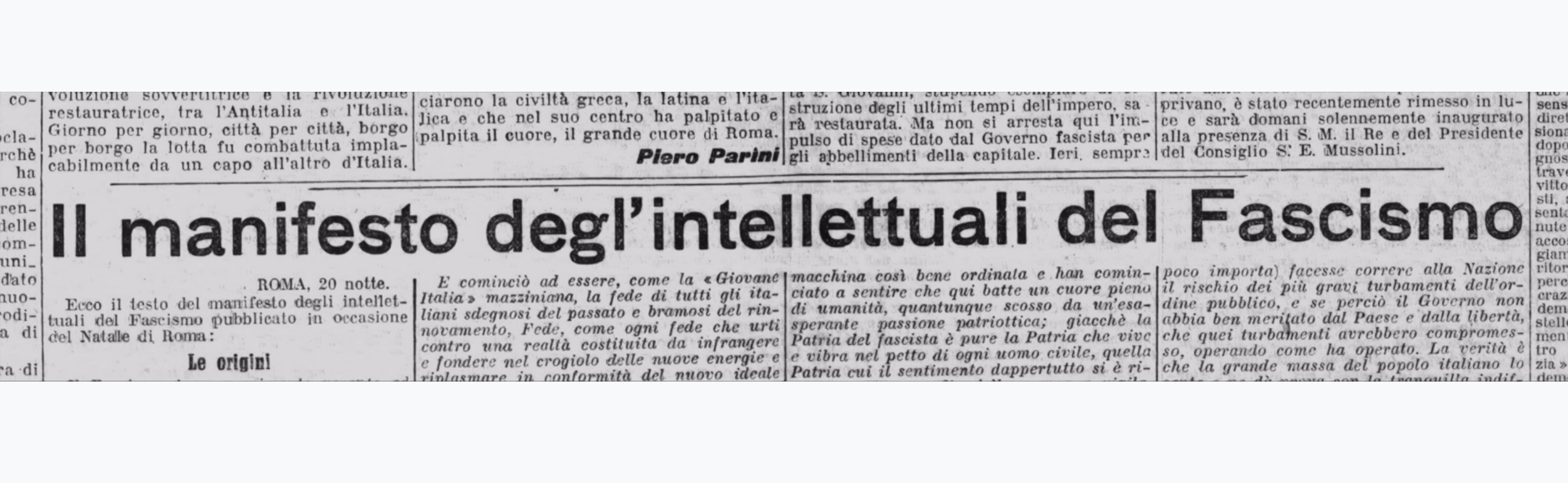
Incipit of the Manifesto

The "Manifesto of Fascist Intellectuals" (Italian: "Manifesto degli Intellettuali del Fascismo", pronounced [maniˈfɛsto deʎʎ intelletˈtwaːli del faʃˈʃizmo; intellettuˈaːli]), by the actualist philosopher Giovanni Gentile in 1925, formally established the political and ideological foundations of Italian Fascism. It justifies the political violence of the Blackshirt paramilitaries of the National Fascist Party (PNF — Partito Nazionale Fascista), in the revolutionary realisation of Italian Fascism as the authoritarian and totalitarian regime of Prime Minister Benito Mussolini, who ruled Italy as Il Duce ("The Leader"), from 1922 to 1943.

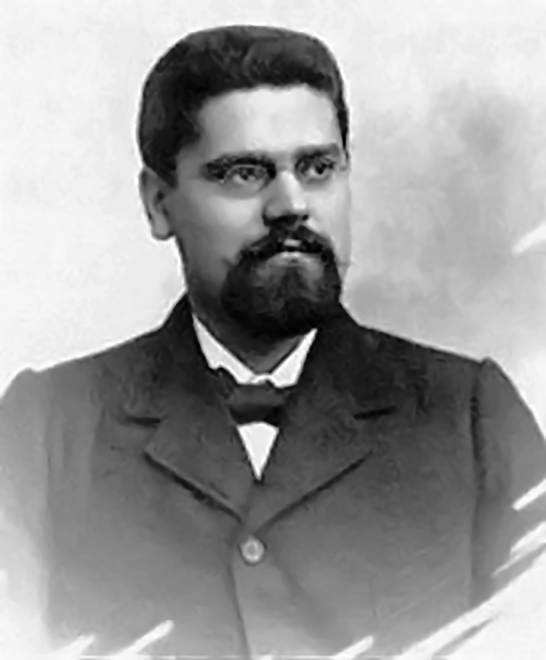
Giovanni Gentile: Philosophical father of Italian Fascism.

== Overview ==
The Manifesto is the ideological précis of the 29 March 1925 Conference of Fascist Culture at Bologna. In support of the government of Benito Mussolini, prominent Italian academic and public intellectuals effected the first formal effort at defining the cultural aspirations of Italian Fascism. As conference Chairman, the Neo-idealist philosopher Gentile publicly proclaimed the alliance between Culture and Fascism, thereby challenging intellectualist critics who questioned the Fascist régime's cultural respectability.

The thesis of the Manifesto of Fascist Intellectuals bases Fascist revolution upon co-operation between Culture and Politics. As a statement of politico-philosophic principles, the Manifesto derived from the "Fascism and Culture" (Fascismo e cultura) lecture Gentile delivered in the "Freedom and Liberalism" (Libertà e liberalismo) session of the cultural conference; although officially attended by more than 400 Italian intellectuals, the document bears only 250 signatures.

The Manifesto was first published in Il Popolo d'Italia (The People of Italy), the PNF newspaper, then by most Italian newspapers on 21 April 1925 — the national, anniversary-day celebration of the Founding of Rome (ca. 21 April 753 BC). The publication date's symbolism was deepened with the contemporary, legal establishment of the celebration of the 21 April Natale di Roma (Birth of Rome), established by Royal decree in early 1925 as a replacement for International Workers' Day.

Many culturally influential Italian public intellectuals signed the Manifesto of the Fascist Intellectuals, among them:

- Luigi Barzini Sr.
- Guelfo Civinini
- Salvatore Di Giacomo
- Luigi Federzoni
- Giovanni Gentile
- Curzio Malaparte
- Filippo Tommaso Marinetti
- Ugo Ojetti
- Alfredo Panzini
- Salvatore Pincherle
- Luigi Pirandello
- Ildebrando Pizzetti
- Vittorio G. Rossi
- Margherita Sarfatti
- Ugo Spirito
- Ardengo Soffici
- Giuseppe Ungaretti

Although not at the Conference of Fascist Culture, the dramaturge and novelist Luigi Pirandello publicly supported the Manifesto of the Fascist Intellectuals with a letter. Meanwhile, the support of Neapolitan poet Di Giacomo provoked Gentile's falling out with Benedetto Croce, his intellectual mentor, who afterwards responded to the Fascist Government's proclamation with his Manifesto of the Anti-Fascist Intellectuals, which was published of the liberal newspaper Il Mondo and the Catholic newspaper Il Popolo.

(in Italian) Manifesto degli Intellettuali del Fascismo
Le origini

Il Fascismo è un movimento recente ed antico dello spirito italiano, intimamente connesso alla storia della Nazione italiana, ma non privo di significato e interesse per tutte le altre.
Le sue origini prossime risalgono al 1919, quando intorno a Benito Mussolini si raccolse un manipolo di uomini reduci dalle trincee e risoluti a combattere energicamente la politica demosocialista allora imperante. La quale della grande guerra, da cui il popolo italiano era uscito vittorioso ma spossato, vedeva soltanto le immediate conseguenze materiali e lasciava disperdere se non lo negava apertamente il valore morale rappresentandola agli italiani da un punto di vista grettamente individualistico e utilitaristico come somma di sacrifici, di cui ognuno per parte sua doveva essere compensato in proporzione del danno sofferto, donde una presuntuosa e minacciosa contrapposizione dei privati allo Stato, un disconoscimento della sua autorità, un abbassamento del prestigio del Re e dell'Esercito, simboli della Nazione soprastanti agli individui e alle categorie particolari dei cittadini e un disfrenarsi delle passioni e degl'istinti inferiori, fomento di disgregazione sociale, di degenerazione morale, di egoistico e incosciente spirito di rivolta a ogni legge e disciplina.
L'individuo contro lo Stato; espressione tipica dell'aspetto politico della corruttela degli anni insofferenti di ogni superiore norma di vita umana che vigorosamente regga e contenga i sentimenti e i pensieri dei singoli.
Il Fascismo pertanto alle sue origini fu un movimento politico e morale. La politica sentì e propugnò come palestra di abnegazione e sacrificio dell'individuo a un'idea in cui l'individuo possa trovare la sua ragione di vita, la sua libertà e ogni suo diritto; idea che è Patria, come ideale che si viene realizzando storicamente senza mai esaurirsi, tradizione storica determinata e individuata di civiltà ma tradizione che nella coscienza del cittadino, lungi dal restare morta memoria del passato, si fa personalità consapevole di un fine da attuare, tradizione perciò e missione.

Il Fascismo e lo Stato

Di qui il carattere religioso del Fascismo.
Questo carattere religioso e perciò intransigente, spiega il metodo di lotta seguito dal Fascismo nei quattro anni dal '19 al '22.
I fascisti erano minoranza, nel Paese e in Parlamento, dove entrarono, piccolo nucleo, con le elezioni del 1921.
Lo Stato costituzionale era perciò, e doveva essere, antifascista, poiché era lo Stato della maggioranza, e il fascismo aveva contro di sé appunto questo Stato che si diceva liberale; ed era liberale, ma del liberalismo agnostico e abdicatorio, che non conosce se non la libertà esteriore.
Lo Stato che è liberale perché si ritiene estraneo alla coscienza del libero cittadino, quasi meccanico sistema di fronte all'attività dei singoli.
Non era perciò, evidentemente, lo Stato vagheggiato dai socialisti, quantunque i rappresentanti dell'ibrido socialismo democratizzante e parlamentaristico, si fossero, anche in Italia, venuti adattando a codesta concezione individualistica della concezione politica.
Ma non era neanche lo Stato, la cui idea aveva potentemente operato nel periodo eroico italiano del nostro Risorgimento, quando lo Stato era sorto dall'opera di ristrette minoranze, forti della forza di una idea alla quale gl'individui si erano in diversi modi piegati e si era fondato col grande programma di fare gli italiani, dopo aver dato loro l'indipendenza e l'unità.
Contro tale Stato il Fascismo si accampò anch'esso con la forza della sua idea la quale, grazie al fascino che esercita sempre ogni idea religiosa che inviti al sacrificio, attrasse intorno a sé un numero rapidamente crescente di giovani e fu il partito dei giovani (come dopo i moti del '31 da analogo bisogno politico e morale era sorta la "Giovane Italia" di Giuseppe Mazzini).
Questo partito ebbe anche il suo inno della giovinezza che venne cantato dai fascisti con gioia di cuore esultante!
E cominciò a essere, come la "Giovane Italia" mazziniana, la fede di tutti gli Italiani sdegnosi del passato e bramosi del rinnovamento.
Fede, come ogni fede che urti contro una realtà costituita da infrangere e fondere nel crogiolo delle nuove energie e riplasmare in conformità del nuovo ideale ardente e intransigente.
Era la fede stessa maturatasi nelle trincee e nel ripensamento intenso del sacrificio consumatosi nei campi di battaglia pel solo fine che potesse giustificarlo: la vita e la grandezza della Patria.
Fede energica, violenta, non disposta a nulla rispettare che opponesse alla vita, alla grandezza della Patria.
Sorse così lo squadrismo. Giovani risoluti, armati, indossanti la camicia nera, ordinati militarmente, si misero contro la legge per instaurare una nuova legge, forza armata contro lo Stato per fondare il nuovo Stato.
Lo squadrismo agì contro le forze disgregatrici antinazionali, la cui attività culminò nello sciopero generale del luglio 1922 e finalmente osò l'insurrezione del 28 ottobre 1922, quando colonne armate di fascisti, dopo avere occupato gli edifici pubblici delle province, marciarono su Roma.
La Marcia su Roma, nei giorni in cui fu compiuta e prima, ebbe i suoi morti, soprattutto nella Valle Padana. Essa, come in tutti i fatti audaci di alto contenuto morale, si compì dapprima fra la meraviglia e poi l'ammirazione e infine il plauso universale.
Onde parve che a un tratto il popolo italiano avesse ritrovato la sua unanimità entusiastica della vigilia della guerra, ma più vibrante per la coscienza della vittoria già riportata e della nuova onda di fede ristoratrice venuta a rianimare la Nazione vittoriosa sulla nuova via faticosa della urgente restaurazione della sue forze finanziarie e morali.
Codesta Patria è pure riconsacrazione delle tradizioni e degli istituti che sono la costanza della civiltà, nel flusso e nella perennità delle tradizioni.
Ed è scintilla di subordinazione di ciò che è particolare ed inferiore a ciò che è universale ed immortale, è rispetto della legge e disciplina, è libertà ma libertà da conquistare attraverso la legge, che si instaura con la rinuncia a tutto ciò che è piccolo arbitrio e velleità irragionevole e dissipatrice.
È concezione austera della vita, è serietà religiosa, che non distingue la teoria dalla pratica, il dire dal fare, e non dipinge ideali magnifici per relegarli fuori di questo mondo, dove intanto si possa continuare a vivere vilmente e miseramente, ma è duro sforzo di idealizzare la vita ed esprimere i propri convincimenti nella stessa azione o con parole che siano esse stesse azioni.

(in English) Manifest of the Fascist Intellectuals to the Intellectuals of Other Nations
The origins

Fascism is a recent yet ancient movement of the Italian spirit. It is intimately connected to the history of the Italian nation, yet it is not devoid of interest or meaning for other nations.
Its immediate origins must be traced back to 1919, when a handful of veterans from the trenches [of World War I] gathered around Benito Mussolini, determined to fight energetically the then-dominant demosocialist (demosocialista [sic]) politics. Democratic socialism was blind to all but one side (that of immediate material consequences) of the Great War from which the Italian people had emerged at the same time weary and victorious. It diminished the moral value of the war, when it did not resort to outright denial, by presenting it to Italians in a crudely individualistic and utilitarian light. It claimed that the conflict had been little more than the combination of individual sacrifices, for which each and every party was to be repaid according to a precise evaluation of its suffering. This claim resulted in an arrogant and threatening juxtaposition of individuals to the State; the neglect of the State's authority; a lowering of the prestige due to the king and the Army—symbols of a nation that transcends individuals and individual social categories—; the unleashing of basic passions and instincts, which bring about social disintegration, moral degeneration, and a self-centered and mindless spirit of rebellion against all forms of discipline and law.
The opposition of individual and State is the typical political expression of a corruption so deep that it cannot accept any higher life principle, because doing so would vigorously inform and contain the individual's feelings and thoughts.
Fascism was, therefore, a political and moral movement at its origins. It understood and championed politics as a training ground for self-denial and self-sacrifice in the name of an idea, one which would provide the individual with his reason for being, his freedom, and all his rights. The idea in question is that of the fatherland. It is an ideal that is a continuous and inexhaustible process of historical actualization. It represents a distinct and singular embodiment of a civilization's traditions which, far from withering as a dead memory of the past, assumes the form of a personality focussed on the end towards which it strives. The fatherland is, thus, a mission.

Fascism and the State

Hence Fascism's religious character.
This uncompromising religiosity explains the fighting tactics adopted by Fascism from 1919 to 1922.
Fascists were a minority, in the country and in Parliament, where a small nucleus of deputies were seated after the 1921 elections.
The constitutional State was, therefore, antifascist and necessarily so, because it reflected its majority. Fascism was opposed precisely by this State that called itself "liberal", yet whose liberalism was of the agnostic and renunciatory kind that only pays heed to outward freedoms.
This state considers itself "liberal" because it is extraneous to the conscience of its free citizens and mechanically reacts to the actions of individuals.
It goes without saying that this was hardly the state that socialists had envisioned. The representatives of such hybrid socialism, smeared in democratic values and parliamentarianism, were coming to terms with this individualistic conception of politics.
Nor was it the State that had fueled the ideals of the small minority operating during the heroic time of our Risorgimento, because those who fought for it were animated by the power of an idea to which individuals had variously submitted. That heroic time founded a State with the grand plan of making Italians, after granting them independence and unity.
This was the State against which Fascism took on, armed with the power of its own vision which, thanks to the appeal that any religious idea inviting to sacrifice exerts, attracted a growing group of young supporters. It became, thus, the party of the young (much as Mazzini's Giovane Italia movement had risen out of the riots of 1831 to fill a similar political and moral void).
The party even had its hymn to youth that the fascists sang with joyful, exuberant hearts!
Fascism became, like Mazzini's Giovane Italia, the faith of all Italians who disdained the past and longed for renewal.
Like other faiths, it confronted a fully actualized reality that must be destroyed and melted into a crucible of new energies, and forged according to a new ardent and uncompromising ideal.
It was the very faith that had ripened in the trenches and in the reflection on the sacrifices that took place on the battlefields for the only worthy goal: the vigour and greatness of the fatherland.
It was an energetic, violent faith, unwilling to respect anything that would stand in the way of the fatherland's vigour and greatness.
This is how squadrism arose.
Determined youths, armed, dressed in black shirts and organized in military fashion, placed themselves against the law in order to institute a new law—fighting the State in order to found the new State.
Squadrism's targeted the apologists for national disintegration, whose actions culminated in the general strike of July 1922, and finally dared to mount an insurrection on 28 October 1922, when armed columns of fascists first occupied public buildings in the provinces, and then marched on Rome.
The march on Rome caused some casualties during its preparation and execution phases, particularly in the Po valley. Like all courageous events inspired by the highest moral goals, it was greeted first by marvel, then by admiration, followed by universal acclaim.
It seemed, for a while, that the Italian people had recovered the enthusiastic unanimity it had felt on the verge of war, but redoubled by the awareness of the nation's recent victory and invigorated by the belief that the victorious Nation was now on the path to recovering its financial and moral integrity.
This fatherland is the rechristening of those traditions and institutions that, amidst the perennial renewal of traditions, remain constant features of civilization.
It is also prompts the subordination of all that is particular and inferior to that which is universal and superior. It is the respect of law and discipline; it is freedom to be conquered through the law by renouncing all that comes from individual choice and irrational, wasteful desires.
This fatherland represents an austere philosophy of life, marked by religious depth; it does not separate theory from practice, saying from doing; and it does not propose magnificent, but utterly unrealistic, ideals that change nothing in the misery of everyday life.
Rather, it is a daunting effort to idealize life and express one's beliefs through action or words that are, themselves, actions.

== See also ==
- Manifesto of the Anti-Fascist Intellectuals
- Fascist Manifesto
- Giovanni Gentile
