= Antonio Banfi =

Italian philosopher and politician

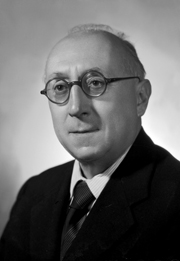
- Born: 11 August 1910; Vimercate, Kingdom of Italy
- Died: 22 July 1957 (aged 70); Milan, Italy

Philosophical work
- Era: 20th-century philosophy
- Region: Western philosophy
- School: Continental philosophy; Critical rationalism; Marxism
- Institutions: University of Milan

Senator of the Republic
- In office 8 May 1948 – 22 July 1957
- Constituency: Lombardy

Antonio Banfi (30 September 1886 – 22 July 1957) was an Italian philosopher and politician. He is also noted for founding the Italian philosophical school called critical rationalism.

Although influenced by the neo-Kantians in Marburg and Edmund Husserl, whom he knew personally, Banfi moved away from idealism and instead focused on Marxism, in particular historical materialism. Banfi joined the Italian Communist Party in 1947. He was elected to the Italian Senate in 1948 and again in 1953.

== Life and career ==
Born in to an intellectual Catholic family with liberal traditions, Banfi spent his youth in Mantua, where his father was rector of the Technical Institute. From 1904 to 1908 he studied literature at the University of Milan, then went to study at the Friedrich Wilhelm University in Berlin on a scholarship. In 1911 he returned to Italy to take up a teaching position.

In 1916, he married Countess Daria Malaguzzi Valeri in a civil ceremony in the Bologna town hall. During the First World War, having already been discharged from military service, he devoted himself to teaching, but due to the shortage of teachers called up to the front, he was forced to take on other roles in addition to his teaching post.

In the early post-war years, Banfi, although not a member of the socialist movement was involved in left-wing politics and participated, as a member of the Chamber of Labor, in the organization of popular culture, quickly becoming one of the most prominent figures in the democratic cultural world of Alessandria. He was also appointed director of the library of Alessandria, from which he was later removed by fascist squads. In 1925, he was among the signatories of the Manifesto of the Anti-Fascist Intellectuals, drafted by Benedetto Croce.

In 1931 Piero Martinetti, who had forcibly been placed on retirement for having refused to swear allegiance to fascism, proposed Banfi as his successor as chair of the University of Milan's History of Philosophy department. Among stude's students were Dino Formaggio and Mario Dal Pra. He directed the magazine Studi filosofici from 1940 to 1949.

By the end of 1941, Banfi had come in to contact with the clandestine Communist Party of Italy and joined the resistance movement. Alongside Eugenio Curiel, Banfi founded Youth Front and the Association of Professors and Assistants which engaged in anti-fascist activities in academia.

After the war, Banfi ran for the Popular Democratic Front as a representative of the Communist Party and was elected a Senator in 1948 and 1953. As Senator, Banfi mostly dealt with educational and cultural policy.

== Works ==
- La filosofia e la vita spirituale, Milano, Isis, 1922.
- Principi di una teoria della ragione, Firenze, la Nuova Italia, 1926.
- Pestalozzi, Firenze, Vallecchi, 1929.
- Vita di Galileo Galilei, Lanciano, R. Carabba, 1930.
- Sommario di storia della pedagogia, Milano, A. Mondadori, 1931.
- I classici della pedagogia: Rousseau, Pestalozzi, Capponi, Gabelli, Gentile, Milano, Mondadori, 1932
- Studi filosofici : rivista trimestrale di filosofia contemporanea, Milano, 1940-1949
- Saggio sul diritto e sullo Stato, Roma, Rivista internazionale di filosofia del diritto, 1935.
- Per un razionalismo critico, Como, Marzorati, 1943.
- Lezioni di estetica raccolte a cura di Maria Antonietta Fraschini e Ida Vergani, Milano, Istit. Edit. Cisalpino, 1945.
- Vita dell'arte, Milano, Minuziano, 1947.
- Galileo Galilei, Milano, Ambrosiana, 1949.
- L'uomo copernicano, Milano, A. Mondadori, 1950.
- (con M. Dal Pra - G. Preti - P. Rossi), La crisi dell'uso dogmatico della ragione, Milano, Bocca, 1953
- La filosofia del settecento, Milano, La Goliardica, 1953.
- La filosofia critica di Kant, Milano, La Goliardica, 1955.
- La filosofia degli ultimi cinquant'anni, Milano, La Goliardica, 1957
- La ricerca della realtà. v. 1, Firenze, Sansoni, 1959
- La ricerca della realtà. v. 2, Firenze, Sansoni, 1959
- Saggi sul marxismo, Roma, Editori Riuniti, 1960 (postumo)
- Filosofia dell'arte (a cura di Dino Formaggio, postumo), Roma, Editori Riuniti, 1962

== Bibliography ==
- Garin, E., "Banfi, Antonio" in Brochert, D. M. (ed.), Encyclopedia of Philosophy, Second Edition, vol. 1 (Thomson Gale, 2006), p. 476.
- Garin, E., History of Italian Philosophy, vol. 2 (Rodopi, 2008), p. 1292.
- Guiat, C., The French and Italian Communist Parties: Comrades and Culture (Frank Cass Publishers, 2003), pp. 144–150.

Italian Senate
Preceded by None	Italian Senator for Lombardy; 1948–1958	Succeeded by Title jointly held
