= Mario Dal Pra =

Italian philosopher (1914–1992)

Mario dal Pra
- Born: April 29, 1914
- Died: 1992
- Occupations: Philosopher, academic

Education
- Academic advisor: Erminio Troilo

Philosophical work
- Notable works: Note sulla logica di Hobbes (1962)

Mario Dal Pra (1914–1992) was an Italian philosopher, academic, and historian. During World War II, he was also a partisan. Dal Pra was noted for developing his concept of praxis into an original philosophical approach called "transcedentalism of praxis". His works also included his investigations of Thomas Hobbes' view on logic.

== Biography ==
Dal Pra was born on April 29, 1914, at Montecchio Maggiore, Italy. He completed a degree in philosophy at the University of Padua under the supervision of Erminio Troilo. He became a professor at 23 when he started teaching at the Liceo Scientifico "P. Paleocapa" di Rovigo. He would later transfer to the Liceo classico di Vicenza until he moved to Milan during World War II. By 1951, he was teaching History of Ancient Philosophy and History of Medieval Philosophy at the State University of Milan. An account cited that he was a libero docente or a teacher who was not part of the regular staff.

Dal Pra would later become the successor Antonio Banfi as chair of the University of Milan's History of Philosophy department. Arrigo Pacchi was among his protégées.

In Milan, Dal Pra joined the resistance group called Justice and Freedom and was known as Colonel Procopio. During the war, Dal Pra earned two war crosses for partisan merit. He was also the editor of the L'Italia Libera. He contributed in the political and cultural reconstruction of Italy after the conflict. He founded the journal, Rivista Di Storia Della Filosofia in 1946.

== Works ==
In Note sulla logica di Hobbes, Dal Pra examined Hobbes' views on logic, tracing his arguments to early modern traditions. This dispelled other scholars' claim that Hobbes' conceptualizations were driven by Italian Aristotelians such as Jacopo Zabarella. Dal Pra is also credited for citing the role of Antonio Banfi's work, particularly his "critical rationalism", in the development of Italian philosophy in the last century.

Dal Pra also became an editor of the Rivista di storia della filosofia, where his work emphasized how the history of philosophy should no longer follow the Hegelian view and should look instead at the link between theory and praxis. In an essay, he also explored the problem of knowledge and conceptualization, concluding that "one of the most important changes introduced in the transition from modern empiricism to contemporary empiricism is the greater affirmation of the initiative of the knowing subject," identifying that this constituted a Kantian instead of Humean model. He also argued that the appropriate approach for historians is that based on the view that unity of the history of philosophy has to be “realized as far as possible” as opposed to the idea that it is guaranteed and established.

Dal Pra also wrote about Italian history, most notably, the wartime period. His works covering this subject included first-hand experiences during his activities as an Italian partisan. His accounts offered insights into critical events in Italy due to his political affiliations, which included his associations with Luigi Longo and Roberto Battaglia. Dal Pra's works also included his account and examination of the corpus of works by Jonsius. In Giovanni Jonsio, he maintained that philosophical works published by scholars in 1650 can still be considered ancient philosophy.

=== Publications ===
- Dal Pra, Mario. (1942). Condillac. Milan: Fratelli Bocca
- (1948). Scotus Eriugena. Milan: Fratelli Bocca
- Dal Pra, Mario. (1948). 'Giovanni Jonsio'. Rivista critica di storia della filosofia.
- Dal Pra, Mario. (1949). Hume. Milan: Fratelli Bocca.
- Dal Pra, Mario. (1963). Dialoghi sulla religione naturale. Bari: Laterza.
- Dal Pra, Mario. (1963). Estratto del 'Trarrato sulla natura umana, con aggiunta la 'Lettera ad un amico in Edimburgo;. Bari: Laterza.
- Dal Pra, Mario. (2009). La guerra partigiana in Italia. Florence: Giunti.
