= Arrigo Pacchi =

Italian historian of philosophy (1933–1989)

- Born: 4 May 1933; Milan, Italy
- Died: 18 January 1989 (aged 55); Milan

Education
- Education: University of Milan

Philosophical work
- Era: 20th century philosophy
- Region: Western philosophy
- Main interests: Modern philosophy

Arrigo Pacchi (4 May 1933 – 18 January 1989) was an Italian historian of philosophy. He graduated in philosophy at the University of Milan with an academic thesis in medieval philosophy. He dedicated his studies in particular to the natural philosophy of Thomas Hobbes and to the influence of Cartesianism in England.

== Life ==
Arrigo Pacchi was born in Milan in 1933. He graduated in philosophy in 1957, at the University of Milan, with a study in Medieval Philosophy under the mentorship of Mario Dal Pra. He studied under Dal Pra with Francesco Corvino and Mariateresa Fumagalli. In 1969 he was called to the academic chair of History of Philosophy as Associate Professor to the Faculty of Humanities at the University of Milan. Four years later, he was named full professor, heading the Second Chair of History of Philosophy. In 1984 he was called to the First Chair of the same discipline after the retirement of Dal Pra. Starting in 1986, he led the Department of Philosophy in his University. In 1987, he was appointed as Director of the centre for the studies of the philosophical thought in 16th and 17th centuries connected to scientific questions, a branch of the Italian National Council for Research (CNR). Pacchi was editor of the journal Il Movimento di Liberazione in Italia from 1957 to 1962, where he published many reviews, some of whom appeared in other languages. He became in 1982 co-director of the Rivista di Storia della Filosofia, the journal for the history of philosophy founded by Mario Dal Pra in 1947. Pacchi died in January 1989 in Milan. He was 55 years of age.

== Work ==
Pacchi's first work of research was his academic thesis devoted to the study of John of Jandun. Between 1958 and 1960, Pacchi wrote a number of articles on the French philosopher that appeared on the Rivista Critica di Storia della Filosofia, an Italian philosophical journal founded and directed by Mario Dal Pra. Pacchi then directed his intellectual efforts to the study of the history of Modern philosophy, giving special attention to the philosophical personality of Thomas Hobbes. One of the outcomes of his labour in this direction was Convenzione e ipotesi nella formazione della filosofia naturale di Thomas Hobbes. The book appeared in 1965, published by La Nuova Italia. The book gave wide evidence of the philosophical relevance of Hobbes not just in the history of political thought but, moreover, as a keen student of the most relevant tenets of science in his time.

Pacchi in 1971 published a short monograph titled Introduzione a Hobbes. The book gave an account of the intellectual development of Hobbes, from his translation of the Peloponnesian War, to the debates of the last years and the devising of Behemoth. Pacchi subsequently researched the cultural debate in England in the 17th century, with special reference to the influence of René Descartes. At the conclusion of his research into the subject, Pacchi published Cartesio in Inghilterra in 1973. In 1976, he contributed to the collective volume, La Filosofia Moderna, Dal Quattrocento al Seicento, edited by Mario Dal Pra, with four essays. They were dedicated, respectively, to the philosophy of nature in England from Fludd to Harvey, to Hobbes and the political treatises in the 17th century, to the Cambridge Platonic School and the Latitudinarians, and eventually to Locke and the Experimental Philosophy Concurrently, Pacchi devoted his attention to new problems and new authors in the history of philosophy, later publishing the book La Materia, a concise history of the concept of matter, from the beginnings of the notion in Ancient Greece to the redefinition of the meanings of the term in the 19th and 20th centuries.

In 1978, Pacchi edited a collection of excerpts taken from the works of a group of 19th century materialist philosophers. He introduced the texts explaining the choice he made, putting the authors in their historical and cultural context. There, Pacchi stated how, “notwithstanding their general diffidence to philosophy, the German materialists had two “protective deities”, Schopenhauer and Feuerbach, whom they often refer to, although they quite never understood them completely. You can wonder of the connection, but your surprise will be short lived, if you ponder the fact that these two thinkers voiced, from different perspectives, the quickest and the most intransigent anti-idealist reaction in Germany in the second quarter of XIX century”.

In 1979, Pacchi wrote an essay on Schopenhauer's materialism, as part of a work by various authors on the Legacy of Enlightenment.

In 1983, he published an Introduction to the reading of the Essay on Human Understanding. The book, printed as a didactic tool, was the second work on Locke by the Italian scholar.

From 1981 to 1988, Pacchi returned to the study of the philosophy of Thomas Hobbes. The first evidence of his renewed interest in this subject is a contribution he gave to the International Congress on “Coscienza civile ed esperienza religiosa nell’Europa Moderna”. We can perceive here a shift in the interests of the Italian scholar toward the role of religion on the mature political philosophy of the author of Leviathan. In fact, Pacchi published shortly afterward, a contribution in homage to Mario Dal Pra titled Hobbes e il Dio delle cause. During this time, Pacchi authored several works about Hobbes, including Filosofia e Teologia in Hobbes, Hobbes e la Potenza di Dio, Hobbes e la Teologia, Some Guidelines in Hobbes’ Theology, Hobbes and Biblical Philology in the Service of the State. His work on the philosophy of Hobbes constitute one of the three approaches to the interpretation of the latter's thoughts on religion. Pacchi focused on reconstructing the coherence of a way of thinking based on a genealogy of Hobbes' views, tracing them back to the ancient times and medieval times. In Una Biblioteca Ideale, di Thomas Hobbes: Il MS E2 Dell'archivo di Chatsworth, Pacchi explored Hobbes' perspectives on witchcraft, the immortality of the soul, as well as his treatises on state and religion. Pacchi is also considered the only modern writer who focused on the Epicurean nature of the Short Tract's theory.

His last work, a set of introductory notes to each chapter of a new Italian translation of Leviathan, was brought abruptly to an end by his premature death.

=== Methodology ===
The method of research followed by Pacchi in his studies is described by Mario Dal Pra: "His research, from its beginnings, stands out for the attention to the great philosophical doctrines, resorting at the same time to philological methodology. [Pacchi] examined inedited sources and manuscripts, deriving from them new perspectives and new historical connections never considered before". Pacchi applied such a methodological approach to the history of philosophy in his review of Raymond Polin's book that criticized the value of religious faith on Hobbes’ conceptions. In the first place he praises how the French author connects Hobbes’ mechanical conception of nature to his political philosophy. In the same review, Pacchi showed some perplexity as to the “liberal” interpretation of that same philosophy. What Pacchi also insisted upon the need for the historian of philosophy to be “fair” to his sources. Pacchi emphasized the "fair" approach, when describing a logical fault in Polin's conclusions: the French author cites the same sources and the same arguments, but reaches different conclusions.

== Bibliography ==
=== Primary literature (compiled on the basis of the one published by Agostino Lupoli in his "Alcune note di Arrigo Pacchi e Bibliografia dei suoi scritti" in ACME, vol.XLV, II, 1992) ===
- Review of S. MacClintock, Perversity and Error, Studies on the "Averroist" John of Jandun (Bloomington, Indiana Un. Press, 1956), Rivista Critica di Storia della Filosofia, XII (1957), pp. 241–242.
- Review of U. Eco, Il prolema estetico in S. Tommaso (Torino, Ed. di 'Filosofia', 1956), Rivista Critica di Storia della Filosofia, XII (1957), p. 490.
- Note sul Commento al "De Anima" di Giovanni di Jandun:
  - La teoria del senso agente, Rivista Critica di Storia della Filosofia, XIII (1958), pp. 372–383;
  - L'unicità dell'intelletto e l'unità della scienza, Rivista Critica di Storia della Filosofia, XIV (1959), pp. 437–451;
  - La polemica contro il tomismo, ivi, pp. 451–457;
  - La questione della "doppia verità", Rivista Critica di Storia della Filosofia, XV (1960), pp. 354–375.
- Review of I. Vitale, L'armonia prestabilita in Leibniz (Padova, Cedam, 1959), Rivista Critica di Storia della Filosofia, XV (1960), pp. 110–111.
- Review of F. Viscidi, Il problema della musica nella filosofia di Schopenhauer (Padova, Liviana, 1959), Rivista Critica di Storia della Filosofia, XVI (1961), pp. 473–474.
- Bibliografia hobbesiana dal 1840 ad oggi, Rivista Critica di Storia della Filosofia, XVII (1962), pp. 528–547.
- Review of Three Copernican Treatises. The 'Commentariolus' of Copernicus. The 'Letter against Werner'. The 'Narratio Prima' of Rheticus, a c. di E. Rosen (New York, Dover Publ., II ed. 1958), Rivista Critica di Storia della Filosofia, XVII (1962), pp. 217–218.
- Review of D. Formaggio, L'idea di artisticità. Dalla "morte dell'arte" al "rico¬minciamento" dell'estetica filosofica (Milano, Ceschina, 1962), Rivista Critica di Storia della Filosofia, XVII (1962), pp. 231–232.
- Review of Y. Belaval, Leibniz critique de Descartes (Paris, Gallimard, 1960), Rivista Critica di Storia della Filosofia, XVIII (1963), pp. 257–261.
- Il "De motu, loco et tempore" e un inedito hobbesiano, Rivista Critica di Storia della Filosofia, XIX (1964), pp. 159–168.
- Review of S.I. Mintz, The Hunting of Leviathan (Cambridge, Cambridge Un. Press, 1962), Rivista Critica di Storia della Filosofia, XIX (1964), pp. 228–230.
- Review of C.H. Wildon, Leibniz (New York, Dover Publ., 1960), - H.M. Wolff, Leibniz. Allbeseelung un Skepsis (Bern, Francke, 1961), Rivista Critica di Storia della Filosofia, XIX (1964), pp. 237–238.
- Review of P. Costabel, Lebniz et la dynamique. Les textes de 1692 (Paris, Hermann, 1960), Rivista Critica di Storia della Filosofia, XIX (1964), pp. 328–330.
- Review of N.G. Ward, Renaissance Concept of Method (New York, Columbia Un. Press, 1960), Rivista Critica di Storia della Filosofia, XIX (1964), pp. 461–462.
- Review of Aa.Vv., Seventeenth Century Science and the Arts (Princeton, Princeton Un. Press, 1961), Rivista Critica di Storia della Filosofia, XIX (1964), pp. 464–465.
- Convenzione e ipotesi nella formazione della filosofia naturale di Thomas Hobbes, Firenze, La Nuova Italia, 1965, pp. 250.
- (A cura di A.P.) Ruggero Bacone e Roberto Grossatesta in un inedito hobbesiano del 1634, Rivista Critica di Storia della Filosofia, XX (1965), pp. 499–502.
- Review of L. Gysi, Platonism and Cartesianism in the Philosophy of Ralph Cudworth (Bern, Lang, 1962), Rivista Critica di Storia della Filosofia, XX (1965), pp. 103–104.
- Review of C. Cattaneo, Scritti filosofici, a c. di C. Lacaita (Torino, Paravia, 1963), Rivista Critica di Storia della Filosofia, XX (1965), pp. 257–258.
- Cinquant'anni di studi hobbesiani, “Rivista di Filosofia”, LVII (1966), pp. 306–335.
- Una "Biblioteca Ideale" di Thomas Hobbes: il MS E2 dell'Archivio di Chatsworth, ACME - Annali della Facoltà di Lettere e Filosofia dell'Università degli Studi di Milano, XXI (1968), pp. 3–42.
- Studi hobbesiani negli ultimi venticinque anni in Italia, “Cultura e Scuola”, 1968, pp. 118–126.
- Thomas Hobbes, Elementi di legge naturale e politica, pres., trad. e note di A. Pacchi, Firenze, La Nuova Italia, 1968, pp. XII-276 [rist. an. 1985].
- Review of W. Simon, European Positivism in the Nineteenth Century (Ithaca, Cornell Un. Press, 1963), Rivista Critica di Storia della Filosofia, XXIII (1968), pp. 99–101.
- Thomas Hobbes, Logica, libertà e necessità, trad. intr. e note a cura di A. Pacchi, Milano, Principato, 1969, pp. 129.
- Galileo Galilei, Opere, intr. e note a cura di A. Pacchi, Napoli, Fulvio Rossi, 1969, 2 tomi, pp. 608, 562.
- Review of Galileo Reappraised, a c. di C. Golino (Berkeley-Los Ang., Un. of California Press, 1966), Rivista Critica di Storia della Filosofia, XXIV (1969), pp. 110–111.
- Review of A. Pasquinelli, Letture galileiane (Bologna, Il Mulino, 1968), Rivista Critica di Storia della Filosofia, XXIV (1969), p. 111.
- Review of M. Clavelin, La philosophie naturelle de Galilée. Essay sur les origines et la formation de la mécanique classique (Paris, Colin, 1968), Rivista Critica di Storia della Filosofia, XXIV (1969), pp. 462–465.
- Thomas Hobbes, De homine, intr. trad. e note a cura di A. Pacchi, Roma-Bari, Laterza, 1970, pp. 196 [1972; 1984 (intr. parz. rifatta, pp. XL-165)].
- Review of M. Corsi, Introduzione al Leviatano (Napoli, Morano, 1967), Rivista Critica di Storia della Filosofia, XXV (1970), pp. 202–203.
- Henry More cartesiano:
  - Rivista Critica di Storia della Filosofia, XXVI (1971), pp. 3–19;
  - ivi, pp. 115–140.
- Introduzione a Hobbes, Roma-Bari, Laterza, 1971, pp. 197 [seconda ed. con suppl. bibliografico, Roma-Bari, 1979, pp. 201; 1986].
- Cartesio in Inghilterra da More a Boyle, Roma-Bari, Laterza, 1973, pp. XV-272.
- Thomas Hobbes, Il pensiero etico-politico, antologia, scelta, intr. e note di A. Pacchi, trad. di N. Bobbio e A. Pacchi, Firenze, La Nuova Italia, 1973, pp. XLVI-257.
- Robert Boyle e l'autocritica della ragione, Atti del XXIV Congresso Nazionale di Filosofia, vol. II, Roma, Società Filosofica Italiana, 1974, pp. 443–450.
- Introduzione a Thomas Hobbes, Leviatano, trad. M. Vinciguerra, Roma-Bari, Laterza, 1974, tomo I, pp. V-XLIV. 38. La materia, Milano, Isedi, 1976, pp. 166.
- In "Storia della Filosofia", diretta da Mario Dal Pra, vol. VII, Milano, F. Vallardi, 1976:
  - La filosofia inglese da Fludd ad Harvey, cap. 22, pp. 495–504 (890-891);
  - Hobbes e la trattatistica politica, cap. 23, pp. 505–527 (892-895);
  - Platonici di Cambridge e Latitudinari, cap. 30, pp. 675–687 (935-936);
  - La filosofia sperimentale e John Locke, cap. 31, pp. 689–715 (937-942).
- Review of Aa.Vv., Scienza e filosofia scozzese nell'età di Hume, a c. di A. Santucci (Bologna, Il Mulino, 1976) - Review of T. Reid, Ricerca sulla mente umana e altri scritti, a c. di A. Santucci (Torino, UTET, 1975), Rivista Critica di Storia della Filosofia, XXXI (1976), pp. 346–348.
- Hobbes e l'epicureismo, Rivista Critica di Storia della Filosofia, XXXIII (1978), pp. 54–71.
- Aa. Vv., Materialisti dell'Ottocento, scelta, introduzione e indicazioni bibliografiche a cura di A. Pacchi, traduttori vari, Bologna, Il Mulino, 1978, pp. 368.
- Schopenhauer tra Illuminismo e Materialismo, in Aa.Vv., Eredità dell'Illuminismo, a c. di A. Santucci, Bologna, Il Mulino, 1979, pp. 203–230.
- Economia ed etica dei bisogni, in Aa.Vv., La dimensione dell'economico - Filosofi ed economisti a confronto, Atti del 2° Convegno tra studiosi di filosofia morale, a c. di R. Crippa, Padova, Liviana, 1979, pp. 259–267.
- Schopenhauer e il criticismo kantiano, Milano, Opera Universitaria dell'Università degli Studi - Servizio dispense, 1981, pp. 24.
- Il razionalismo del Seicento, [antologia] a c. di A. Pacchi, Torino, Loescher, 1982, pp. 243.
- Scritti galileiani, [scelta, premesse e note] a c. di A. Pacchi, Milano, Opera Universitaria dell'Università degli Studi - Servizio dispense, 1982, pp. 153.
- Introduzione alla lettura del "Saggio sull'intelletto umano" di Locke, Milano, Unicopli, 1983, pp. 221.
- Hobbes e la Bibbia, in Aa.Vv., Coscienza civile ed esperienza religiosa nell'Europa moderna, Atti del Convegno Internazionale di Pavia (1-3 ottobre 1981), a c. di R. Crippa, Brescia, Morceliana, 1983, pp. 327–331.
- Review of R. Polin, Hobbes, Dieu et les hommes (Paris, PUF, 1981), Rivista Critica di Storia della Filosofia, XXXVIII (1983), pp. 233–237.
- Review of M. Sina, Introduzione a Locke (Roma-Bari, Laterza, 1982), Rivista Critica di Storia della Filosofia, XXXVIII (1983), pp. 243–244.
- Review of U. Scarpelli, Thomas Hobbes. Linguaggio e leggi naturali. Il tempo e la pena (Milano, Giuffré, 1981), Rivista Critica di Storia della Filosofia, XXXVIII (1983), pp. 377–378.
- Hobbes e il Dio delle cause, in Aa.Vv., La storia della filosofia come sapere critico. Studi offerti a Mario Dal Pra, Milano, Angeli, 1984, pp. 295–307.
- La collocazione di Alfonso Testa nel movimento filosofico italiano tra Sette e Ottocento, “Archivio storico delle province parmensi”, XXXVI (1984), pp. 183–194.
- Review of P. Clair, Libertinage et incrédules (1665-1715?) (Paris, Ed. du CNRS, 1983), RSF, XXXIX (1984), p. 820.
- Filosofia e teologia in Hobbes, Dispense del Corso di Storia della Filosofia per l'A.A. 1984–85, Milano, Unicopli, 1985, pp. 139.
- Definizioni e problemi della storia della filosofia, Appunti relativi alle lezioni introduttive del corso di Storia della filosofia I, Milano, Unicopli, 1985, pp. 69.
- La vita, la filosofia, e Dino Formaggio, in Aa.Vv., Dino Formaggio e l'estetica, Milano, Unicopli, 1985, pp. 47–49. 63. Review of T. Hobbes, De cive, The Latin version; De cive, The English version. A Critical Edition by H. Warrender (The Clarendon Edition of the Philosophical Works of Thomas Hobbes, voll. 2 e 3, Oxford, Clarendon, 1983), RSF, XL (1985), pp. 609–610 64. Review of W. Anders, A History of Philosophy, vol. I: Antiquity and the Middle Ages; vol. II: The Modern Age to Romanticism; vol. III: From Bolzano to Wittgenstein (Oxford, Oxford Un. Press, 1982–1984), RSF, XL (1985), pp. 824–826.
- Soggetto individuale e genere umano nella riflessione filosofica del Cinquecento, in Aa.Vv., Ragione e 'civilitas' - Figure del vivere associato nella cultura del '500 europeo, Atti del Convegno di Diamante (7-9 November 1984), a c. di D. Bigalli, Milano, Angeli, 1986, pp. 339–343.
- Hobbes e la potenza di Dio, in Aa.Vv., Sopra la volta del mondo. Onnipotenza e potenza assoluta di Dio tra Medioevo e Età Moderna, Atti del Convegno di Studi (Dipartimento di Filosofia dell'Università degli Studi di Milano, 9-10 maggio 1985), a c. di Mariateresa Beonio-Brocchieri Fumagalli, Bergamo, Lubrina, 1986, pp. 79–91.
- Introduzione a J. Stuart Mill, Auguste Comte e il Positivismo, tr. A. Dardanelli, Milano, Unicopli, 1986, pp. V-XV.
- Hobbes and the Passions, “Topoi”, 6 (1987), pp. 111–119.
- Idealismo e naturalismo. La riflessione sulla pace nel pensiero del Cinque e del Seicento, in Aa.Vv., I filosofi e la pace, Atti del V Convegno tra studiosi di filosofia morale, in memoria di Romeo Crippa, a c. di F. Baroncelli e M. Pasini, Genova, EGIC, 1987, pp. 79–104.
- Review of M. Malherbe, Thomas Hobbes ou l'oeuvre de la raison (Paris, Vrin, 1984), RSF, XLII (1987), pp. 371–373.
- In "Grundriss der Geschichte der Philosophie", begründet von F. Ueberweg, völlig neubearbeitete Ausgabe, Die Philosophie des 17. Jahrhunderts, Band 3 (England), hrsg. von J.-P. Schobinger, Basel, Schwabe, 1988, cap. V (Der Cartesianismus):
  - Die Rezeption der cartesischen Philosophie, 12, pp. 293–297;
  - Ein Anhänger und ein Gegner der cartesischen Philosophie, 13, pp. 298–309.
- Hobbes and the Problem of God, in Aa.Vv., Perspectives on Thomas Hobbes, a c. di G.A.J. Rogers e A. Ryan, Oxford, Clarendon, 1988, pp. 171–187
- Hobbes and Biblical Philology in the Service of the State, “Topoi”, 7 (1988), pp. 231–239.
- Introduzione a Thomas Hobbes, Scritti teologici, trad. e note di G. Invernizzi e A. Lupoli, Milano, Angeli, 1988, pp. 7–33.
- Hobbes e la teologia, “Ragioni Critiche”, IV (1988), n. 5–6, pp. 36–41 [testo senza apparato di note della relazione presentata al Convegno Internazionale Hobbes Oggi].
- Il filosofo e l'educatore, in "In onore di Mario Dal Pra", Montecchio Maggiore, 1988, pp. 13–28.
- Présentation di Signes, sens et concept aux XVIe-XVIIe s., Atti delle Deux journées (Paris 10-11 décembre 1986) organizzate dall'ER 75 del CNRS diretto da A. Robinet e dal “Centro di Studi del Pensiero filosofico del Cinquecento e del Seicento” diretto da A. Pacchi, “Revue de sciences philosophiques et theologiques” [fasc. mon.], 72 (1988), pp. 193–194.
- Il suo record, quattro secoli di antipatia, “Il Sole 24 Ore”, 3 aprile 1988, p. 10.
- Thomas Hobbes: un quadricentenario che fa discutere, “Ragioni Critiche”, IV (1988), n. 4, pp. 18–9.
- Thomas Hobbes. L'attualità di un pessimista, [dibattito con F. Barone e F. Viola], “Eco di Locarno”, 4 giugno 1988, pp. 26–27.

=== Secondary literature ===
- Roberto Parenti, Review of Thomas Hobbes, Elementi di legge naturale e politica, edited by Arrigo Pacchi, in "Rivista Critica di Storia della Filosofia", Vol. 23, No. 3 (July–September 1968), p. 361
- Mario Sina, Review of Cartesio in Inghilterra. Da More a Boyle by A. Pacchi, in "Rivista di Filosofia Neo-Scolastica" Vol. 66, No. 1 (January–March 1974), pp. 183–187
- Richard S. Westfall, review of Cartesio in Inghilterra, da More a Boyle, in "Journal of the history of philosophy, vol.13, n.1, January 1975, pp.103-104.
- Review of Introduzione a Hobbes, by Arrigo Pacchi, by Jean Bernhardt, "Revue Philosophique de la France et de l'Étranger", T. 166, No. 4, (OCT.-DÉC. 1976), pp. 480–482
- Alan Gabbey, The English Fortunes of Descartes, Review of Cartesio in Inghilterra, in "The British Journal for the History of Science", Vol. 11, No. 2 (Jul., 1978), pp. 159–164
- A. Babolin, Review of Il razionalismo del Seicento by A. Pacchi, in "Rivista di Filosofia Neo-Scolastica", Vol. 75, No. 2 (aprile-giugno 1983), pp. 350–351
- A. Babolin, Review of Eredità dell'Illuminismo. Studi sulla cultura europea fra Settecento e Ottocento by A. Santucci, in "Rivista di Filosofia Neo-Scolastica", Vol. 76, No. 3 (luglio-September 1984), pp. 503–504
- Karl Schuhmann, Rapidità del pensiero e ascensione al cielo: alcuni motivi ermetici in Hobbes, in "Rivista di Storia della Filosofia" Vol. 40, No. 2 (1985), pp. 203–227
- Andrea Napoli, «Hobbes Oggi»: Cronaca del convegno internazionale di Milano - Locarno, 18-21 MAGGIO 1988 in "Rivista di Storia della Filosofia", Vol. 44, No. 1 (1989), pp. 163–173
- Mario Dal Pra, La Morte di Arrigo Pacchi, in “Rivista di Storia della Filosofia”, vol.44, n.1, 1989, pp. I-IV
- Agostino Lupoli, Arrigo Pacchi studioso di Hobbes, in “Bollettino della Società Filosofica Italiana”, 140, maggio-agosto 1990, pp. 11–22
- Tracy B. Strong, Review of Perspectives on Thomas Hobbes by G. A. J. Rogers, Alan Ryan, in "The British Journal for the History of Science", Vol. 23, No. 3 (Sep., 1990), pp. 353–355
- Agostino Lupoli, Alcune Note di Arrigo Pacchi e Bibliografia dei suoi scritti, in “ACME”, vol. XLV, fascicolo II, Maggio Agosto 1992.
- Mark Goldie, Review of Perspectives on Thomas Hobbes by G. A. J. Rogers, Alan Ryan, in "The English Historical Review", Vol. 107, No. 423 (Apr., 1992), pp. 469–470
- Perez Zagorin, Hobbes's Early Philosophical Development, in "Journal of the History of Ideas", Vol. 54, No. 3 (Jul., 1993), pp. 505–518
- Alan Gabbey, Henry More Lecteur de Descartes: Philosophie Naturelle et Apologétique, in Archives de Philosophie, Vol. 58, No. 3, (July–September 1995), pp. 355–369
- Robert Arp, The "Quinque Viae" of Thomas Hobbes in "History of Philosophy Quarterly", vol. 16, No. 4 (Oct., 1999), pp. 367–394
- Timothy Raylor, Hobbes, Payne, and "A Short Tract on First Principles" in "The Historical Journal" Vol. 44, No. 1 (Mar., 2001), pp. 29–58
- Frank Horstmann, Hobbes on Hypotheses in Natural Philosophy in "The Monist", Vol. 84, No. 4, (October 2001), pp. 487–501
- E. I. Rambaldi, La "Rivista" di Mario Dal Pra, palestra scientifica dei primi allievi, in Annamaria Loche, Maria Luisa Lussu (edited), Saggi di Filosofia e Storia della Filosofia: scritti dedicati a Maria Teresa Marcialis, Milan, 2012, pp. 195–222
