= Academic ranks in Italy =

Academic ranks in Italy are the titles, relative importance and power of professors, researchers, and administrative personnel held in academia.

== Overview ==
Faculty (all these positions are tenured or tenure-track):

- Professore Emerito (full professor after retirement age whose high importance in academic field has been credited by the faculty council and approved by the Ministry of Higher Education: it is just an honorary title, although, in some cases, a Professore Emerito is allowed to keep his/her office for up to two years)
- Professore Ordinario, or more precisely: Professore di I fascia (full professor; tenured position)
- Professore Straordinario (a professor taking his/her three years of testing before being confirmed as full professor)
- Professore Associato, or more precisely: Professore di II fascia (associate professor; tenured position)
- Professore Associato non confermato : Professore di II fascia taking his/her three years of testing before being confirmed as Professore Associato)
- Professore aggregato (a faculty researcher with the appointment for a given course; tenured position)
- Ricercatore confermato (assistant professor or researcher; tenured position, no longer possible to assign after an Italian university reform in 2010)
- Ricercatore non confermato (assistant professor or researcher in tenure-track; a researcher taking his/her three years of testing before being confirmed as researcher; no position of Ricercatore non confermato can be created after an Italian university reform in 2010, but whoever achieved this role before will keep his right to be tenured after the first three years)
- Ricercatore a tempo determinato di tipo A/B (assistant professor of type A or B; a researcher on a three-year contract, type A is a limited-time contract with no possibility to become tenured; type B is similar, but not equivalent, to foreign tenure-tracks as it is the last step before tenure; no new positions of Ricercatore a tempo determinato di tipo A/B can be created from 2025, following a Ministry of University and Research reform approved in 2022)
- Ricercatore tenure-track (assistant professor in tenure track; defined by a 2022 Ministry of University and Research reform)
- Assistente (The former entry level of permanent positions before Ricercatore replaced it in the early 1980s. No position of Assistente were created since then, but some personnel kept the title, though most of them became Ricercatore confermato)

Non-faculty and temporary:

- Professore a contratto (professor with a temporary appointment for a given course or lecture series)
- Professore incaricato (former name, before 1980, for Professore a contratto)
- Assegnista di Ricerca (research fellow with a temporary position, usually holding a Ph.D. title)
- Dottorando di Ricerca (Ph.D. student)

Notice that as of January 2011, some changes have been introduced in the above system, in particular faculties have been abolished in all Italian state universities substituted by larger departments in charge of both teaching and research. Therefore, the role of the "Preside", that used to be the head of the faculty, is now extinguished.

In Italian universities the role of "Professore a contratto" (literally "Contract Professor") is paid at the end of the academic year nearly €3000 for the entire academic year, without salary during the academic year. In 2020 there are 23 thousand Associate Professors and 28 thousand "Professori a contratto" in Italy. Associate Professors have a starting salary of around 55,000 euros per year, Full Professors have a starting salary of about 75,000 euros per year, and Contract Professors of around 3,000 euros per year.

Administrative ranks

- Rettore (rector)
- Prorettore (vice-rector)
- Preside (dean of faculty)
- Presidente di Consiglio di Corso di Laurea (head of a Bachelor/Msc curriculum on a given topic)
- Direttore di Dipartimento (head of department)

== Professorship ==
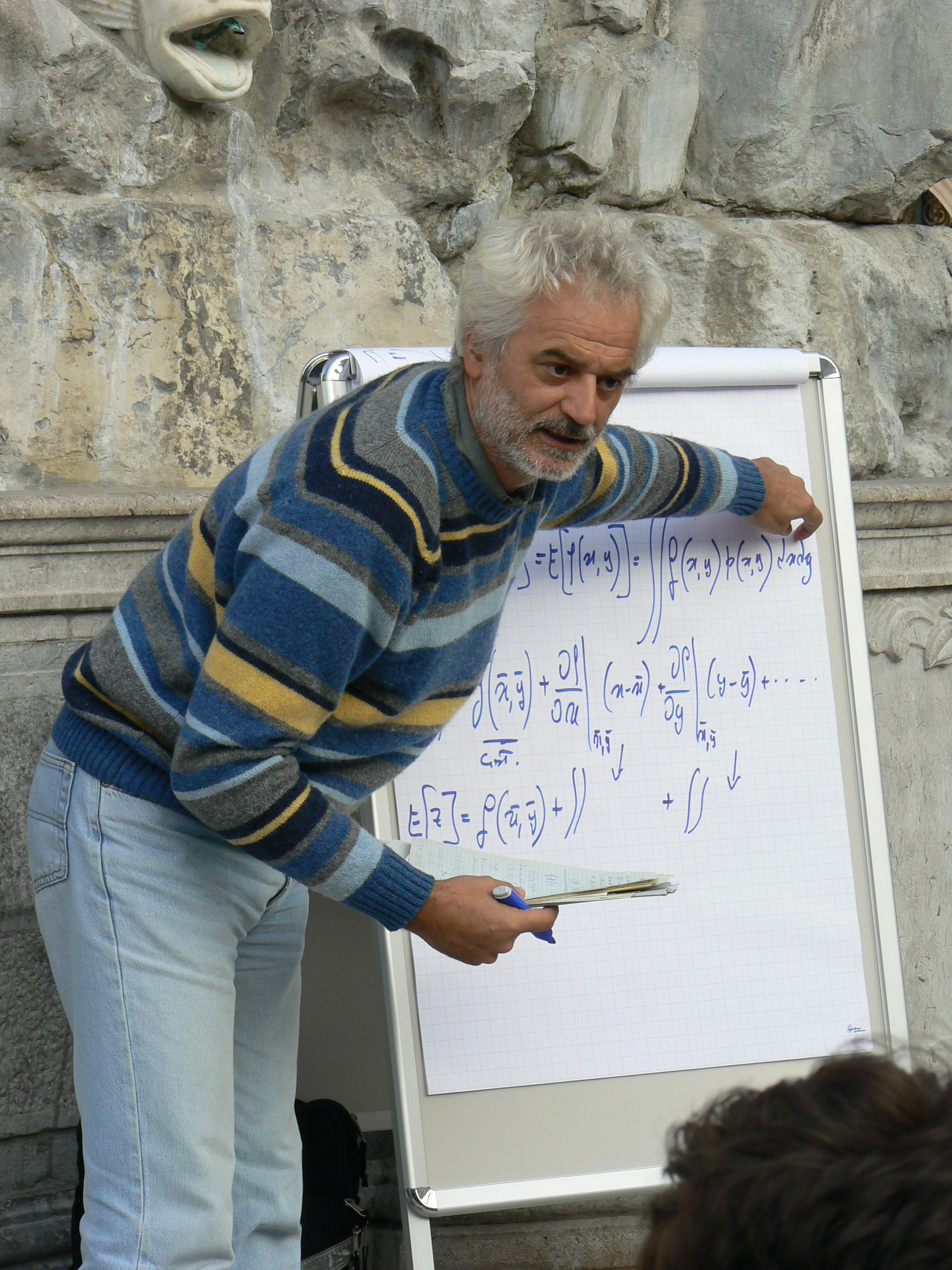
Professor teaching to university students in Trieste, Italy

Faculty members must hold a degree (pre-Bologna process) or a master (after the implementation of the Bologna process). This because pre-Bologna process Italian degrees are equivalent to foreign master degrees. Faculty may hold a PhD (not existent before the Bologna process) and can be (in ascending order):

- Cultore della materia (assistant to a specific professor)
- Researcher
- Professore a contratto (literally "contract professor", usually used to hire persons of great professional experience that lack an academic background)
- Professore associato (associate professor)
- Professore ordinario (the highest degree)
- Professore emerito (high-standing retired professors)
