= Marino Moretti =

Italian poet and author (1885–1979)

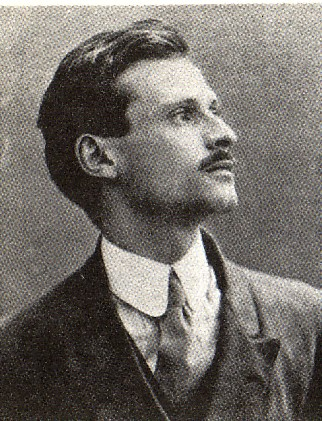
- Born: 18 July 1885; Cesenatico, Kingdom of Italy
- Died: 6 July 1979 (aged 93)
- Occupations: Author; poet

Marino Moretti (18 July 1885 – 6 July 1979) was an Italian poet and author.

Moretti's mother instilled in him a love of literature. After a failed attempt at an acting career, he began writing poetry; his first work being published in 1903. During his career, Moretti wrote twenty novels, eight books of verses, three book-length memoirs, and many short stories. Among his vast poetic production, which surely takes part of the artistic current of the Crepuscolari, the most renowned poem is A Cesena, published in 1910 in a book titled "Poesie scritte col lapis". Among his better-known works are The Voice of God (1920) and Widow of Fioravanti (1971). Moretti's home in Italy has been turned into a museum.

== Works ==
=== Poetry ===
- Il poema di un'armonia, Ducci, Firenze, 1903
- La sorgente della pace, Ducci, Firenze, 1903
- Fraternità, Sandron, Palermo, 1905
- La serenata delle zanzare, Streglio, Torino, 1908
- Poesie scritte col lapis, Ricciardi, Napoli, 1910
- Poesie di tutti i giorni (1910–1911), Ricciardi, Napoli, 1911
- Poemetti di Marino, Tipografia Edizione Nazionale, Roma, 1913
- Il giardino dei frutti, Ricciardi, Napoli, 1916
- Poesie (1905–1915), Treves, Milano, 1919
- L'ultima estate (1965–1968), Arnoldo Mondadori Editore, Milano, 1969
- Tre anni e un giorno (1967–1968), Mondadori, Milano, 1971
- Le poverazze (1968–1972), Mondadori, Milano, 1973
- Diario a due voci, Mondadori, Milano, 1973
- Diario senza le date, Mondadori, Milano, 1974
- Poesie scritte col lapis, Palomar, Bari, 2002

=== Prose ===
- Il paese degli equivoci, novelle, Sandron, Palermo, 1907
- Sentimento, libro per ragazzi, Sandron, Palermo, 1908
- I lestofanti, novelle, Sandron, Palermo, 1909
- Ah, Ah, Ah!, Sandron, Palermo, 1910
- I pesci fuor d'acqua, novelle, Treves, Milano, 1914
- Il sole del sabato, romanzo, Treves, Milano, 1916
- La bandiera alla finestra, novelle, Treves, Milano, 1917
- Guenda, romanzo, Treves, Milano, 1918
- Conoscere il mondo, novelle, Treves, Milano, 1919
- Adamo ed Eva, Milano, 1919
- Personaggi secondari, novelle, Milano, 1920
- Una settimana in Paradiso, novelle, Milano, 1920
- Cinque novelle, novelle, Formiggini, Roma, 1920
- La voce di Dio, romanzo, Milano, 1920
- L'isola dell'amore, romanzo, Milano, 1920
- Né bella né brutta, romanzo, Milano, 1921
- Due fanciulli, romanzo, Milano 1922
- I puri di cuore, romanzo, Milano, 1923
- Mia madre, Treves, Milano, 1923
- Il romanzo della mamma, Treves, Milano, 1924
- La vera grandezza, novelle, Treves, Milano, 1926
- Il segno della croce, Treves, Milano, 1926
- Le capinere, novelle, Mondadori, Milano, 1926
- Le più belle pagine di E. Praga, I. U. Tarchetti e A. Boito, a cura di Marino Moretti, Treves, Milano, 1926
- Allegretto quasi allegro, novelle, Milano, 1927
- Il trono dei poveri, (unico romanzo italiano ambientato nella Repubblica di San Marino)[11], Treves, Milano, 1927
- Il tempo felice. Ricordi d'infanzia e d'altre stagioni, Treves, Milano, 1929
- La casa del Santo sangue, romanzo, Mondadori, Milano, 1930
- Via Laura. Il libro dei sorprendenti vent'anni, Treves, Milano, 1931
- Sorprese del buon Dio, novelle, Mondadori, Milano, 1931
- Guy de Maupassant: Una vita, traduzione di Marino Moretti, Mondadori, Milano, 1931
- Fantasie olandesi, Treves, Milano, 1933
- L'Andreana, romanzo, Mondadori, Milano, 1935
- Parole e musica, Firenze, 1936
- Novelle per Urbino, Urbino, 1937
- Anna degli elefanti, romanzo, Mondadori, Milano, 1937
- Scrivere non è necessario, Mondadori, Milano, 1937
- Pane in desco, Mondadori, Milano, 1939
- La vedova Fioravanti, romanzo, Mondadori, Milano, 1941
- L'odore del pane, Morcelliana, Brescia, 1942
- Cento novelle, Torino, 1942
- I coniugi Allori, romanzo, Mondadori, Milano, 1946
- Il fiocco verde, romanzo, Mondadori, Milano, 1948
- Il pudore, romanzo, Mondadori, Milano, 1950 (rifacimento di Il tempo felice)
- A Panzini: La cicuta, i gigli e le rose, a cura di Marino Moretti, Mondadori, Milano, 1950
- I grilli di Pazzo Pazzi, Milano, 1951
- Il tempo migliore, prose, Milano, 1953
- Uomini soli, novelle, Milano, 1954
- Doctor Mellifluus, romanzo, Milano, 1954
- La camera degli sposi, romanzo, Milano, 1958
- Il libro dei miei amici. Ritratti letterari, Mondadori, Milano, 1960

=== Theatre ===
- Leonardo da Vinci, teatro (with F. Cazzamini Mussi), Baldini e Castoldi, Milano, 1909
- Gli Allighieri, teatro (with F. Cazzamini Mussi), Baldini e Castoldi, Milano, 1910
- Frate sole, Milano, 1911
- L'isola dell'amore, in "Rassegna italiana", aprile-maggio 1924
