= 1958 Italian Senate election in Lombardy =

- May 25, 1958

All 33 Lombard seats to the Italian Senate

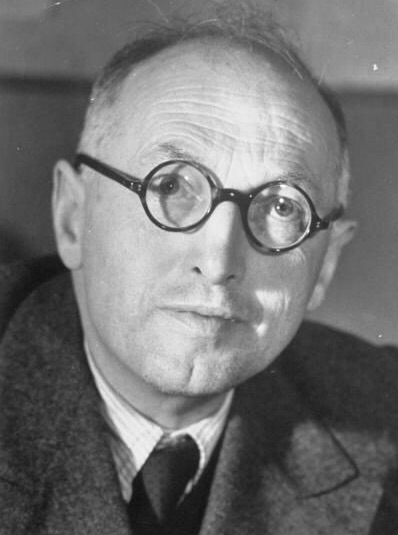

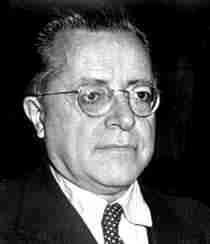
	First party	Second party	Third party
Leader	Amintore Fanfani	Pietro Nenni	Palmiro Togliatti
Party	DC	PSI	PCI
Last election	46.7%, 16 seats	17.4%, 6 seats	18.2%, 6 seats
Seats won	16	7	6
Seat change	=	▲1	=
Popular vote	1,805,779	747,266	746,880
Percentage	44.8%	18.5%	18.5%
Swing	▼1.9%	▲1.1%	▲0.3%
Old local majority before election
DC
New local plurality
DC

Lombardy elected its third delegation to the Italian Senate on May 25, 1958. This election was a part of national Italian general election of 1958 even if, according to the Italian Constitution, every senatorial challenge in each Region is a single and independent race.

Lombardy obtained two more seats to the Senate, following the redistricting subsequent to the 1951 Census.

The election was won by the centrist Christian Democracy, as it happened at national level. All Lombard provinces gave a majority or at least a plurality to the winning party.

== Background ==
Even if Amintore Fanfani's Christian Democracy weakened in this election, Lombardy remained a stronghold for the national leading party.

As it happened five years before, the Communists obtained some seats in the agricultural south, while the Socialists remarked their strength in the Milanese industrial neighbourhood. The centre-left Italian Democratic Socialist Party obtained two seats in Milan, a city led by Democratic Socialist mayor Virgilio Ferrari, while the rightist Italian Social Movement and the Italian Liberal Party obtained some good results in the bourgeois center of Milan.

== Electoral system ==
The electoral system for the Senate was a strange hybrid which established a form of proportional representation into FPTP-like constituencies. A candidate needed a landslide victory of more than 65% of votes to obtain a direct mandate. All constituencies where this result was not reached entered into an at-large calculation based upon the D'Hondt method to distribute the seats between the parties, and candidates with the best percentages of suffrages inside their party list were elected.

== Results ==
Party	votes	votes (%)	seats	swing
Christian Democracy	1,805,779	44.8	16	=
Italian Socialist Party	747,266	18.5	7	▲1
Italian Communist Party	746,880	18.5	6	=
Italian Democratic Socialist Party	248,824	6.2	2	▲1
Italian Liberal Party	184,701	4.6	1	▲1
Italian Social Movement	151,330	3.8	1	=
Others & PNM	147,523	3.6	-	▼1
Total parties	4,032,303	100.0	33	▲2

Sources: Italian Ministry of the Interior

=== Constituencies ===
N°	Constituency	Elected	Party	Votes %	Others
1	Bergamo	Cristoforo Pezzini	Christian Democracy	55.7%	
2	Clusone	Pietro Bellora	Christian Democracy	67.4%	
3	Treviglio	Daniele Turani	Christian Democracy	63.1%	
4	Brescia	Angelo Buizza	Christian Democracy	46.7%	
5	Breno	Angelo Cemmi	Christian Democracy	61.2%	
6	Chiari	Pietro Cenini	Christian Democracy	59.1%	
7	Salò	Francesco Zane	Christian Democracy	53.8%	
8	Como	None elected			Pasquale Valsecchi (DC) 45.9%
9	Lecco	Pietro Amigoni	Christian Democracy	58.1%	
10	Cantù	Lorenzo Spallino; Ugo Bonafini	Christian Democracy; Italian Socialist Party	56.4% 20.9%	
11	Cremona	Bruno Gombi; Emilio Zanoni	Italian Communist Party; Italian Socialist Party	26.2% 21.3%	
12	Crema	Ennio Zelioli	Christian Democracy	52.5%	
13	Mantua	Alceo Negri	Italian Socialist Party	24.4%	Ernesto Zanardi (PCI) 23.7%
14	Ostiglia	Teodosio Aimoni; Unconstitutional result	Italian Communist Party	32.1% 24.8%	Seat ceded to Bonafini
15	Milan 1	Giorgio Bergamasco	Italian Liberal Party	16.5%	
16	Milan 2	Gastone Nencioni	Italian Social Movement	7.4%	
17	Milan 3	Edgardo Savio	Italian Democratic Socialist Party	9.9%	
18	Milan 4	Edgardo Lami Starnuti	Italian Democratic Socialist Party	9.9%	
19	Milan 5	None elected			
20	Milan 6	Piero Montagnani; Giuseppe Roda	Italian Communist Party; Italian Socialist Party	28.6% 23.8%	
21	Abbiategrasso	None elected			Emanuele Samek Lodovici (DC) 44.8% Carlo Arnaudi (PSI) 20.7%
22	Rho	Guido Corbellini; Arialdo Banfi	Christian Democracy; Italian Socialist Party	46.2% 20.9%	
23	Monza	Gianmaria Cornaggia	Christian Democracy	48.9%	
24	Vimercate	Cesare Merzagora	Christian Democracy (Indep.)	54.8%	
25	Lodi	Francesco Scotti	Italian Communist Party	26.3%	
26	Pavia	Pietro Vergani	Italian Communist Party	28.0%	Giuseppe Faravelli (PSDI) 5.1%
27	Voghera	None elected			
28	Vigevano	Carlo Lombardi	Italian Communist Party	36.0%	
29	Sondrio	Attilio Piccioni	Christian Democracy	57.7%	
30	Varese	Noè Pajetta; Antonio Greppi	Christian Democracy; Italian Socialist Party	45.5% 21.5%	
31	Busto Arsizio	Natale Santero; Mario Grampa	Christian Democracy; Italian Socialist Party	47.8% 22.9%	

- Senators with a direct mandate have bold percentages. The electoral system was, in the other cases, a form of proportional representation and not a FPTP race: so candidates winning with a simple plurality could have (and usually had) a candidate (always a Christian democrat) with more votes in their constituency.

=== Substitutions ===
- Enesto Zanardi for Mantua (23.7%) replaced Teodosio Aimoni in 1959. Reason: resignation.
- Emanuele Samek Lodovici for Abbiategrasso (44.8%) replaced Pietro Bellora in 1959. Reason: death.
- Carlo Arnaudi for Abbiategrasso (20.7%) replaced Mario Grampa in 1961. Reason: death.
- Giuseppe Faravelli for Pavia (5.1%) replaced Edgardo Savio in 1961. Reason: death.
- Pasquale Valsecchi for Como (45.9%) replaced Lorenzo Spallino in 1962. Reason: death.
