= 1953 Italian Senate election in Lombardy =

- June 7, 1953

All 31 Lombard seats to the Italian Senate
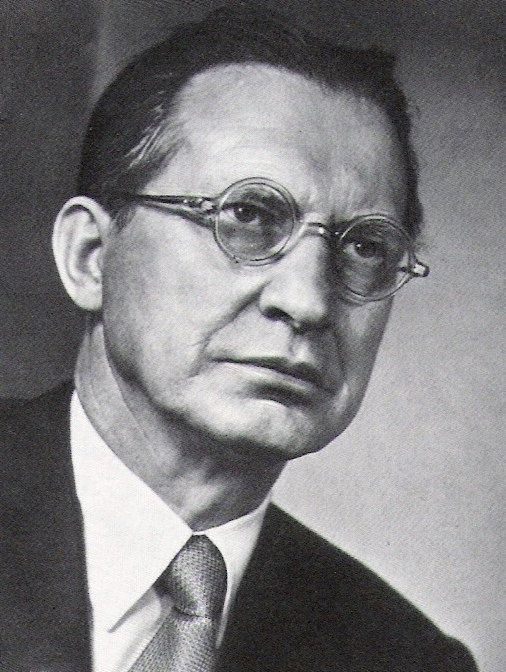

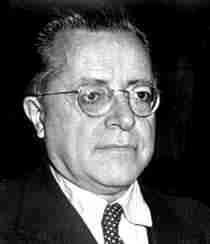

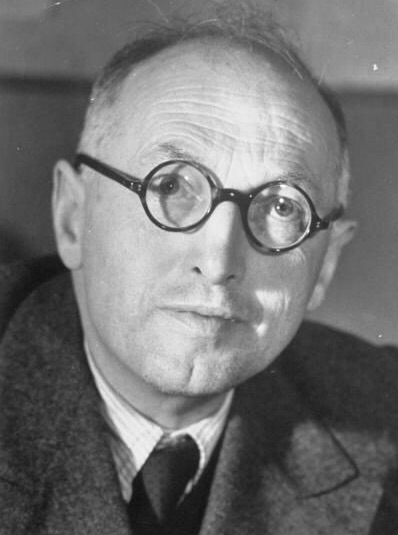
	First party	Second party	Third party
Leader	Alcide De Gasperi	Palmiro Togliatti	Pietro Nenni
Party	DC	PCI	PSI
Last election	53.8%, 18 seats	16.9%, 5 seats as ½ of the FDP	16.9%, 5 seats as ½ the FDP
Seats won	16	6	6
Seat change	▼2	▲1	▲1
Popular vote	1,739,691	678,804	648,787
Percentage	46.7%	18.2%	17.4%
Swing	▼7.1%	▲1.3%	▲0,5%
Old local majority before election
DC
New local majority
DC

Lombardy elected its second delegation to the Italian Senate on June 7, 1953. This election was a part of national Italian general election of 1953 even if, according to the Italian Constitution, every senatorial challenge in each Region is a single and independent race.

The election was won by the centrist Christian Democracy, as it happened at national level. All Lombard provinces gave a majority or at least a plurality to the winning party.

== Background ==
Alcide De Gasperi's Christian Democracy weakened in this election, after that the exceptional conditions of 1948 had expired. However, Lombardy remained a stronghold for the national leading party.

Communists and Socialists obtained more votes running divided than they did together five years before, absorbing most of the Republican electorate. Even if the Communists obtained some seats in the agricultural south, the Socialists remarked their strength in the Milanese industrial neighbourhood. The Italian Democratic Socialist Party obtained a seat in Milan, a city led by its mayor Virgilio Ferrari, while the rightist and anti-constitutional Italian Social Movement and the Monarchist National Party took away some Conservative votes from the Christian Democracy and obtained their first seats in the bourgeois centers of Milan and Como.

== Electoral system ==
The electoral system introduced in 1948 for the newly elected Senate was a strange hybrid which established a form of proportional representation into FPTP-like constituencies. A candidate needed a landslide victory of more than 65% of votes to obtain a direct mandate. All constituencies where this result was not reached entered into an at-large calculation based upon the D'Hondt method to distribute the seats between the parties, and candidates with the best percentages of suffrages inside their party list were elected.

== Results ==
Party	votes	votes (%)	seats	swing
Christian Democracy	1,739,691	46.7	16	▼2
Italian Communist Party	678,804	18.2	6	▲1
Italian Socialist Party	648,787	17.4	6	▲1
Italian Democratic Socialist Party	215,196	5.8	1	=
Italian Social Movement	140,327	3.8	1	▲1
Monarchist National Party	124,905	3.6	1	▲1
Others & PRI	175,418	4.7	-	▼2
Total parties	3,723,128	100.0	31	=

Sources: Italian Ministry of the Interior

=== Constituencies ===
N°	Constituency	Elected	Party	Votes %	Others
1	Bergamo	Cristoforo Pezzini	Christian Democracy	61.8%	
2	Clusone	Pietro Bellora	Christian Democracy	70.7%	
3	Treviglio	Daniele Turani	Christian Democracy	63.4%	
4	Brescia	Angelo Buizza	Christian Democracy	48.6%	
5	Breno	Angelo Cemmi	Christian Democracy	64.1%	
6	Chiari	Pietro Cenini	Christian Democracy	58.6%	
7	Salò	Francesco Zane	Christian Democracy	54.0%	
8	Como	Attilio Terragni	Monarchist National Party	6.8%	Giuseppe Terragni (DC) 46.1%
9	Lecco	Pietro Amigoni	Christian Democracy	58.4%	
10	Cantù	Lorenzo Spallino	Christian Democracy	56.3%	
11	Cremona	Antonio Banfi	Italian Communist Party	25.6%	
12	Crema	Ennio Zelioli	Christian Democracy	52.7%	
13	Mantua	Alceo Negri	Italian Socialist Party	25.2%	Clarenzo Menotti (PCI) 21.2%
14	Ostiglia	Arturo Colombi; Rodolfo Morandi	Italian Communist Party; Italian Socialist Party	29.3% 27.1%	
15	Milan 1	Mario Marina	Italian Social Movement	8.6%	
16	Milan 2	None elected			
17	Milan 3	None elected			
18	Milan 4	Emilio Canevari	Italian Democratic Socialist Party	9.9%	
19	Milan 5	None elected			
20	Milan 6	Piero Montagnani; Francesco Mariani	Italian Communist Party; Italian Socialist Party	31.0% 22.5%	
21	Abbiategrasso	Giorgio Marzola	Italian Socialist Party	21.7%	Emanuele Samek Lodovici (DC) 46.0%
22	Rho	Carlo Corti; Amilcare Locatelli	Christian Democracy; Italian Socialist Party	49.7% 19.7%	
23	Monza	Mario Longoni	Christian Democracy	50.8%	
24	Vimercate	Cesare Merzagora; Giuseppe Roda	Christian Democracy (Indep.); Italian Socialist Party	56.2% 19.2%	
25	Lodi	Gianmaria Cornaggia	Christian Democracy	47.1%	
26	Pavia	Giovanni Farina	Italian Communist Party	26.6%	
27	Voghera	Cesare Gavina	Italian Communist Party	23.9%	Enrico Gazzale (PNM) 6.6%
28	Vigevano	Giuseppe Alberganti	Italian Communist Party	34.1%	
29	Sondrio	Ezio Vanoni	Christian Democracy	62.6%	
30	Varese	None elected			
31	Busto Arsizio	Natale Santero	Christian Democracy	48.2%	Mario Grampa (PSI) 19.1%

- Senators with a direct mandate have bold percentages. The electoral system was, in the other cases, a form of proportional representation and not a FPTP race: so candidates winning with a simple plurality could have (and usually had) a candidate (always a Christian democrat) with more votes in their constituency.

=== Substitutions ===
- Mario Grampa for Busto Arsizio (19.1%) replaced Rodolfo Morandi in 1955. Reason: death.
- Emanuele Samek Lodovici for Abbiategrasso (46.0%) replaced Ezio Vanoni in 1956. Reason: death.
- Giuseppe Terragni for Como (46.1%) replaced Carlo Corti in 1957. Reason: resignation.
- Clarenzo Menotti for Mantua (21.2%) replaced Antonio Banfi in 1957. Reason: death.
- Enrico Gazzale for Voghera (6.6%) replaced Attilio Terragni in 1958. Reason: death.
