= Rosati =

Rosati may refer to:

- Rosati (surname)
- Rosati involution
- Rosati Windows
- Rosati, Missouri
- Rosati-Kain High School
- Wilson Sonsini Goodrich & Rosati
