= Rosati (surname) =

Rosati is an Italian surname.

== Origins ==
The surname Rosati was first found in Italy, where bearers of Rosati were found since the Middle Ages in many areas of Italy, including Venetia, Emilia and the south. The spelling variations on the name which end in "o" are mostly from the south, whereas those that end in "i" are mostly from the north.

== Geographical distribution ==
As of 2014, 72.5% of all known bearers of the surname Rosati were residents of Italy (frequency 1:2,761), 13.1% of the United States (1:90,585), 3.6% of Brazil (1:185,751), 2.4% of Canada (1:50,270), 2.2% of Argentina (1:62,218), 1.5% of Indonesia (1:291,940) and 1.5% of France (1:147,141).

In Italy, the frequency of the surname was higher than national average (1:2,761) in the following regions:

1. Umbria (1:267)
2. Molise (1:639)
3. Lazio (1:718)
4. Marche (1:796)
5. Abruzzo (1:939)
6. Tuscany (1:1,285)

== People ==
- Alberto Rosati (1893–1971), Italian orientalist painter (son of orientalist Giulio)
- Allison Rosati (born 1963), American news anchor
- Antonio Rosati (born 1983), Italian professional footballer
- Carlo Rosati (1876–1929), Italian mathematician
- Carolina Rosati (1826–1905), Italian ballet dancer
- Christine Rosati Randall (born 1969), American politician
- Colette Rosati, American politician
- Connie S. Rosati, American philosopher and Professor of Philosophy
- Dariusz Rosati (born 1946), Polish politician
- Diego Rosati (born 1978), Argentine judoka
- Fabio Rosati, internet entrepreneur
- Gabriel Rosati (born 1966), Italian musician
- Giulio Rosati (1857–1917), Italian orientalist and academic painter
- Giuseppe Rosati (1752–1814), Italian physician, agronomist, philosopher and mathematician
- James Rosati (1911–1988), American sculptor
- Joseph Rosati (1789–1843), bishop
- Larry Rosati (1918–1997), American football coach
- Mariano Rosati (1879–1967), Italian politician
- Mike Rosati (born 1968), hockey player
- Richie Rosati, American recording artist, songwriter, television host, and actor
- Sandro Rosati (born 1958), Italian judoka
- Weronika Rosati (born 1984), Polish actress and model
