= History of Sesto San Giovanni =

History of the municipality of Sesto San Giovanni, Italy

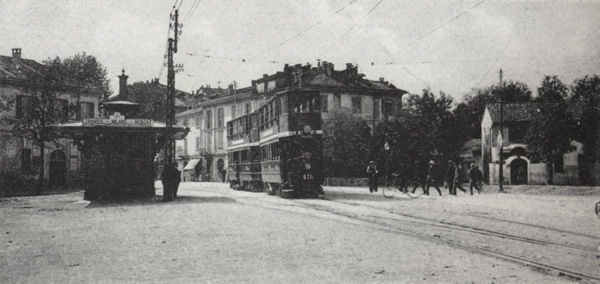
A double-decker tram at the Rondò, early twentieth century.

The history of Sesto San Giovanni spans more than a millennium and, since the early twentieth century, is strongly characterized by the presence on Sesto's territories of some of Italy's largest factories and industries.

The earliest historical records of Sesto date back to the ninth century, when the town was a point of reference for the small neighboring municipalities. Over the centuries Sesto remained a predominantly agricultural town until the second half of the 19th century when the first spinning mills opened. With the second industrial revolution and the beginning of the 20th century, Sesto saw several companies settle in its territory: Breda, Campari, Ercole Marelli, and Falck, among others. The new factories attracted labor, the population increased, and the Sesto labor movement was born, which would make a fundamental contribution to the Resistance to the Nazi-Fascist regime, first with the great strikes of 1943 and 1944, then with the armed and clandestine struggle, until the Liberation.

In the 1960s, the industries of Sesto participated in the economic miracle, however from the late 1970s began the long and inexorable period of crisis for the steel and metallurgical industries that led to the decline of the large factories. Beginning in the 1990s, the so-called tertiarization of Sesto began, with new companies in the sector settling on the same land that once housed the large factories and much of which is being redeveloped.

== From its origins to the 18th century ==
=== The origins of the town ===
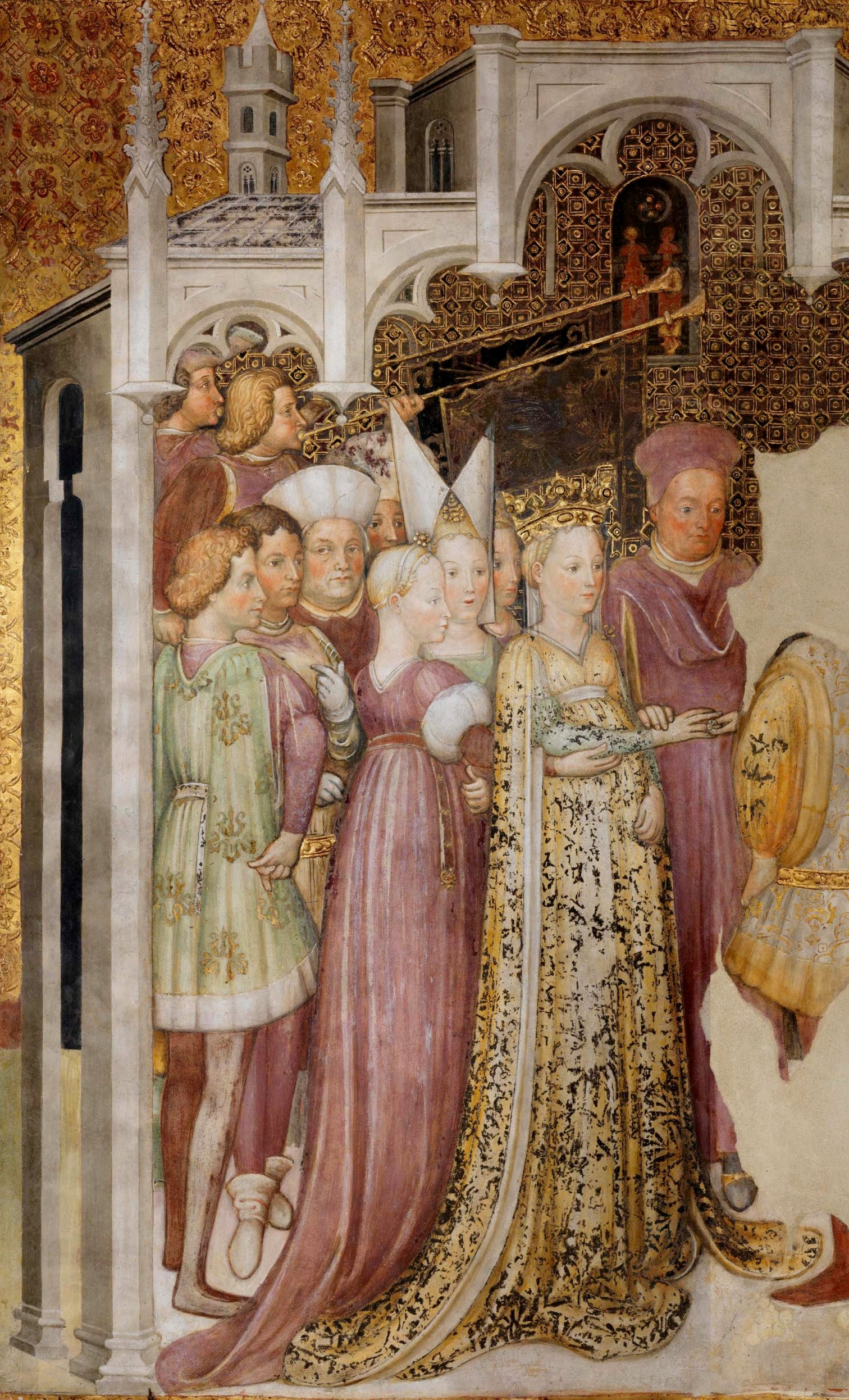
An ancient legend, unsupported by sources, says that Villa Torretta was owned by Queen Theodelinda.

Probably founded as a cluster of peasant houses founded by the Romans, Sesto remained a tiny hamlet until the 19th century. Some sources attribute the founding of the first village to the Lombards, who arrived in Italy between 568 and 569 A.D.; this population was a permanent presence and dominated the territory of Sesto as well: the village of Cassina de' Gatti was originally called Sundro, from the Lombard term sundrium (land maintained and worked by masters on their own account and with the work of servants). The Lombards had ruled in neighboring Modicia at precisely the same time, so they could have expanded that rule to the territories of Sesto as well.

The earliest historical records concerning Sesto, however, date back to the 9th century and testify to the importance of the town to which the then neighboring towns, Cinexellum, Balsamum and Colonia, referred for legal or notarial matters. The fact that even then there were six churches in the territory indicates the importance of Sesto and its vastness of territory and population in relation to the neighboring villages. Around the year 1000 it was "a fortified land" and had a defensive rampart and a rather large castle, which was not an expression of the power of a fiefdom, but rather of the power of some private family.

=== The origins of the name ===
The name Sesto is given by the distance in miles from Milan in the Roman period, ad sextum lapidem, i.e., at the sixth milestone, along an ancient Roman road that started from what would become Porta Nuova, continued along Via Manzoni, reached Greco to arrive in Sesto via the present Riccio and Cavallotti streets, to the center of the village and from there continued to Monza.

The appellation San Giovanni was added only later: the most credited hypothesis is from 1100, when it was written next to the name of the municipality to indicate the dependence of the Sesto territory to the Basilica of San Giovanni in Monza. In fact, from that year Monza exercised the widest jurisdiction over Sesto. However, already a century earlier some documents mention the appellation Giovanni: Sexto qui dicitur Johannis in a document from 1007. Throughout the Middle Ages, the town was known as Sesto Zohanno, Sesto Zane, or more frequently Sesto Johanno, although, until the late 18th century, the town was commonly referred to as Sesto di Monza.

A less credited hypothesis regarding the origins of the name, would make the birth of the name Sesto coincide with that of the appellation San Giovanni. According to this hypothesis, Sesto would not be a toponym derived from the indication of a milestone, but rather would relate to the presence in the territory, already in the early 10th century, of a church dedicated to Saint Stephen, perhaps the present church of Santa Maria Assunta, referred to in the ecclesiastical documents of the time as Sextum Templum Johannis, that is, the sixth of the churches dependent on the Basilica of San Giovanni in Monza.

=== The birth of the municipality of Sesto ===
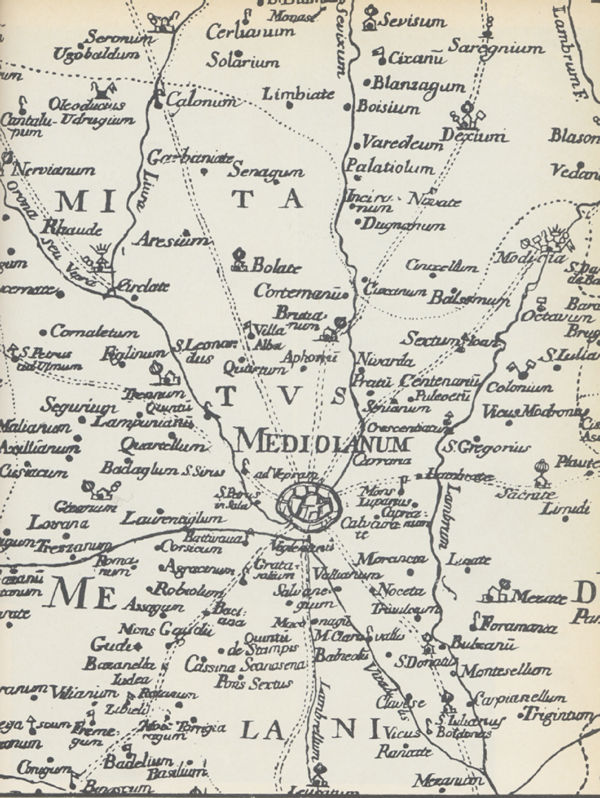
Detail of a map circa 1790, where Sextum is shown.

In the 13th century, the parish church of Sesto was the only one of Ambrosian rite subject to the Basilica of Monza. There was a monastery there dedicated to St. Nicholas that was said to have been founded by Sister Marcellina, sister of St. Ambrose. The earliest evidence of a municipal order can be found in a document dated 1244 included in the "Acts of the Municipality of Milan." In that document Sesto San Giovanni is mentioned as a municipality. In the "Statutes of the Waters and Roads of the County of Milan made in 1346," Sesto San Giovanni turns out to be part of the court of Monza: between the thirteenth and fourteenth centuries such was Monza's dominance over the territories of Sesto that it arrogated to itself the right to elect all the offices of the municipality, promulgate proclamations and inflict punishments, and for these reasons frequent disagreements and disputes arose between the inhabitants of Sesto and the canons of Monza; such disputes, the order of the day throughout the period when Sesto was in the Monza orbit, required in some cases the intervention, to settle matters, of the Archbishop of Milan and even the Pope. Only in the 15th century, under the pontificate of Pius II, was Sesto freed from the Monza jurisdiction, due to the appointment of the first parish priest in Sesto by the Archbishop of Milan.

Sesto was several times involved in armed conflicts: in 1259 Martino della Torre, lord of Milan, gathered his army there to meet Ezzelino III da Romano who was trying to seize the Iron Crown in Monza. On June 11, 1323 it was the camp of King Robert with a strength of 30,000 infantrymen and 8,000 cavalrymen, who clashed with Galeazzo and Marco Visconti. The nearby locality of Bicocca degli Arcimboldi saw the clash between the Visconti and the Torriani and later in 1522 a battle between the imperial army led by Prospero Colonna and the French commanded by Lautrech.

=== The Renaissance ===
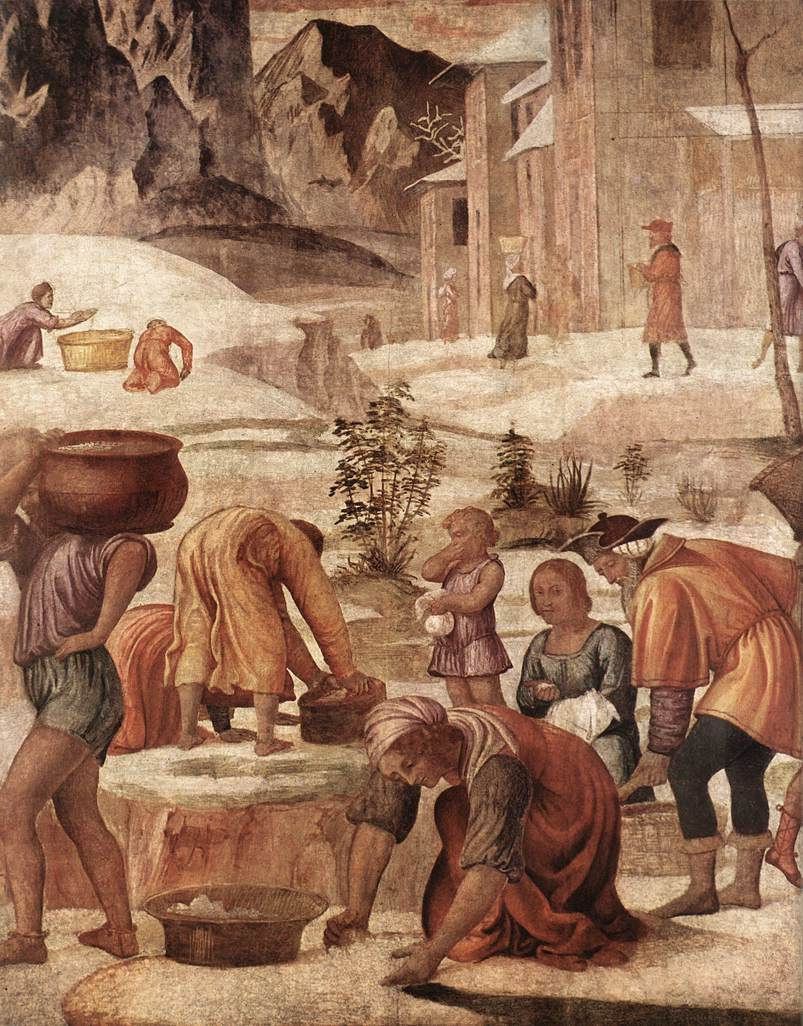
Bernardino Luini's Gathering of the Manna, Villa Pelucca.

In the 16th century Sesto saw the construction or expansion of some of its historic villas - Villa Torretta, Villa Pelucca, and Villa Visconti d'Aragona. The original buildings were for agricultural use, reflecting a markedly rural local economy. During the Renaissance, a number of noble Milanese families decided to purchase land and villas to turn them into ville di delizia, where they could spend holiday periods a short distance from the city, in the quiet of a village whose time was marked by the rhythms of work in the fields. The new villas were frescoed by various artists of the time: Simone Barabino at the Oratorio di Santa Margherita near the Torretta, Agostino Santagostino at the Villa Visconti d'Aragona, and Bernardino Luini, who frescoed the Pelucca with the famous cycle of the Villa La Pelucca frescoes, most of which is now preserved at the Pinacoteca di Brera in Milan and in other major international museums, such as the Wallace Collection in London, the Louvre in Paris and the Condé Museum in Chantilly.

=== 18th century ===
The 1751 census documents that the municipality had 725 inhabitants and was administered by a general council, convened at least once a year. In the second half of the century, reforms introduced by Empress Maria Theresa of Austria rationalized administrative structures and revived social and economic life, and the municipality of Sesto San Giovanni came directly under the jurisdiction of the podestà of Milan. In 1771 the inhabitants of Sesto San Giovanni numbered 1,682.

== 19th century ==
In 1809 the suppressed municipalities of Cassina de' Gatti and Sant'Alessandro were aggregated, not united, to the municipality of Sesto San Giovanni, and the population reached 2,248. From the beginning of the century, Sesto was confirmed as one of the favorite destinations of Milanese nobles, who chose these territories for their country residences, from where they could manage the plots of land they owned. The whole territory, or almost all of it, was owned by about thirty families: among the most important were the Zorns, the Visconti, the Mylius, the Serbelloni-Busca, the Puricelli Guerra, the Vigoni and the De Ponti; the latter were not nobles, but farmers who grew rich to the point of buying the villa and land from the Visconti d'Aragona. By the end of the century the De Ponti family were among the most important landowners in Sesto, with properties ranging from Rondò to Torretta. The local economy was thus based on agriculture and silkworm breeding, which would lead to manufacturing development from the second half of the century. Land tenure was under sharecropping contracts until the mid-nineteenth century, when the vast agrarian estates would be divided to be managed by less numerous families and with colonial contracts, which were shorter and more adaptable to the actual harvests. The great increase in population at the end of the century would cause a surplus of labor in the countryside, which would be absorbed by the establishment of manufacturing.

=== The spinning mills ===
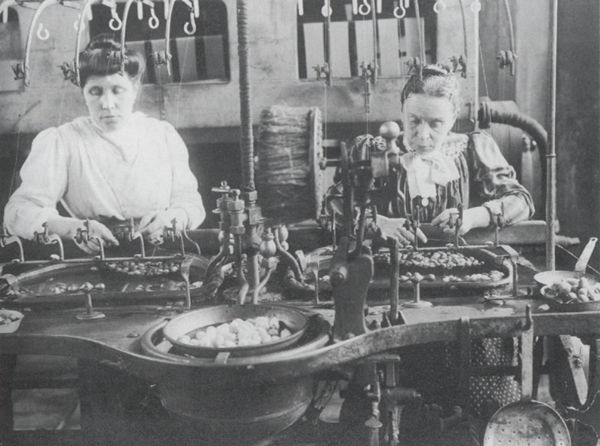
Women at work in the Puricelli Guerra spinning mill, late 19th century.

In 1832 the first spinning mill in Sesto was opened by Giuseppe Puricelli Guerra in a courtyard of his family's villa, Villa Puricelli Guerra. In 1840 it was modernized with the introduction of steam-powered "pulping basins," a technology of excellence for the time. These innovations would contribute to overcoming the artisan concept and provide employment for a fair number of people. In the following decades other spinning mills were opened: that of Enrico Mylius, the Savini (later Gaslini, as it was acquired by the Gaslini nobles, a family from Milan), on the old road to Monza, the De Ponti inside the Villa Visconti d'Aragona, the Gnocchi, and the Chiavelli at the Valdimagna farmstead. In 1878 there were seven spinning mills in Sesto San Giovanni, employing 738 people. In 1840 Italy's second railway line after the Naples-Portici, the Milan-Monza, came into operation; it had an intermediate station at Sesto, destined to extend to the Swiss border and to connect, from 1882, with central Europe through the Gotthard Tunnel. In 1876 the Milan-Monza tramway was also inaugurated, parallel to the railway, initially horse-drawn, and later electrified by the Edison company in 1901. This infrastructure connected Sesto to Milan and to European markets. The spinning mills steadily modernized, production increased, the first machinery was introduced, and a slow economic transformation of the town began in the second half of the century: alongside agriculture, processing a product related to it, the silkworm, Sesto industry was born. Likewise, a unique humus for future industrialization was formed: when large industries arose, the spinning mill worker was ready to switch to another type of processing.

=== The villas ===
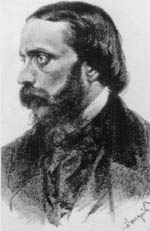
Giuseppe Rovani.

Along with the very first manufacturing settlements, it was in this century that villas were built and expanded for the families of landowners, nobles, and early industrialists: for example, the Villa Mylius, next to Villa Zorn, the residence of Enrico Mylius from the early 18th century. It became a lively cultural salon, through which personalities such as Carlo Cattaneo, Massimo d'Azeglio, Alessandro Manzoni and Vincenzo Monti passed. The latter dedicated some famous verses to Sesto, while Manzoni in I promessi sposi (The Betrothed), had Renzo Tramaglino, returning from the Lazaretto, transit through Sesto. Also at Villa Mylius, Barnaba Oriani conducted, from the turret of the villa, part of his astronomical studies. Some of the representatives of the Milanese scapigliatura also tied their destinies to Sesto: Giuseppe Rovani, who led part of his dissipated and irregular life in Sesto, and the painter Tranquillo Cremona, supported by the patron Giuseppe Puricelli Guerra, an artist himself.

=== The Risorgimento ===
Sesto and its citizens took part in the Risorgimento uprisings aimed at obtaining national independence: in 1848 some Sesto citizens participated in the Milanese underground organizations, the First Italian War of Independence, the Five Days of Milan, the Expedition of the Thousand, and the Second and Third Italian Wars of Independence. Sesto also participated in the African War of 1896, and fellow citizen Gaetano Gaslini, an army lieutenant and silver medalist for military valor, died in Adwa.

In 1861, with the establishment of the Kingdom of Italy, the municipality of Sesto had 4,716 inhabitants. In 1866, the hamlet of Occhiate was separated from Sesto and was aggregated with Brugherio. In 1869, the suppressed municipality of Cassina de' Gatti was permanently united with the municipality of Sesto San Giovanni. In 1880, Sesto had about 6,000 inhabitants and already had the infrastructure that would foster its later development. According to a turn-of-the-century statistic, there were over ten thousand mulberry trees in the Sesto area. From their cultivation and silkworm breeding, tenants earned cash, mainly due to the city's spinning mills, which would contribute to the transformation of the city's economy from agriculture to agro-manufacturing. The grain harvest, on the other hand, served to pay rent to the landlords and feed their families.

=== The first factories ===
Toward the end of the century, the Sesto silk industry experienced a period of sharp decline: textiles developed further north, where the slopes favored the exploitation of water as a driving force. The first workshops opened in Sesto, which began to absorb the spinning mill workers who had been out of work. The turning point for industry is represented with the opening of the St. Gotthard railway tunnel, connected to the Milan-Monza: Sesto and its territories could finally receive the raw materials (iron ore) and the necessary energy (coal) for the constituting steel industry. In 1887 the process of industrial settlement began in Sesto San Giovanni: the Sigmund Strauss mechanical strip weaving mill opened, introducing modern industrial criteria that differed from existing systems. In 1891 opened O.S.V.A., or Officine Sesto San Giovanni & Valsecchi Abramo, a historic Italian manufacturer of hardware, household, faucets and, later, electrical appliances.

== 20th century ==
=== The turn of the century and the First World War ===
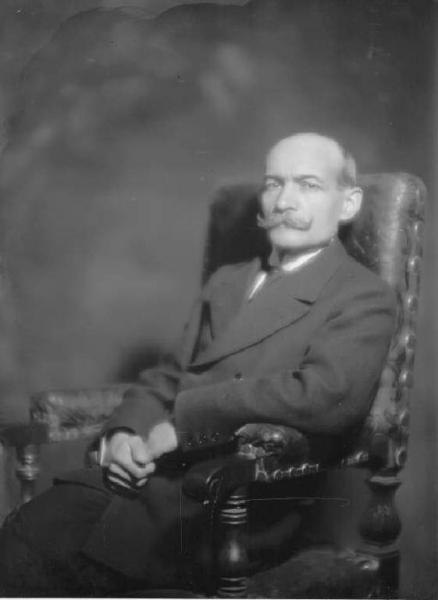
Ercole Marelli, founder of the engineering company of the same name, in 1919.

At the turn of the nineteenth and twentieth centuries, industrialization began in Sesto: a number of Milanese entrepreneurs (Breda, Camona, Marelli, Spadaccini) needed to move their factories from the Lombard capital, and Sesto suited them: the Sesto area offered ample space for increasingly large and modern companies, lower-priced land of excellent quality since it was far from the Milanese water-meadows; the area also had the necessary infrastructure: frequent and convenient connections with Milan were ensured by the tramway, and through the railway and freight yard the regions of central Europe could be reached. Companies starting production activities in Sesto San Giovanni needed abundant labor, and most of the first workers were commuters from the Lecco, Como, Brescia and Bergamo areas who arrived in Sesto by rail. From Milan, on the other hand, the technicians who studied and designed the future manufacturing plants arrived by streetcar.

In the first 20 years of the twentieth century, many companies opened in Sesto San Giovanni: in 1903, Breda and the Campari factory; two years later it was the turn of Ercole Marelli, Edizioni Madella, the cast iron foundries of Attilio Franco and Luigi Balconi, the Gabbioneta Pumps factory, and the Luigi Spadaccini rope factories. In 1906 the Acciaierie e Ferriere Lombarde Falck factories opened and in 1910 the Italian firm of Maggi food products. It was during this period that Sesto San Giovanni was nicknamed Little Manchester.

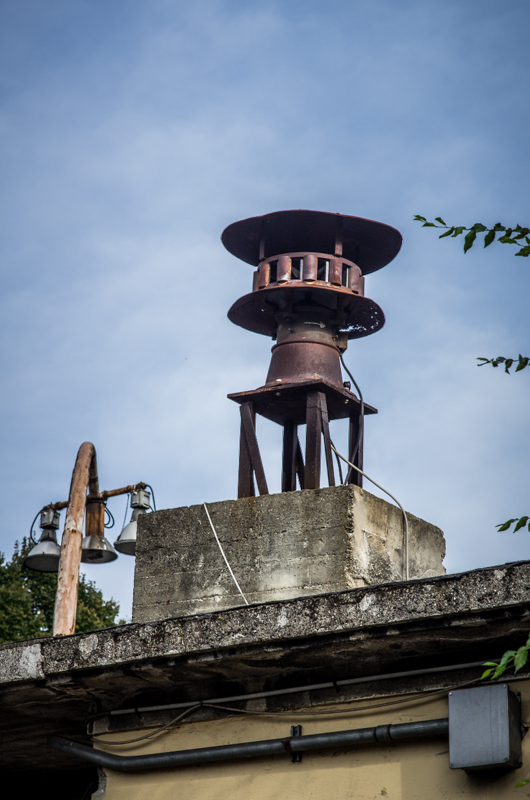
The siren of the Falck Union Plant, which for years marked the times of the city.

With the first factories there was also a significant increase in population: in 1901 there were 6,952 inhabitants, ten years later there were 13,667. This increase encouraged, in parallel, the urban development of the city: between 1903 and 1911 the new Sesto was born, west of the railroad, around the Rondò. Some of the entrepreneurs who took part in industrialization in Sesto contributed greatly to the town's urban growth. Ernesto Breda and Luigi Spadaccini, between today's Via Rovani, Via Cattaneo, and Via Carducci, built several dwelling houses for their workers and employees. Falck built the Falck Village, expanding the original mill town of the Attilio Franco foundries. This paternalistic tendency lasted until about 1940: in order to have a stable workforce at their disposal, housing and stable housing units were built by various companies in Sesto, such as Osva, Gabbioneta and Ercole Marelli. It was during these years that the Sesto labor movement was being established with organizations, trade unions and mutual aid societies of Catholic and, above all, socialist orientation.

During the period of World War I, the city had a fairly lukewarm attitude and, on the part of the working-class and proletarian classes, there was a decided adherence to non-interventionist ideas and issues. The industries in Sesto expanded, strengthened also by the many public orders and the conversion to war production; Falck, for example, opened from 1917 the Concordia, Vittoria and Vulcano factories, which joined the historic Unione factory. Four "integrated industrial groups" were established: Falck, Breda, Marelli and Pirelli, each of which was organized and articulated into several factories. The physiognomy of the city changed again and the great industrial belt that would characterize the Sesto area for the entire century and beyond took shape.

=== Fascism and the Second World War ===
==== The first post-war period ====
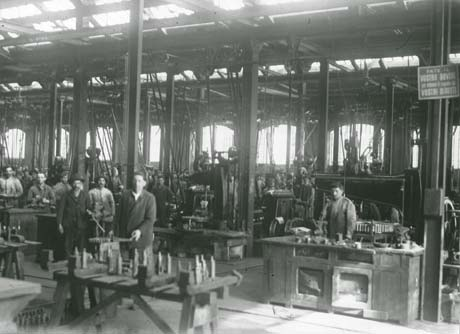
Turnery and adjustment department at Breda in the 1920s.

After the economic crisis due to World War I, businesses continued to consolidate: among others, Magneti Marelli's Plant B (accumulators) was established in 1927. With the development of industry, Sesto San Giovanni was hit by a strong wave of migration and became a seething melting pot: professionalism, technical knowledge, cultures, ideologies and policies that were different from each other, yet all converging on labor issues, began to confront and enrich each other. In 1919 the Chamber of Labor was opened in Sesto San Giovanni and the first riots and strikes began, aimed at improving wages, working conditions, and in 1920 the first occupation of the factories by blue-collar workers was recorded, in what is remembered as the Two Red Years. From 1921 a new and different migration began: many workers from central Italy and Emilia-Romagna forced to emigrate because of harassment by fascist action squads landed in factories where there was still room for political action.

==== The fascist period ====
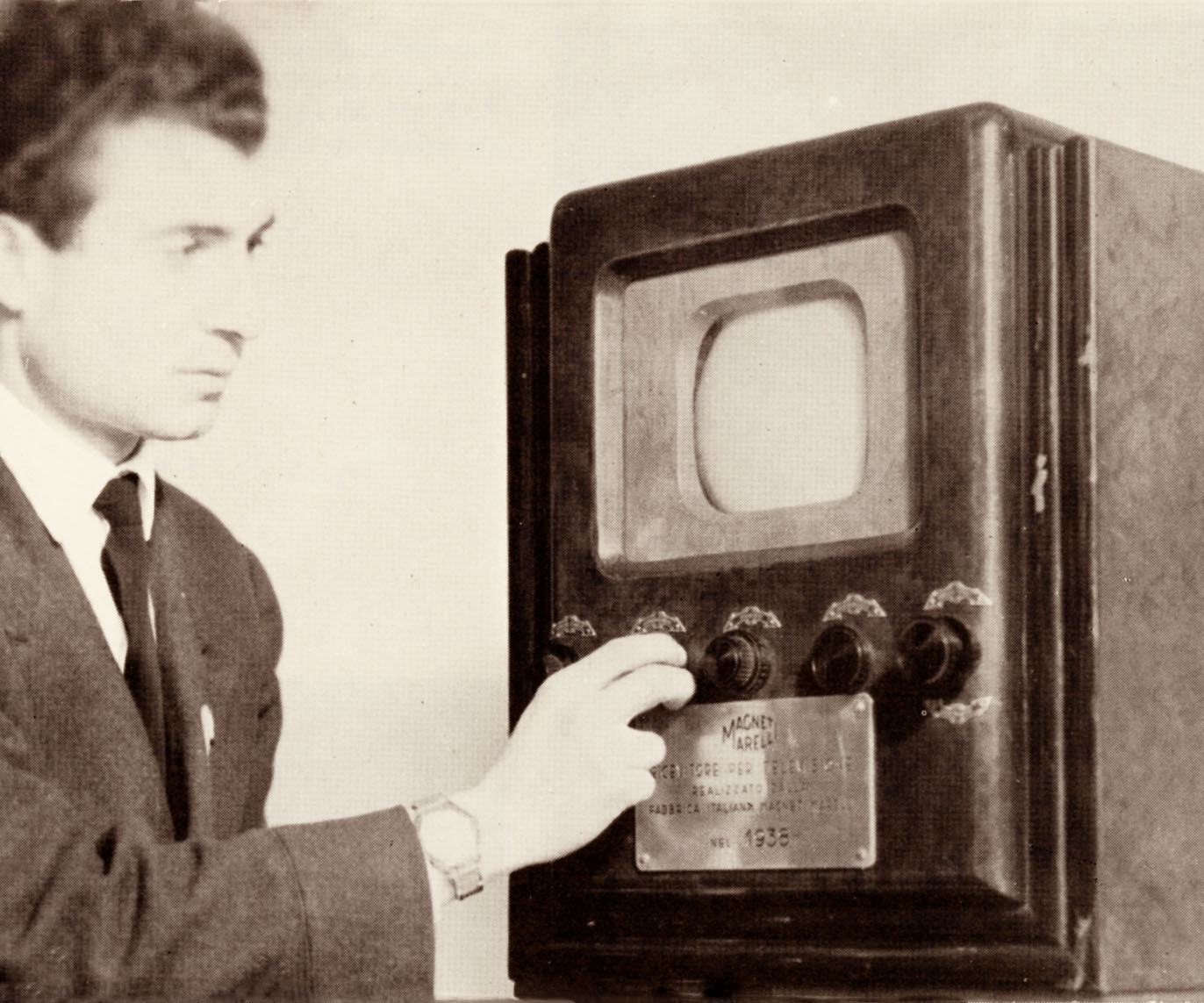
A television receiver, one of the first television sets made by Magneti Marelli in 1938.

Fascism struggled quite a bit to establish itself in Sesto San Giovanni: with its strong working-class, socialist and communist consciousness, Sesto immediately put up a strenuous opposition to the regime, so much so that it has been remembered ever since as the Stalingrad of Italy, a city that was already resistant during the Russian Civil War and especially known for the Battle of Stalingrad. In 1922, the then socialist mayor Umberto Comi refused to hand over the municipality to the fascists, appealing to the popular mandate that had elected him. The first fascist actions harshly involved the Chamber of Labor, but it was not until 1925 that a fascist party headquarters would be opened in the city. Fascistization of the factories was particularly difficult and in some cases, as at Breda, never succeeded. By 1926 working-class unity was being strengthened and went beyond the parties: anarchists, communists, socialists and Catholics found themselves united in an underground and difficult struggle that increasingly took on the features of a true clandestine organization. In 1931 the movement was detected by the police and within a few months about sixty people were arrested and referred to the Special Court. The Great Depression of 1929 affected the Italian economy starting the following year. In Sesto, the crisis resulted in layoffs and wage cuts. Opposition to the regime reorganized on two fronts: one illegal and clandestine, the other legal, aimed at infiltrating fascist bodies. As early as 1932 this dual organization succeeded in achieving results, preventing a further decrease in wages and later obtaining the recognition of occupational diseases. The economy restarted around 1935, coinciding with the Ethiopian War and Fascist Italy's support for Franco's troops in Spain, when Sesto industry converted (again) to arms production.

==== The outbreak of World War II ====
Between 1936 and 1942 Sesto San Giovanni saw the establishment of several small and medium-sized mechanical and electromechanical companies in the area. The population grew: in 1940 there were about 40,000 inhabitants, but many more workers in the Sesto factories exceeded that number in these years. Political life and opposition to Fascism continued on the two fronts, clandestine and legal, and at the outbreak of the Spanish Civil War, the workers' reaction was strong, so much so that a group participated in the International Brigades, while in the factories armaments destined for the Francoists were sabotaged. In 1939 the dual anti-fascist organization was dismantled by the police, but it was soon reorganized, and with Italy's entry into World War II the struggle against fascism became open and declared. In the factories, anti-fascism was rampant and the intervention of the OVRA became increasingly heavy: dozens of arrests among workers aimed at crushing the clandestine organization against the regime. However, this opposition that gathered different mindsets, from communists to Catholics, had yet to find a common denominator such as to pose a real threat to fascism, but it would be the fertile social fabric for the general uprising and popular insurrection of the years to come.

==== The strikes of 1943 ====
The first years of the war brought an economic crisis that had strong repercussions in the popular consumer sector: the sudden rise in prices was not matched by a consequent increase in wages; goods weaved by fascism in quality and quantity did not reach the minimum subsistence level and had to be supplemented with free market or black market purchases at often prohibitive prices. Workers in the cities, who did not have easy relations with the countryside, went hungry. Out of this situation, which had become untenable, came the great strikes of 1943 that paralyzed all industry in northern Italy for a few days, particularly the so-called industrial triangle, with mass strikes in factories in Milan (hence Sesto), Turin and Genoa. In Sesto, as elsewhere, the March 1943 uprisings were fueled more by demands for wage increases than by political claims: although already politically aware, this first, widespread, popular protest still had a spontaneous, non-political, and non-partisan character, and the circulating rallying words were often multiple and discordant.

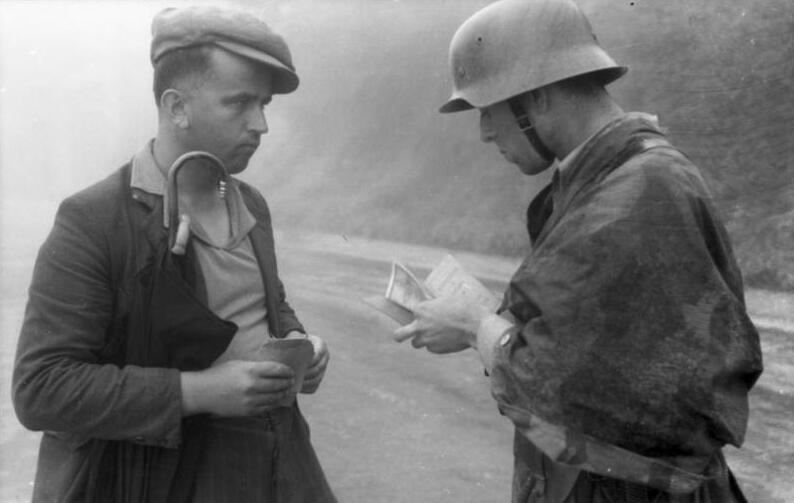
A German soldier checks the papers of an Italian civilian near Milan.

Following the example of the '43 strikes in Turin and Genoa, a large mass strike was also organized in the factories in Sesto: on the morning of March 23, the call to strike in some departments of Ercole Marelli found ready adherence from the workers. At the sound of the siren, all 1,000 employees of the second plant crossed their arms, while the management hurried to inform the political authorities. The prefect of Milan and the fascists threatened with machine gun fire those who did not resume work, but activity did not resume for the entire day. The next day some organizers of the protest are arrested, among them Giulio Casiraghi and Umberto Fogagnolo, who would be together in death the following year in what would be remembered as the Piazzale Loreto Massacre. However, on the same day the uprising expanded: along with the Marelli workers, workers from some departments of Falck and two sections of Breda went on strike. Also at Breda was another massive strike in November '43, when the factory came to a complete halt and the plants were surrounded by a column of tanks. For the first time the Germans welcomed a delegation of workers and seemed open to negotiation. There was a growing sense that the enemy was weakening and about to collapse. With the strikes of 1943, what would be confirmed in the following two years of clandestine and armed struggle leading to the Liberation was foreshadowed: the factories of Sesto San Giovanni were the advanced garrison, the driving and leading element in the struggle against Nazi-Fascism.

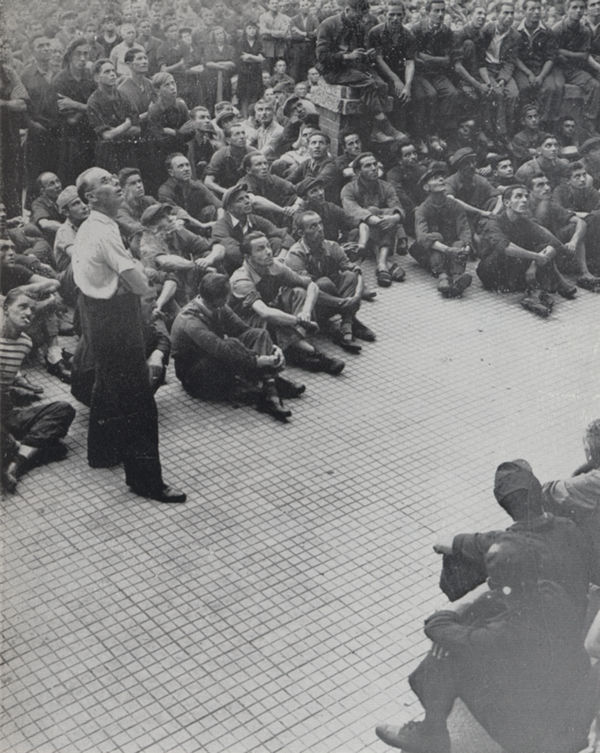
March 1944, striking Breda workers listen to German General Funck enjoining them to resume work.

When fascism fell on July 25, the first workers' organizations were formed, such as the freely elected internal commissions in the factories, which would later be disbanded after September 8. The advent of the Badoglio government was at first welcomed as positive, given also the tolerance toward anti-fascist parties and movements, but in the factories opposition to the continuation of military intervention was still very strong and organized. Domestic political events, including the fall of Mussolini, the flight of the King, the proclamation of the Social Republic and especially the formation of the first partisan groups, had led to the occupation of the factories by the Germans. Moreover, the struggle in the factories became even more risky: this was the time of the first deportations of hundreds of workers to the concentration camps of Mauthausen, Gusen, Dachau and many others. To keep alive the refusal to cooperate and stimulate the political struggle, the demands posed were still economic in nature, such as increased wages, rations of bread, rice and sugar. Weapons began to circulate in the factories.

In December 1943, some 65,000 factory workers in Sesto crossed their arms and went into a struggle with over a million workers in Milan, and for eight days war production was completely paralyzed. Factory employees for the first time stood in solidarity with the workers and came out openly in struggle. The consciousness-raising of the working masses was now accomplished. The Agitation Committees were born, in which men and women linked to the Communist Party of Italy, the Christian Democracy and the Italian Socialist Party of Proletarian Unity concurred: these committees had the task of directing, supporting and guiding workers to resistance and non-cooperation with the Nazi-Fascists. They performed a delicate service of covering and assisting compromised, deported and persecuted people and their families, and maintained relations with the C.L.N.'s finance committee.

==== The strikes of 1944 ====
From the beginning of 1944, the Agitation Committees prepared a massive demonstration of protest. From March 1 to 8, a political general strike paralyzed factories in Piedmont, Lombardy, Veneto, Emilia, Tuscany and Liguria: it was the most massive strike movement that broke out in Europe against the Nazi occupation, and more than a million workers participated in Italy, giving the national cause the character of a people's war. Of the 350,000 strikers in Lombardy, about 70,000 were workers and employees of the large factories in Sesto, where German and republican repression during the strike days became fierce, and arrests and deportations became increasingly frequent, even after the strike was broken.

==== Resistance and Liberation ====
Flag of the National Liberation Committee

The workers' resistance in Sesto San Giovanni was articulated along two precise lines: on the one hand, participation in the partisan formations operating in the mountains, which were joined by those more openly compromised workers for whom it would prove risky to continue their activity and work in the factory; on the other hand, resistance organized inside the factories themselves, a resistance made up of sabotage, propaganda and underground actions to fuel opposition to the Nazi-Fascists.

Following the strikes of March '44 and the subsequent repression, the first partisan and combatant formations were organized inside the factories: some groups were Patriotic Action Squads, the SAP, which would be the architects of some actions in the city. Patriotic Action Groups, the GAP, were also formed in Milan, and the first nucleus saw the light just inside the factories of Sesto San Giovanni, more precisely at the V section of Breda. Later, the Antonio Gramsci detachments were structured in Sesto and Niguarda, the 5 Giornate in Porta Romana and Porta Vittoria, and the Matteotti Brigades in Porta Ticinese. These detachments, with the nascent Partisan groups of the Lecco and Como area, formed the 3rd Garibaldi Lombardy Brigade in which many people from Sesto participated. The actions of the 3rd GAP were, among others, against the Germans in Piazzale Argentina in Milan, against the Milan Federal Aldo Resega and against the Casa del Fascio in Sesto. Alongside the communist and socialist-inspired SAP and GAP, a militant anti-fascism also developed in Sesto among the Catholics of the People's Brigades, which would be of fundamental contribution to the partisan struggle.

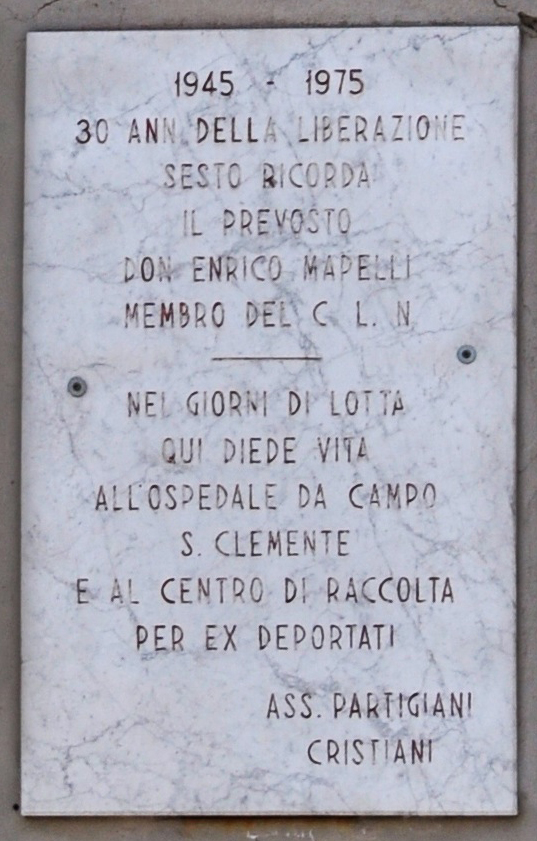
Memorial plaque on Cavour Street in memory of Don Enrico Mapelli, provost and member of the C.L.N. of Sesto San Giovanni and Bicocca.

The Sesto C.L.N. was born in the winter of 1943/44 and found its origin in the unitary activity of struggle in the factories. Established early compared to the others in the Milan area, it was significantly named "CLN of Sesto San Giovanni and Bicocca." The tasks of the clandestine C.L.N. were organizational and political, and it was the committee that maintained links with the partisan formations that were being formed among the masses. Dependent on the C.L.N of Sesto were the company C.L.Ns of 40 factories and small workshops in addition to the area, ward, public agency and bank committees. From March 1945, the C.L.N., which until then used to meet in the city streets or countryside, decided to set as its permanent meeting place the San Luigi Oratory in the parish of Santo Stefano.

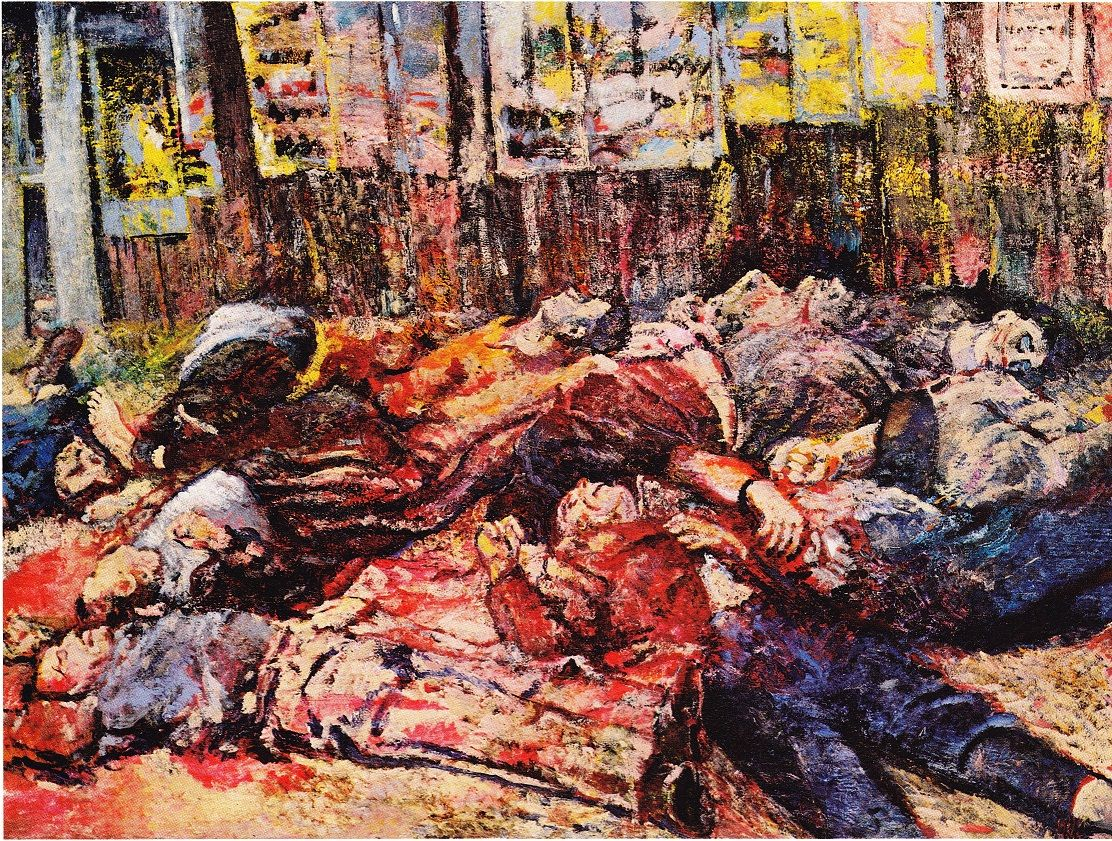
Martyrs of Piazzale Loreto, 1944 painting by Aligi Sassu.

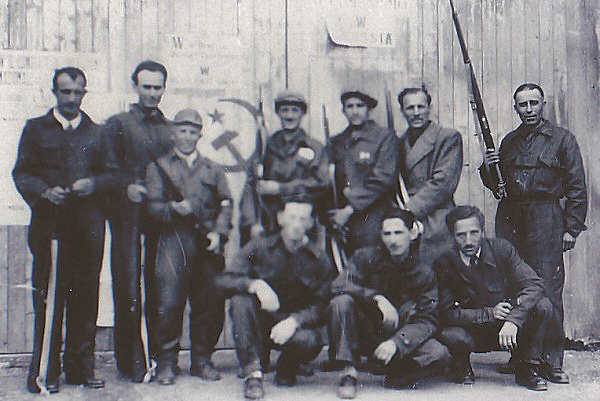
Breda workers armed to defend the factory from the Nazi-Fascists, 1945.

Sesto San Giovanni, a city with a gold medal of military valor for the Resistance.

Throughout 1944, anti-German and anti-fascist riots and demonstrations continued, both in the factories and in the squares. An imminent insurrection was increasingly emerging, with the advance of Allied troops on one side and popular protests, partisan actions and daily guerrilla warfare on the other. German repression did not subside: on August 10, 1944, fifteen partisans and opponents of the regime were shot at Piazzale Loreto in what history would remember as the Piazzale Loreto Massacre. Six of these fifteen antifascists were leaders of the Sesto resistance: Giulio Casiraghi, Domenico Fiorani, Umberto Fogagnolo, Renzo Del Riccio, Libero Temolo and Eraldo Soncini. At the beginning of 1945, several strikes were proclaimed, which were openly joined by all the large factories in Sesto. In February, the commander of the area GNR, in a communiqué to the provincial command, defined Sesto as the cancer of Lombardy and recommended its complete destruction, apart from the factories, also calling for the deportation of the male population to Germany. Contacts between the factories and the Gappisti became more intense and tight. The C.L.N., in anticipation of a now imminent administrative responsibility, established emergency assignments among the various parties present in the city: the Christian Democracy was entrusted with the water, sanitary and administrative services; the Italian Communist Party and the Italian Socialist Party were entrusted with the political and public order services.

On the night of April 24-25, the first partisan groups began to descend from the mountains, making contact with the factory GAPs and together with them occupying the factories to preserve them from possible devastation by the retreating Germans. These were the days of general insurrection: workers, citizens, men and women poured into the streets of Sesto, waving tricolored flags and extolling freedom. Pirelli and Breda, whose neighboring factories covered a perimeter of more than ten kilometers, were occupied and garrisoned by workers in arms. Nazi-Fascist resistance was almost nonexistent yet tenacious, resulting in brief clashes of republican troops at Ercole Marelli and Pirelli. Snipers in the city and around the factories were quickly defeated. The partisans killed in these clashes were four and dozens were the wounded assisted in the field hospital activated by Don Mapelli in the parish kindergarten, near the San Luigi oratory. It was from the oratory, the permanent headquarters of the C.L.N., that a delegation left on April 26 to occupy the town hall and set up an emergency town council chaired by Rodolfo Camagni, an early anti-fascist.

The contribution of Sesto San Giovanni and its factories to the Resistance cost hundreds of arrests, deportations and murders: 553 were deported to concentration camps, of whom 220 perished and another 10 died later as a result of deportation. In total, there were 325 fallen citizens, or at any rate workers in the city's factories, who died in prison, by firing squad, fell in combat or in Nazi concentration camps. For the tribute of its fellow citizens to the national liberation struggle, Sesto San Giovanni was awarded the Gold Medal of Military Valor in 1971. In the 1960s, the Monument to the Resistance was inaugurated, a work by Piero Bottoni depicting the ups and downs of the Sesto Resistance from 1922 to the Liberation in 1945. In memory of the more than five hundred workers deported to concentration camps as a result of the strikes of '44 and the anti-fascist militancy, the Monument to the Deported was inaugurated in 1998, at the North Milan Park, the work of Lodovico Barbiano di Belgiojoso, a former deportee himself.

=== The postwar period and the economic miracle ===
In the immediate postwar period, Sesto found itself in very serious economic and social problems: there was a serious shortage of food, and some state warehouses were requisitioned by the CLN-led junta; those who hid foodstuffs for the black exchange were prosecuted. At the same time, small farms would be set up on the vacant land of some large companies based in Sesto. The city thus seemed to overcome its most difficult period.

Another major problem was labor: the factories in Sesto, with the exception of Breda, did not suffer heavy bombing, but were nevertheless on their knees. All of them thrived on armament production and their workforces swelled. After an initial, subsequently unsuccessful attempt by trade unions and workers' organizations to help reconvert production while maintaining employment levels, the initiative returned to the hands of the companies and owners, who implemented decisive reorganization and restructuring policies at great social cost. Between 1949 and 1951, thousands of workers in Sesto were laid off, despite the workers' bitter struggles to defend employment. In the same period, with state support using Marshall Plan funds, plants and machinery were renovated and some production sectors were cut: the most striking case was that of Breda, which divested its aeronautical production, despite the workers' hard union struggles to save the section.

From 1951 there was a marked increase in population, mainly due to a strong wave of migration that would continue until the early 1960s. In 1954 Sesto San Giovanni was awarded the Title of City, with Presidential Decree of April 10, 1954, signed by Luigi Einaudi and countersigned by Mario Scelba.

From 1953 until 1962, Sesto industries participated in the Italian economic miracle: production increased and a market for mass consumer goods (radios, televisions, refrigerators, automobiles, etc.) was born. Companies such as Breda, Ercole and Magneti Marelli, Osva launched new products that achieved considerable success. This is the period when the myth of Sesto San Giovanni as a "citadel of factories" was reinforced. Everywhere in the area new enterprises flourished, and between 1954 and 1963 the land area allocated to industry grew by 35.6 percent.

=== The 1960s ===
Throughout the 1960s the labor movement in Sesto was still very strong: strikes and protests, self-organizations and demonstrations were organized to obtain recognition of workers' rights. In 1962 there was a strike for the national collective bargaining agreement, and protests continued for nine months; from 1966 to 1968 there were more strikes for contract renewals at Breda, Ercole Marelli and Falck. However, it was the 1969 contract renewal that saw the high point of the union struggle: Sesto was involved at all levels in the negotiations of the period known as the hot autumn. The so-called hard line of the students who participated in 1968 was welcomed by the young workers of Ercole Marelli, who would organize total roadblocks.

=== The 1970s ===
At the beginning of the decade, Sesto San Giovanni would be counted among the cities decorated for military valor for the War of Liberation since on June 18, 1971, it was awarded the Gold Medal of Military Valor for the tribute of its fellow citizens to the Resistance. The medal would be placed on the city's banner the following year by then Prime Minister Giulio Andreotti.

From the struggles of the workers' and students' movement of 1968 and 1969, Italy inherited its years of lead, and Sesto, with its factories and workers and the many union struggles that had intersected the fabric of the city since the beginning of the century, would not be exempt. In 1971, right in the midst of the strategy of tension, Sesto was hit by a fascist bombing: on the night of May 22-23, an explosive device exploded at the base of the Monument to the Resistance, right in the center of town. The bombing was claimed by the SAMs, who claimed two other bombings in Milan on the same night. After the episode, there were spontaneous demonstrations by anti-fascist citizens at the monument and a one-hour strike was called for May 24 in the city's major factories.

In 1976, the young Sesto man Walter Alasia, the son of Pirelli workers, who had first joined Lotta Continua and then joined the Red Brigades, was killed in a firefight in which anti-terrorism marshal Bazzega and the then deputy superintendent of Sesto San Giovanni, Padovani, lost their lives. Alasia was named after the Milanese "column" of the Red Brigades, the Walter Alasia column, which in 1980, by then out of the organization, killed Ercole Marelli personnel director Renato Briano and Falck technical director Manfredo Mazzanti.

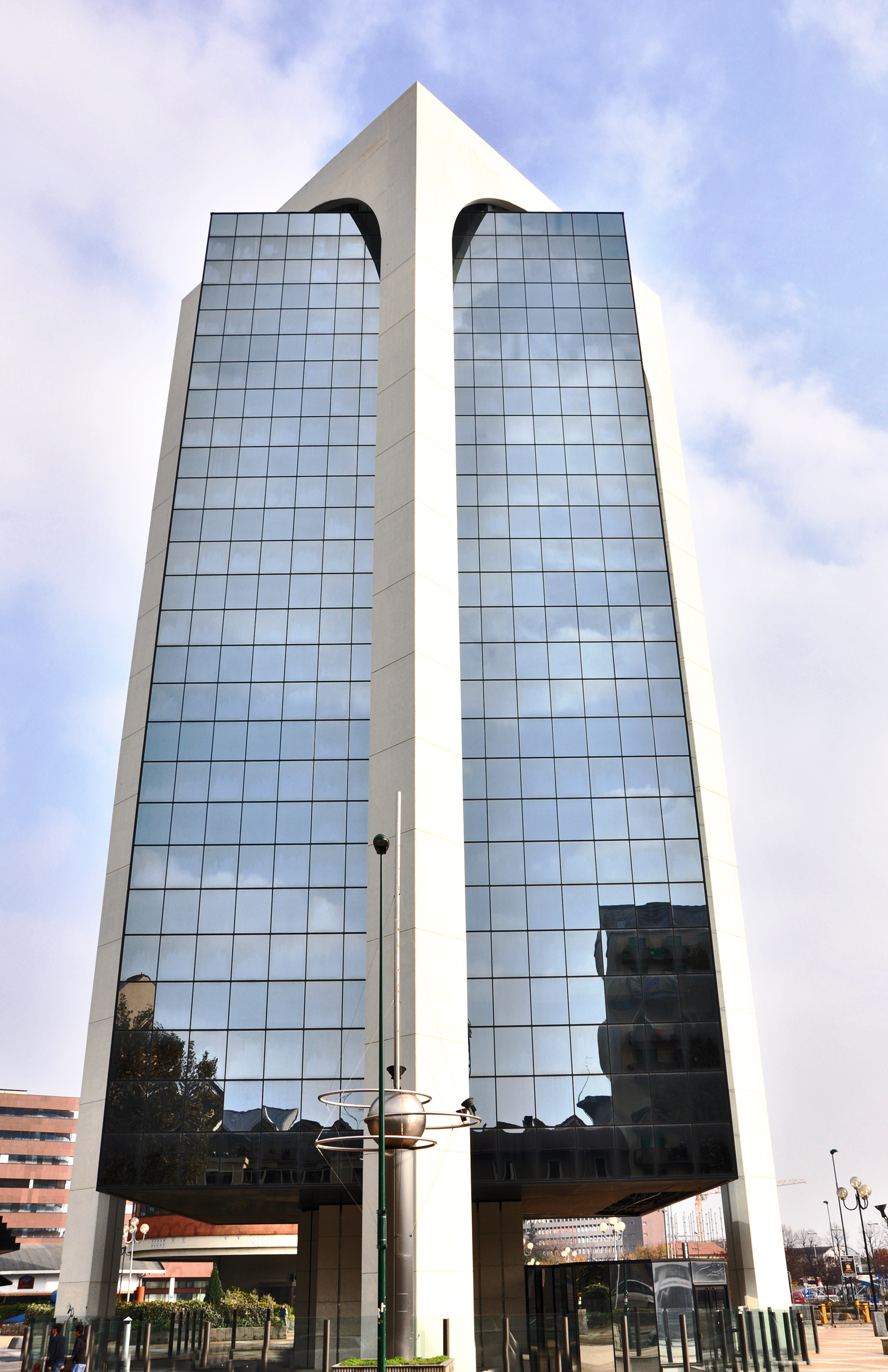
Architect Giancarlo Marzorati's suspended tower.

From the beginning of the 1960s until the mid-1970s, several events had a strong impact on the companies in Sesto: the whole country experienced an economic recession, from 1968 there was a contraction in electromechanics and heavy engineering, from 1971 there was the world steel crisis, and finally the energy crisis in 1974. Despite labor union struggles and demands, companies in Sesto faced these difficulties by drastically reducing staff and launching radical corporate restructuring and reorganization plans.

=== The 1980s ===
The 1970s were only the harbingers of what would inevitably happen from the 1980s onward, when large firms in Sesto began to close their doors. In 1983 Ercole Marelli closed, and the following year it was the turn of Magneti Marelli. In the same years Breda and Falck faced difficulties in the manufacturing sectors in which they were engaged: heavy engineering, steel, and nuclear power. Plant closures, departments and staff reductions followed. In the early 1990s, the two largest historical companies in Sesto San Giovanni also put an end to their nearly 100-year history of production. A major employment crisis began: thousands lost their jobs; Falck laid off almost seven thousand employees between 1980 and 1986.

There was a real abandonment of the productive areas, and the municipal administration decided to start, in the mid-1980s, the planning of a new PRG aimed at replacing the existing one from 1973. The new PRG, adopted in 1994, confirmed industrial use for the areas occupied by the Falck steel company.

=== The 1990s ===
In 1995, Falck dismantled all steel plants in Sesto. Seeing little chance of profit from a sale, the Falck Group decided to commission architect Kenzō Tange to design a redevelopment of the areas. In the same year, the Agenzia Sviluppo del Nord Milano (North Milan Development Agency) was formed, in which the municipalities of Sesto San Giovanni, Bresso, Cologno Monzese, Cinisello Balsamo, the Province of Milan, the Chamber of Commerce and other public and private shareholding companies in the area participate.

It was during these years that the so-called tertiarization of Sesto took place, and many national and international companies chose the city to set up their headquarters or branches. These include Alitalia, Oracle, Wind, Epson, ABB and Alstom. There was a relevant development, throughout the 1990s and even beyond, of various activities related to the tertiary sector: many companies engaged in wholesale trade and transportation of goods were established in the area of Sesto. Along with the increase in activities in the tertiary sector, there has been a significant increase in credit and insurance activities.

== 21st century ==
The former industrial areas of Sesto remain for the most part still to be redeveloped: in the 1990s and early 2000s there were several projects, proposals and debates on the different possible destinations, until a redevelopment project by architect Renzo Piano was presented in 2008 and adopted by the administration in the following years. The project envisages the redevelopment of the entire former Falck area, as well as of Italia and Edison avenues. Inside it is planned to build a new Health and Research City that, when completed, will house the Carlo Besta National Neurological Institute and the National Cancer Institute.

The Sesto San Giovanni of today is no longer identifiable as the "citadel of factories" or as the "little Manchester," nor perhaps as the "Stalingrad of Italy": the economic and political events that have marked its history, especially in the last century, nevertheless allow it to preserve its own originality. The end of big business, the closure of large factories, and the disintegration of the working class did not coincide with the end of the city, even from the cultural point of view: the heritage of experience and knowledge of entrepreneurs, technicians, and workers that formed the culture of labor in Sesto during the twentieth century was not dispersed, but was rather exploited to overcome the most critical moments brought about by the end of traditional businesses and labor contracts, to relaunch the city as an important economic-productive center.

== See also ==
- History of Milan

== Bibliography ==
- Pietro Lincoln Cadioli (1976). Sesto San Giovanni dalle origini ad oggi. Sesto San Giovanni: Edizioni "Il cavallino d'oro" - Arti Grafiche G. Beveresco. [ISBN unspecified]
- Ezio Parma (2000). Enciclopedia Sesto San Giovanni. Sesto San Giovanni: Ezio Parma Editore. [ISBN unspecified]
- Ezio Parma, ed. (1992). Metamorfosi di una città. Sesto San Giovanni: Arti grafiche Amilcare Pizzi. [ISBN unspecified]
- Istituto milanese per la storia dell’età contemporanea della Resistenza e del movimento operaio (a cura di) (2000). Annali 5. Milano: Franco Angeli.
- Sabrina Greco, ed. (2002). Costruzione e trasformazione del paesaggio: la città industriale di Sesto San Giovanni. Milano: CLUP.
- Giuseppe Valota (2008). Streikertransport - La deportazione politica nell’area industriale di Sesto San Giovanni 1943-1945. Milano: Guerini e Associati. p. 454.
- Gianfranco Petrillo, ed. (1981). La città delle fabbriche. Sesto San Giovanni 1880-1945. Cassago Brianza: CENB. p. 170. [ISBN unspecified]
- Enzo Collotti; Renato Sandri; Frediano Sessi, eds. (2000). Dizionario della Resistenza. Vol. 1: Storia e geografia della Liberazione. Torino: Einaudi. p. 617.
- Enzo Collotti; Renato Sandri; Frediano Sessi, eds. (2006). Dizionario della Resistenza. Vol. 2: Luoghi, formazioni, protagonisti. Torino: Einaudi. p. 881.
