= Pezzini =

Origin
- Language: Latin

Pezzini is a surname ultimately derived from the Medieval Latin word "pecia," or "petia," meaning "piece," sometimes a piece of cloth, sometimes a token, like a silver coin. As a surname it is thought to have been taken on as a habitational name from any of numerous places so named, such as Pezzana and Piedmont.

== Notable people with this name ==
- Cristoforo Pezzini (1892–1987), Italian politician
- Fabricio Pezzini (born 1978), Argentine racing driver
- Lucas Pezzini Leiva (born 1987), Brazilian footballer

== Fictional Characters ==
- Sara Pezzini, or The Witchblade, a DC Comics character
