= Mentasti =

Mentasti is an Italian surname. Notable people with the surname include:

- Luigi Mentasti (1883–1958), Italian army officer
- Piero Mentasti (1897–1958), Italian politician
