= Pietro Bellora =

Italian politician (1891–1959)

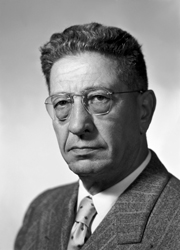

Italian Senator from Lombardy
- In office 8 May 1948 – 21 November 1959
- Preceded by: None
- Succeeded by: Title jointly held
- Constituency: Clusone

Personal details
- Born: Pietro Bellora; 6 December 1891 Gallarate, Varese
- Died: 21 November 1959 (aged 67)
- Party: Christian Democracy
- Profession: Entrepreneur

Pietro Bellora (6 December 1891 – 21 November 1959) was a member of the Italian Christian Democracy, and was an Italian Senator from Lombardy. He died in office in 1959.

== Political career ==
President of the Association of Cotton Industries and member of the board of directors of the Industrial Confederation, Bellora obtained three consecutive elections to the Italian Senate, serving from 1948 to 1959.

== Role in the Senate ==
=== Committee assignments ===
- Committee on Trade and Industry
  - Legislature I - II III

=== Electoral history ===
1948 election for the Italian Senate

- Direct mandate for Clusone (81.0%) obtaining the landslide victory required by law (more than 2/3 of votes)

1953 election for the Italian Senate

- Direct mandate for Clusone (70.7%) obtaining the landslide victory required by law (more than 2/3 of votes)

1958 election for the Italian Senate

- Christian Democrat mandate thanks to his 67.4% of votes in Clusone

== See also ==
- Italian Senate election in Lombardy, 1948
- Italian Senate election in Lombardy, 1953

Italian Senate
Preceded by None	Italian Senator for Lombardy; 1948–1959; Direct mandate for Clusone 1948–1958	Succeeded by Title jointly held
