= 1948 Italian Senate election in Lombardy =

- 18 April 1948

All 31 Lombard seats to the Italian Senate
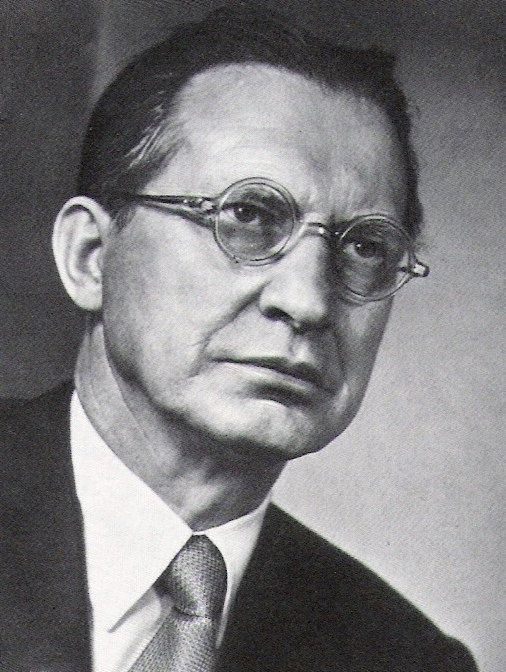

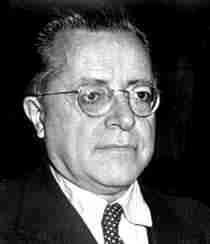
	First party	Second party
Leader	Alcide De Gasperi	Palmiro Togliatti
Party	DC	Popular Democratic Front
Seats won	18	10
Popular vote	1,854,032	1,164,769
Percentage	53.8%	33.8%

Lombardy elected its first delegation to the Italian Senate on 18 April 1948. This election was a part of national Italian general election of 1948 even if, according to the newly established Italian Constitution, every senatorial challenge in each Region is a single and independent race.

The election was won by the centrist Christian Democracy, as it happened at national level. Pavia and Mantua were the sole provinces to oppose this result, giving a plurality to the Social-Communist alliance.

== Background ==
Alcide De Gasperi's Christian Democracy had obtained very good results during quite all municipal elections in Lombardy in 1946. However, their Soviet-aligned opponents looked at this region as one of their possible zones of success, considering the local strength of the Socialist Party before the Fascist era.

Even if the Front obtained some seats in the agricultural south, De Gasperi obtained an absolute majority at regional level, with some exceptional peaks in the alpine north: Lombardy became the region with the highest number of constituencies where the landslide clausola was satisfied. The centre-left alliance between the Italian Democratic Socialist Party and the Italian Republican Party obtained some seats in Milan, a city led by Democratic Socialist mayor Antonio Greppi.

== Electoral system ==
The electoral system introduced in 1948 for the newly elected Senate was a strange hybrid which established a form of proportional representation into FPTP-like constituencies. A candidate needed a landslide victory of more than 65% of votes to obtain a direct mandate. All constituencies where this result was not reached entered into an at-large calculation based upon the D'Hondt method to distribute the seats between the parties, and candidates with the best percentages of suffrages inside their party list were elected.

== Results ==
Party	votes	votes (%)	seats
Christian Democracy	1,854,032	53.8	18
Popular Democratic Front	1,164,769	33.8	10
Socialist Unity+Italian Republican Party	364,642	10.8	3
Others	64,284	1.9	-
Total parties	3,447,727	100.0	31

Sources: Italian Ministry of the Interior

=== Constituencies ===
N°	Constituency	Elected	Party	Votes %	Others
1	Bergamo	Cristoforo Pezzini	Christian Democracy	73.5%	
2	Clusone	Pietro Bellora	Christian Democracy	81.0%	
3	Treviglio	Piero Mentasti	Christian Democracy	72.7%	
4	Brescia	Angelo Buizza	Christian Democracy	55.8%	
5	Breno	Angelo Cemmi	Christian Democracy	68.6%	
6	Chiari	Albino Donati	Christian Democracy	65.7%	
7	Salò	Francesco Zane	Christian Democracy	64.2%	
8	Como	Mariano Rosati	Christian Democracy	60.1%	
9	Lecco	Enrico Falck	Christian Democracy	55.8%	
10	Cantù	Lorenzo Spallino	Christian Democracy	60.3%	
11	Cremona	Gaetano Ferragni	Popular Democratic Front (PSI)	48.3%	
12	Crema	Ennio Zelioli	Christian Democracy	52.3%	
13	Mantua	Pietro Torelli	Popular Democratic Front (PSI)	44.0%	
14	Ostiglia	Clarenzo Menotti	Popular Democratic Front (PCI)	56.8%	
15	Milan 1	Merzagora's 2nd election		57.9%	seat ceded to Samek Lodovici
16	Milan 2	Gianbattista Boeri	Socialist Unity+Republican Party (PRI)	21.0%	Edoardo Origlia (DC) 54.5%
17	Milan 3	Enrico Gonzales	Socialist Unity+Republican Party (PSDI)	19.5%	
18	Milan 4	Giulio Bergmann	Socialist Unity+Republican Party (PRI)	20.0%	
19	Milan 5	Piero Montagnani	Popular Democratic Front (PCI)	42.7%	
20	Milan 6	Francesco Mariani	Popular Democratic Front (PSI)	51.8%	
21	Abbiategrasso	E.Samek Lodovici; Antonio Banfi	Christian Democracy; Popular Democratic Front (PCI)	51.4% 40.6%	
22	Rho	Carlo Perini	Christian Democracy	53.6%	Amilcare Locatelli (PSI) 36.2%
23	Monza	Mario Longoni	Christian Democracy	54.0%	
24	Vimercate	Cesare Merzagora	Christian Democracy (Indep.)	60.2%	
25	Lodi	Giuseppe Alberganti	Popular Democratic Front (PCI)	43.6%	Gianmaria Cornaggia (DC) 47.7%
26	Pavia	Italo Sinforiani	Popular Democratic Front (Gds)	43.0%	
27	Voghera	Cesare Gavina	Popular Democratic Front (PCI)	38.7%	
28	Vigevano	Giuseppe Cortese	Popular Democratic Front (PSI)	50.7%	
29	Sondrio	Ezio Vanoni	Christian Democracy	67.1%	
30	Varese	Antonio Bareggi	Christian Democracy	55.7%	
31	Busto Arsizio	Natale Santero	Christian Democracy	53.8%	

- Senators with a direct mandate have bold percentages. The electoral system was, in the other cases, a form of proportional representation and not a FPTP race: so candidates winning with a simple plurality could have (and usually had) a candidate (always a Christian democrat) with more votes in their constituency.

=== Substitutions ===
- Amilcare Locatelli for Rho (36.2%) replaced Pietro Torelli in 1948. Reason: death.
- Edoardo Origlia for Milan 2 (54.5%) replaced Antonio Bareggi in 1950. Reason: death.
- Gianmaria Cornaggia for Lodi (47.7%) replaced Carlo Perini in 1952. Reason: death.
