= Albino Donati =

Italian politician (1902–1972)

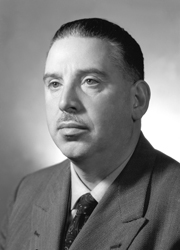

Italian Senator from Lombardy
- In office 8 May 1948 – 24 June 1953
- Preceded by: None
- Succeeded by: Title jointly held
- Constituency: Chiari

Personal details
- Born: Albino Donati; 31 March 1902 Bagnolo Mella, Brescia
- Died: 17 July 1972
- Party: Christian Democracy
- Profession: Lawyer

Albino Donati (31 March 1902 – 17 July 1972) was a member of the Italian Christian Democracy, and was an Italian Senator from Lombardy. He did not seek for re-election in 1953.

== Political career ==
Donati was a city councillor of Brescia and member of the board of directors of Cariplo. He obtained a landslide victory in 1948, but retired in 1953 to follow his private business.

== Role in the Senate ==
=== Committee assignments ===
- Committee on Wealth
  - Legislature I

=== Electoral history ===
- 1948 election for the Italian Senate
- Direct mandate for Chiari (65.7%) obtaining the landslide victory required by law (more than 2/3 of votes)

== See also ==
- Italian Senate election in Lombardy, 1948

== Footnotes ==
Italian Senate
Preceded by None	Italian Senator for Lombardy; 1948–1953; Direct mandate for Chiari 1948–1953	Succeeded by Title jointly held
