= Piazzale Loreto massacre =

1944 Nazi-Fascist massacre in Italy

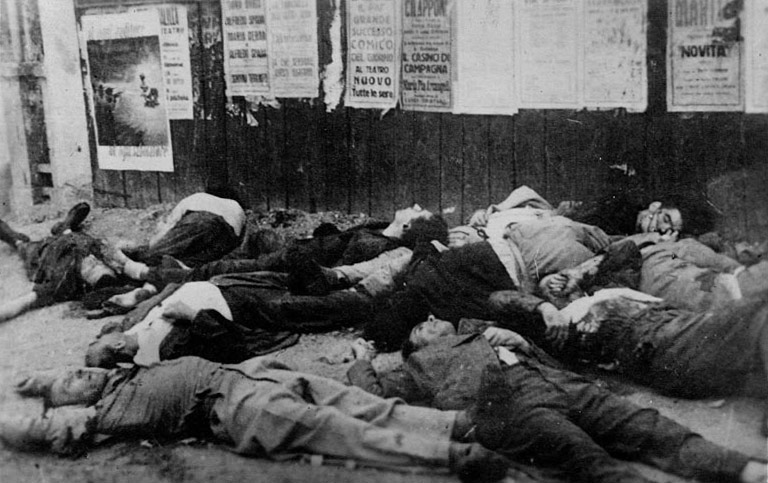
- Piazzale Loreto, August 10, 1944
- Location: 45°29′09″N 09°12′58″E; Milan, Italy
- Date: 10 August 1944; 82 years ago 05:45 (UTC+01:00)
- Attack type: Mass shooting
- Deaths: 15 partisans
- Perpetrators: Theo Saevecke, Nazi Security Commander in Milan; Ettore Muti Autonomous Mobile Legion (material executors)

Piazzale Loreto massacre was a Nazi-Fascist massacre that took place in Italy, on 10 August 1944 in Piazzale Loreto, Milan, during World War II.

Fifteen Italian partisans were shot by soldiers of the Oberdan group of the Ettore Muti Mobile Autonomous Legion of the Italian Social Republic, by order of the Nazi Sicherheitsdienst, and their bodies were exposed to the public.

We will pay dearly for Piazzale Loreto's bloodshed.

— Benito Mussolini to the Deputy Head of the Police of the Italian Social Republic, Eugenio Apollonio

== Viale Abruzzi bombing ==
On 8 August 1944, unknown elements carried out an attack with two explosive devices against a German lorry (registration number WM 111092) parked in viale Abruzzi in Milan. In that attack, no German soldier was killed (the driver Heinz Kuhn, who slept in the cockpit, suffered only minor injuries) but it caused the death of six Milanese citizens and the wounding of eleven others. Despite the absence of military victims and a claim, the episode was still used as a pretext for the shooting of the 15 partisans. The attack had different and anomalous characteristics when compared to other partisan attacks, raising suspicion (e.g., in a 1998 court trial), that it was artfully organized by the Germans themselves to justify the subsequent reprisals.

=== Shooting ===
At dawn on 10 August 1944, in Milan, fifteen partisans were taken from the San Vittore prison and taken to Piazzale Loreto, where they were shot by a firing squad made up of fascist militias of the Oberdan group of the «Ettore Muti» legion led by Captain Pasquale Cardella who was acting under the orders of the German command, in particular of the SS captain Theo Saevecke, later known as the executioner of Piazzale Loreto, then commander of the security service (SD) of Milan and its province (AK Mailand).

In the communiqué of the Nazi security command, it is stated that the massacre was carried out for a set of "acts of sabotage" among which the attack on Viale Abruzzi is barely recognizable.

The GAP commander, Giovanni Pesce, always denied that the attack could have been carried out by any partisan unit. Certain anomalous elements have caused some to define the attack as controversial: corporal major Kuhn had parked the vehicle a short distance from a garage in via Natale Battaglia and from the Titanus hotel, both requisitioned by the Wehrmacht and available to Nazi military personnel. Kesselring 's ban, invoked by the communiqué and by the high Nazi hierarchies, provided for the shooting of ten Italians for every German only in the case of Nazi victims. But in the Viale Abruzzi attack, no German soldier was killed: the dead and seriously injured were all Italians.

It is therefore legitimate to assume, as the Military Tribunal of Turin did in the Saevecke trial, that the massacre in Piazzale Loreto was a deliberate act of terrorism which had the strategic aim of crushing popular sympathy for the Resistance in order to avoid any form of collaboration and to guarantee the maximum freedom of movement for the Nazi troops towards the Brenner pass. Theo Saevecke, whose command was at the Albergo Regina & Metropoli in via Silvio Pellico, headquarters of the SS and Gestapo and a well-known place of torture, demanded and nevertheless obtained the summary shooting of fifteen anti-fascists, and he compiled the list himself, as testified by Elena Morgante, employed in the SS office, who was ordered to type it.

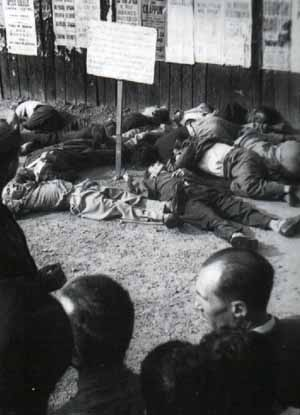
Corpses piled up in the square. The sign defined them "murderers"

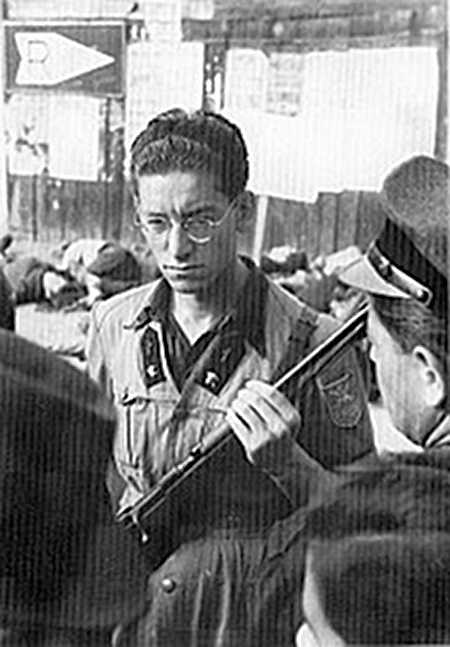
Soldier guarding the exposed corpses

After the shooting - which took place at 06:10 - for the purpose of intimidation, the broken corpses were left exposed under the sun of the hot summer day, covered with flies, until about 20 o'clock. A cartel classified the partisans shot as "murderers". The bodies, guarded by Muti soldiers who also prevented relatives from paying homage to the dead, were publicly vilified and outraged in all ways by the fascists and auxiliaries of the RSI; Moreover, to intimidate the population and remove any support for the Resistance, the fascist militia forced, weapons in hand, the citizens in transit, on foot, by bicycle or on the tram, to attend the «show».

Upon hearing the news, the partisan Don Giovanni Barbareschi went to the archbishop of Milan, Cardinal Alfredo Ildefonso Schuster, begging him to go and impart his blessing to the bodies, but the cardinal asked him to go himself, although still a deacon. He reassembled the piled up corpses as best he could and looked in his pockets for messages that they might have written, in order to deliver them to the families. He managed to perform this work of mercy before a fascist militia chased him away. Three days later he was ordained a priest. Barbareschi then recounted that after having prayed on his knees in front of the bodies, he turned around and saw that all the crowd present had knelt with him. When the following year the corpses of Benito Mussolini, Claretta Petacci and 18 fascist hierarchs were exposed in the same place, Don Barbareschi returned to bless the bodies.

The poet Franco Loi, witness of the tragedy and then living in nearby via Casoretto, affirmed:

There were many corpses on the sidewalks, against the fence, some theater posters, the "Gazetta del Sorriso", signs, bandits! Captured bandits with weapons in hand! Around, people change, the hot sun. When I came to see them it was like a vertigo: shoes, hands, arms, dirty stockings; (...) in my eyes as a child it was an unheard of thing: men lying on sidewalks like garbage and other men, young people dressed in black, who seemed to be on guard with guns!

— Franco Loi, from R. Cicala, Interlinea, Novara, 1995. ISBN 88-86121-56-3., Con la violenza e la pietà. Poesia e resistenza

The execution and the vilification of the corpses deeply impressed public opinion, so much so that the Prefect of Milan and head of the Province Piero Parini in his «Pro memoria urgente per il duce» notes «[...] the method of shooting it had been extremely irregular and contrary to the rules. The wretches had not even had the assistance of the priest, which is not denied even to the most abject murderer. [. . . ] To my remonstrances, the Nazi commanders all responded in the same way: the execution had been an application of Marshal Kesselring's ban [. . . ] The impression in the city remains very strong and hostility towards the Germans has greatly increased. There have also been partial strikes in some factories and there are rumors that one is being prepared tomorrow. [. . . ] I won't hide from you that I feel deeply uncomfortable in my office, since the German way of proceeding is such as to make the task of any authority too difficult and causes a growing aversion on the part of the population towards the Republic».

Following the memorandum, Mussolini communicated to the German ambassador to the RSI, Rudolf Rahn, that the methods used by the German military "were contrary to the feelings of the Italians and offended their natural mildness"; in fact, however, without making a concrete commitment to restore justice. Less than a year later, at dawn on April 29, 1945, in the same square, the corpses of Mussolini, his lover Claretta Petacci and 15 other fascists, were exposed in front of the crowd that had flocked to the news of the Duce's death.

== Perpetrators ==
=== Theodor Saevecke ===
Theo Saevecke, known as the executioner of Piazzale Loreto by the Milanese Resistance, was tried by the Military Tribunal of Turin and was sentenced to life imprisonment on 9 June 1999; however, despite the request of the Italian military judiciary, he was never extradited nor did he ever undergo any trial at home. He died in 2000. Like some other Nazi war criminals, he was drafted into the US intelligence service after the war (code name Cabanio) and later held the important position of deputy head of the security services of the Federal Republic of Germany. In 1963 West Germany had requested information on Saevecke's criminal activity in Milan during the Nazi occupation, to which the Italian authorities replied, after having consulted the file hidden in the closet of shame, with a report from the Ministry of Foreign Affairs addressed to counterpart German Ministry.

== In popular culture ==
=== Martiri di Piazzale Loreto painting ===
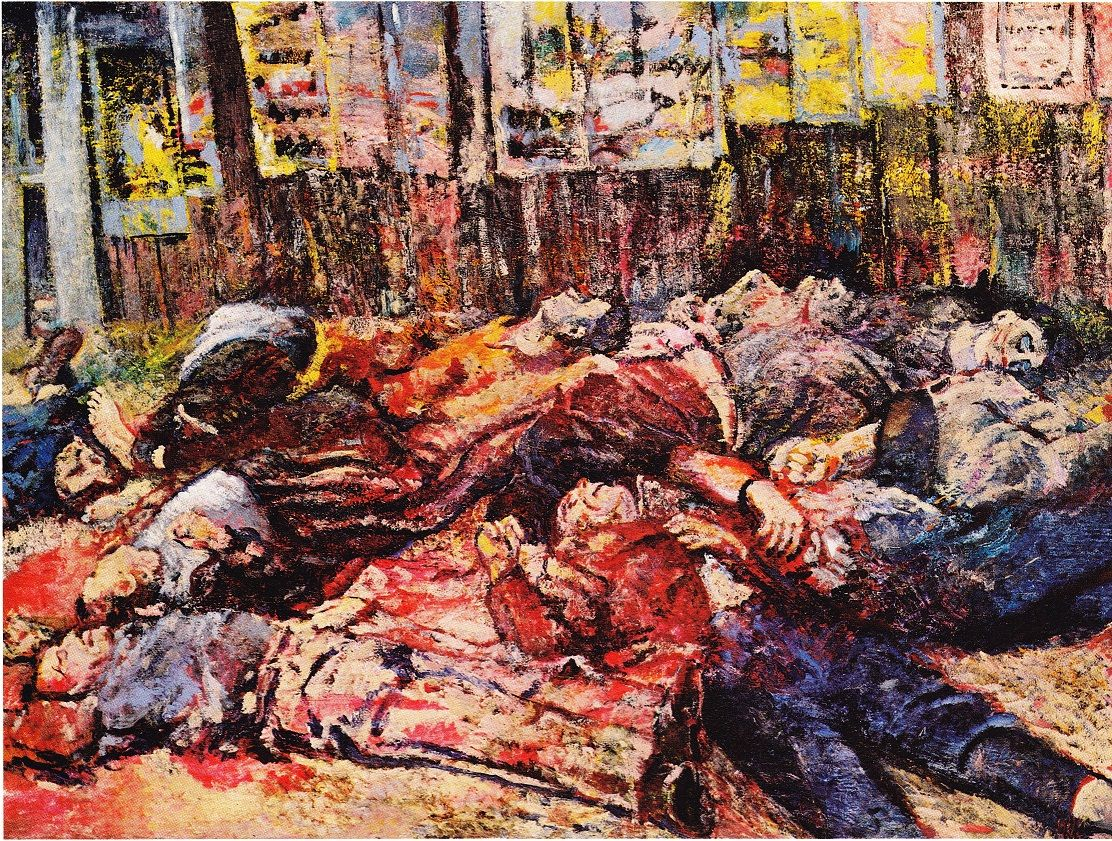
Aligi Sassu, Martiri di Piazzale Loreto o La guerra civile, oil on canvas, 1944, Galleria Nazionale d'Arte Moderna, Rome

Aligi Sassu painted the Martiri di Piazzale Loreto (original title La guerra civile), under the impression of the brutal assassination. The painting of 1944 (oil on canvas 150 x 200 cm) was exhibited for the first time at the 1952 Venice exhibition, the Biennale del realismo, where the art historian Giulio Carlo Argan noticed it and had it acquired by the Galleria Nazionale d'Arte Moderna in Rome, which still exhibits it. Martiri di Piazzale Loreto proposes a custom of Sassu's poetics, that is the dialectic between the rendering of contemporary reality and the actualization of the myth.

The same artist, a partisan engaged together with De Grada, Grosso and Guttuso, in his autobiography "Un grido di colore" (Todaro editore, Lugano, 1998) recalls: "I painted I Martiri di Piazzale Loreto in August 1944, just after seeing the mockery that the rogue republic made of the bodies of our brothers. Yet there was in me, in the fire and anxiety that agitated me, in trying to express what I had seen, a great peace and not hatred, but an immense sadness for the fratricidal struggle. From those bleeding and inert bodies a warning arose: peace, peace".

=== Monument in Piazzale Loreto ===
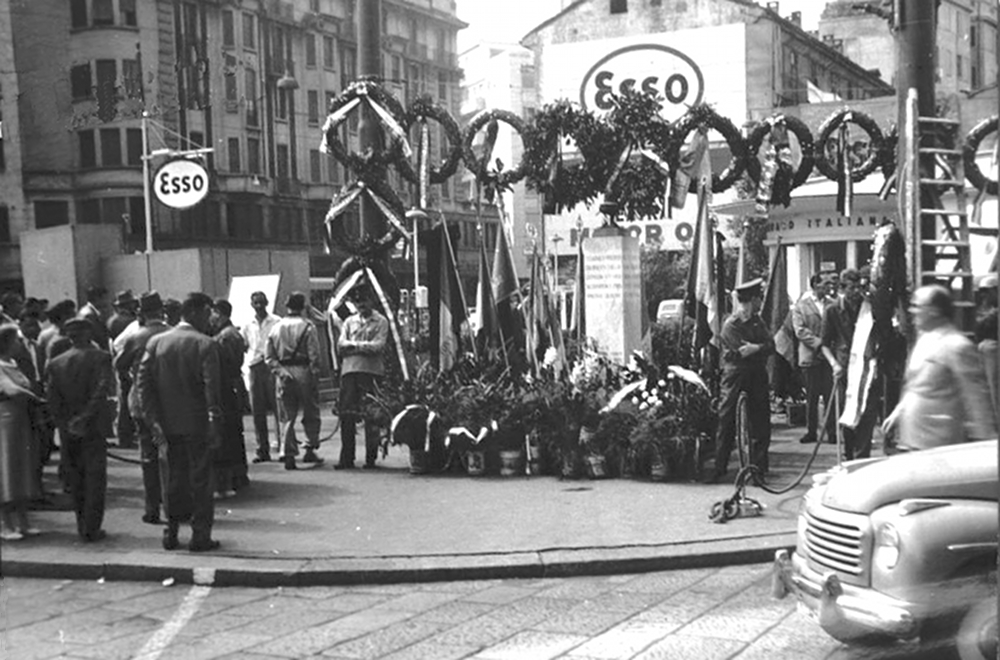
The first memorial stone erected exactly on the site of the massacre. In the background is the Esso station where Mussolini's body was hung.

At the end of the war, a memorial stone was erected on the site of the massacre and in memory of the martyrs who fell there. This memorial stone was replaced by a monument erected in August 1960, the work of the sculptor Giannino Castiglioni (1884-1971), located on the corner between the square and viale Andrea Doria. On the front, the monument bears a bas-relief representing a martyr subjected to execution on the iconography of San Sebastiano, on the back it bears the words "ALTA/L'ILLUMINATA FRONTE/CADDERO NEL NOME/DELLA LIBERTÀ" followed by the list of 15 fallen, the date of the massacre, 10 August 1944 and the symbols of the Italian Republic and the Municipality of Milan.

== See also ==
- Milan
- Piazzale Loreto
- Italian resistance movement
- Italian Social Republic
