= Daniele Turani =

Italian politician

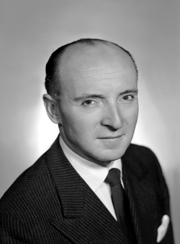
- Daniele Turani in a portrait

Italian Senator from Lombardy
- In office 25 June 1953 – 25 April 1964
- Preceded by: Title jointly held
- Succeeded by: Title jointly held
- Constituency: Treviglio

Personal details
- Born: Daniele Turani; 8 February 1907 Bergamo, Lombardy
- Died: 25 April 1964 (aged 57)
- Party: Christian Democracy
- Profession: Fur trader

Daniele Turani was a member of the Italian Christian Democracy, and was an Italian Senator from Lombardy. He died in office on April 25, 1964.

== Political career ==
Turani obtained a seat in the Italian Senate after Piero Mentasti's retirement. He died in office after two re-elections.

== Professional career ==
When he announced his candidacy for the Italian Senate, Turani served as the president both of Italy's National Leather Institute and National Leather Union. In 1963, Turani served as president of the administrative council for Intertrust, S.A., a Luxembourg-based marketing company owned by Hugh W. Long & Co.

== President of Atalanta BC ==
From 1945 until his death in 1964, Turani served as the president of the football club Atalanta Bergamasca Calcio. During his tenure as president of the club, Atalanta won the 1962-1963 Coppa Italia, which would be the club's first major trophy and the only one they would win until the 2023–24 UEFA Europa League.

== See also ==
- Italian Senate election in Lombardy, 1953

Italian Senate
Preceded by Title jointly held	Italian Senator for Lombardy; 1953–1964	Succeeded by Title jointly held
