= Falck Group =

Falck
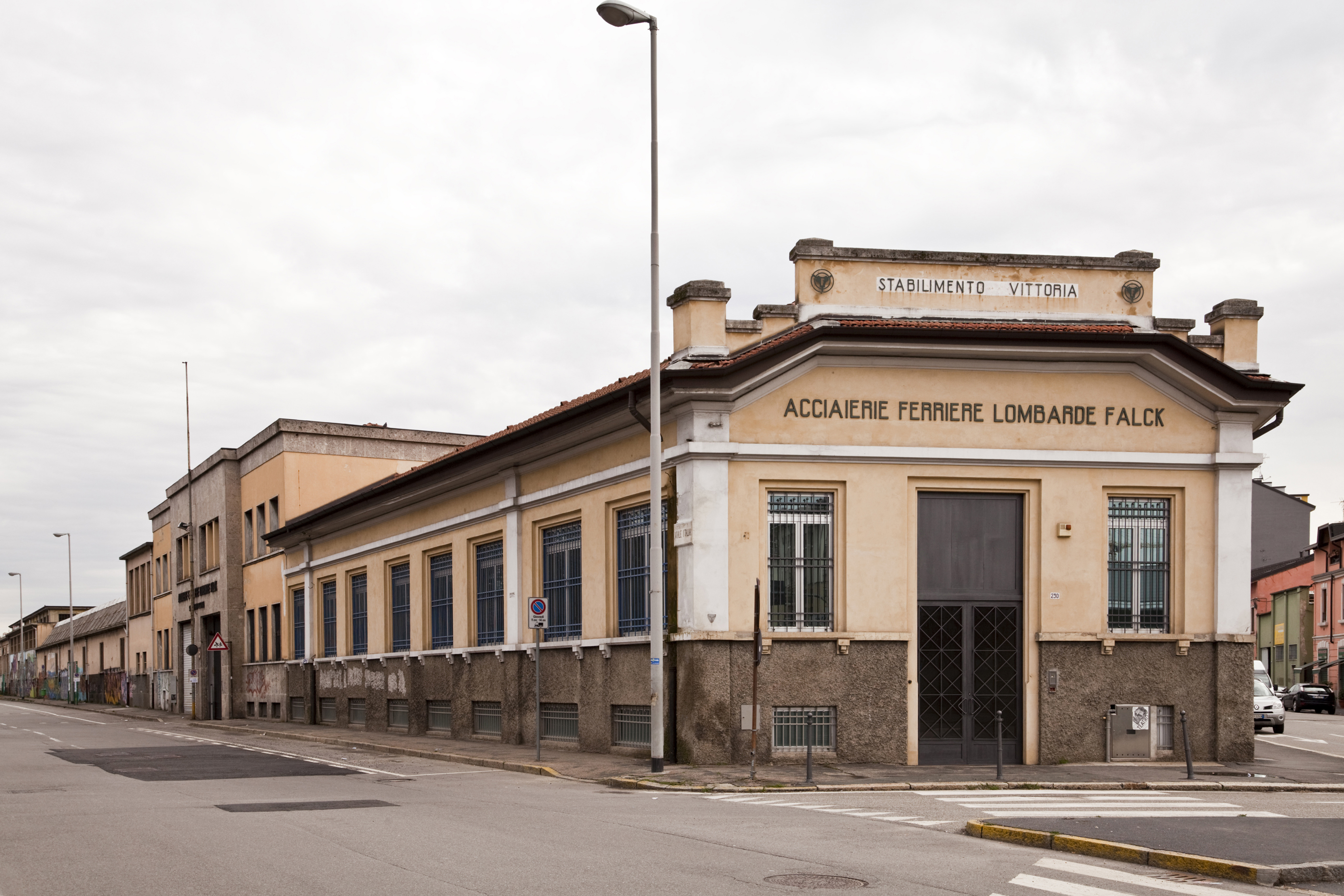
- Entrance of former Falck industries in Sesto San Giovanni
- Formerly: Acciaierie e ferriere lombarde Falck
- Company type: S.p.A. (Public limited company as defined under Italian law)
- Industry: formerly: Ferrous metallurgy latterly: Renewable energy
- Founded: January 26, 1906 in Milan, Italy
- Founder: Giorgio Enrico Falck
- Headquarters: Sesto San Giovanni, Italy
- Key people: Enrico Falck
- Products: formerly: Steels and irons latterly: Wind power, Biomass
- Website: falck.it

Falck Group is an Italian company located in Sesto San Giovanni. It was founded in 1906 and is one of the oldest companies in the steel industry. In the 1990s it turned to the production of energy from renewable sources.

It was founded in 1906 in Milan by Giorgio Enrico Falck under the name Società anonima Acciaierie e Ferriere Lombarde. The first and most important industrial plants were built in Sesto San Giovanni. In 1931 the company changed its name to Acciaiere e Ferriere Lombarde Falck. The company produced steel and related products, both processed and semi-finished, for over seventy years until the crisis in the mid-seventies when the company began to decline. Its last furnaces closed in 1995.

At the end of the nineties the Falck Group, still run by the Falck family, turned to the production of renewable energy, through the subsidiary Falck Renewables.

== See also ==
- Enrico Falck
- History of Steel Industry
- Steel industry in Italy
- History of Sesto San Giovanni
