= Enrico Falck =

Italian entrepreneur and politician

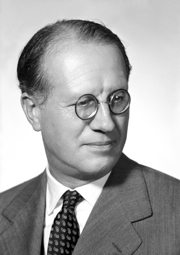

Italian Senator from Lombardy
- In office 8 May 1948 – 4 June 1953
- Preceded by: None
- Succeeded by: Title jointly held
- Constituency: Lecco

Personal details
- Born: Enrico Falck; 21 January 1899 Lecco, Como
- Died: 15 June 1953 (aged 54)
- Party: Christian Democracy
- Profession: Entrepreneur

Enrico Falck (21 January 1899 – 15 June 1953) was an Italian entrepreneur, member of the board of directors of the Falck Industries. He joined the Italian Christian Democracy, and was an Italian Senator from Lombardy.

== Political career ==
In 1934 Falck was named by king Vittorio Emanuele III senator of the kingdom. In 1945 he was expelled from the upper house due to his involvement with fascism. Falck Industries, based in Sesto San Giovanni, was a leader of iron and steel manufacturing, and Enrico was nominated for the Senate by the DC. He did not seek re-election in 1953 in order to follow his private interests, but died almost immediately afterwards.

== See also ==
- Italian Senate election in Lombardy, 1948

== Footnotes ==
Italian Senate
Preceded by None	Italian Senator for Lombardy; 1948–1953	Succeeded by Title jointly held
