= Ercole Marelli =

Italian engineer (1867–1922)

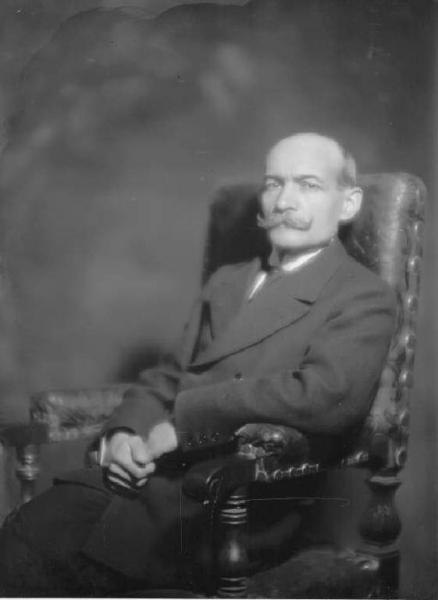
- Ercole Marelli, photo by Emilio Sommariva (1919)
- Born: May 19, 1867; Milan
- Died: August 28, 1922 (aged 55); Tremezzina

Ercole Marelli (Milan, 19 May 1867 – Tremezzina, 28 August 1922) was an Italian engineer and entrepreneur.

== Biography ==
Marelli was born in Milan on May 19, 1867, the son of a craftsman from the Como area. At fifteen he began working as an apprentice at a mechanical workshop. In 1885 he was presented to Bartolomeo Cabella, director of the Italian Brown Boveri Tecnomasio and hired as a mechanic for measuring instruments and for electrical work applied to lighting. In October 1888 he went to Asunción in Paraguay, just twenty years old, where he assembled and operated an electrical system for the Concha Sociedad plant.

== Foundation of Ercole Marelli ==
In 1891, when he returned to Italy, he founded a modest workshop of electrical appliances in the centre of Milan, assisted by a worker; they manufactured apparatus of physics and geodesy, electric machines for school toilets, batteries, accumulators and electro-medical devices. From 1898 it also began to trade AC motors.

== Sesto San Giovanni plant ==
On 28 February 1900 it became a limited partnership. In December 1905 it opened a plant in Sesto San Giovanni, producing small electric motors, centrifugal pumps and transformers.

== Patents for magnetos ==
In 1915, the "Società Anonima Ercole Marelli" started the first Italian experiments in the field of magnetos for petrol engines. In 1916, Ercole Marelli registered the first patent related to magnetos, perfecting the innovation in 1917, and then again with a "complete" patent towards the end of 1918.

== Foundation of Magneti Marelli ==
In 1919 by Ercole Marelli he broke off a production department of automobile magnetos, which later became in turn the company Magneti Marelli. The joint venture established equal shares of capital, giving the presidency and the technical management, as well as the commercial one to Marelli. The ownership was then entrusted to the husband of his daughter, Bruno Antonio Quintavalle, who remained until 1967. In that year the entire stock package passed to Fiat and his brother Umberto Quintavalle.

== Archive ==
The documentation produced by Ercole Marelli during his entrepreneurial activity is conserved in part at the ISEC Foundation [2] of Sesto San Giovanni, in the Ercole Marelli Fund (chronological details: 1896–1986), and partly at the Magneti Marelli Historical Archives (chronological details: 1919–2000). The latter collects an extremely important documentary heritage for the history of industry in the fields of motor vehicles, telecommunications, radio and television, produced by the company in over ninety years of activity. The mission of the Historical Archive consists in collecting, conserving and enhancing the historical memory of Magneti Marelli and the brands that make it up, among which Weber and Solex, Veglia Borletti and Jaeger, Carello and Siem stand out. The preserved historical material covers an era that goes from the end of the 19th century to 2000 and is made up of a sector related to image and communication, with about 20,000 images, 500 films and over 2000 pieces among business magazines, brochures, advertisements and press reviews; a technical sector with over 1000 product catalogs, manuals and technical drawings; reports and company balance sheets.

== See also ==
- History of Sesto San Giovanni
