= Attilio Terragni =

Italian politician

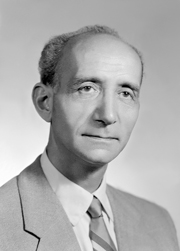

Italian Senator from Lombardy
- In office 25 June 1953 – 14 February 1958
- Preceded by: Title jointly held
- Succeeded by: Title jointly held
- Constituency: Como

Personal details
- Born: Attilio Terragni; 1 April 1896 Milan, Lombardy
- Died: 14 February 1958 (aged 61)
- Party: Monarchist National Party

Attilio Terragni was a member of the rightist Monarchist National Party, and was the sole Italian Senator from Lombardy belonging to this party. He died in office in 1958. He was an architect by training and brother of Giuseppe Terragni.

== See also ==
- Italian Senate election in Lombardy, 1953

Italian Senate
Preceded by Title jointly held	Italian Senator for Lombardy; 1953–1958	Succeeded by Title jointly held
