= Theo Saevecke =

German SS officer (1911-2000)

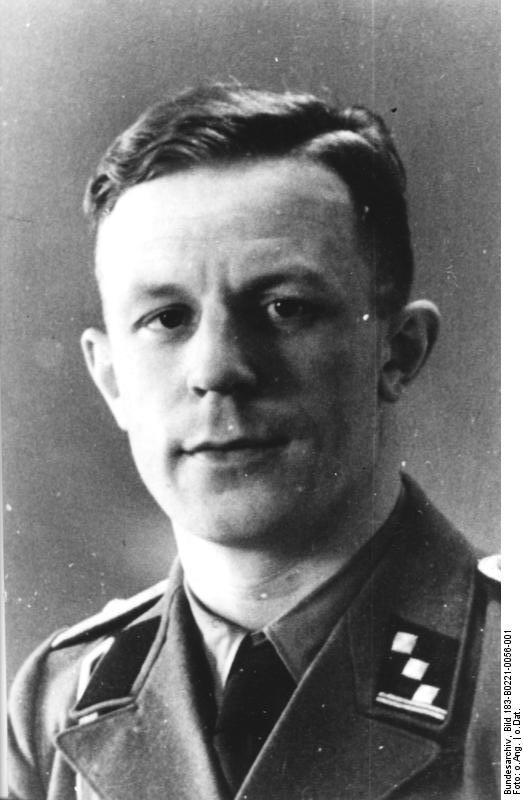
- Born: 22 March 1911; Hamburg, German Empire
- Died: 16 December 2000 (aged 89) Dissen, Germany
- Allegiance: Nazi Germany
- Branch: SS: Sicherheitsdienst, Einsatzgruppe; Gestapo
- Service years: 1938—1945
- Rank: Hauptsturmführer

Theodor Emil Saevecke (22 March 1911 – 16 December 2000) was an SS officer and perpetrator of the Holocaust in Poland and the Holocaust in Italy.

== Biography ==
In 1926, he was a member of the Freikorps, fighting against both the Weimar Republic and communists. On 1 February 1929, Saevecke became a member of the NSDAP (Nazi Party) (member no. 112,407). In 1938 he became a member of the Schutzstaffel (SS) (member no. 396,401). After the war in Europe started, he was a member of the mobile SS death squad, Einsatzgruppen IV in Poland through 1940. Later he was promoted to the rank of SS-Hauptsturmführer and served in the SS-Sicherheitsdienst (SD; Security Service) in Libya and Tunisia between 1942 and 1943, under Walter Rauff. Between 1943 and 1945, Saevecke was head of the Gestapo and the Italian fascist police in Milan. During his time he was responsible for the deportation of at least 700 Italian Jews to extermination camps.

After the war, in 1962, while a Kriminalrat at Sicherungsgruppe Bonn, he led a police raid on the Spiegel scandal. From 1947 on he worked for the CIA. The responsibility for his case was moved from American to British side and back and he was never accused of anything. A group of historians therefore concluded, he was under protection of American intelligence service by then (T. Naftali: The CIA and Eichmann's Associates. 2005, p. 356).

Protected through his connections in post-war Germany, Saevecke was sentenced in absentia in Turin in 1999 to life imprisonment for his involvement in the execution of hostages in Milan in August 1944 but never extradited to Italy.

Saevecke died on 16 December 2000.
