= Rosati Windows =

Rosati Windows, founded by Mike Rosati in 2000, manufactures and installs replacement windows and doors from its Columbus, Ohio factory. It is part of the Rosati Windows Family of Companies, which also includes Rooms of Distinction, builder of custom room additions, conservatories, wine rooms, and finished basements, and The Fix-It Crew, provider of maintenance and repair services for home and business owners.

Rosati Windows produces vinyl replacement windows, windows that are wood on the inside and vinyl on the outside, both available in custom exterior color options, sliding glass doors, and customizable fiberglass entry doors.
