= Carlo Rosati =

Italian mathematician (1876–1929)

Carlo Rosati (Livorno, 24 April 1876 – Pisa, 19 August 1929) was an Italian mathematician working on algebraic geometry who introduced the Rosati involution.
