= Rosati involution =

Group theoretic operation

In mathematics, a Rosati involution, named after Carlo Rosati, is an involution of the rational endomorphism ring of an abelian variety induced by a polarisation.

Let $A$ be an abelian variety, let $\hat{A} = \mathrm{Pic}^0(A)$ be the dual abelian variety, and for $a\in A$, let $T_a:A\to A$ be the translation-by-$a$ map, $T_a(x)=x+a$. Then each divisor $D$ on $A$ defines a map $\phi_D:A\to\hat A$ via $\phi_D(a)=[T_a^*D-D]$. The map $\phi_D$ is a polarisation if $D$ is ample. The Rosati involution of $\mathrm{End}(A)\otimes\mathbb{Q}$ relative to the polarisation $\phi_D$ sends a map $\psi\in\mathrm{End}(A)\otimes\mathbb{Q}$ to the map $\psi'=\phi_D^{-1}\circ\hat\psi\circ\phi_D$, where $\hat\psi:\hat A\to\hat A$ is the dual map induced by the action of $\psi^*$ on $\mathrm{Pic}(A)$.

Let $\mathrm{NS}(A)$ denote the Néron–Severi group of $A$. The polarisation $\phi_D$ also induces an inclusion $\Phi:\mathrm{NS}(A)\otimes\mathbb{Q}\to\mathrm{End}(A)\otimes\mathbb{Q}$ via $\Phi_E=\phi_D^{-1}\circ\phi_E$. The image of $\Phi$ is equal to $\{\psi\in\mathrm{End}(A)\otimes\mathbb{Q}:\psi'=\psi\}$, i.e., the set of endomorphisms fixed by the Rosati involution. The operation $E\star F=\frac12\Phi^{-1}(\Phi_E\circ\Phi_F+\Phi_F\circ\Phi_E)$ then gives $\mathrm{NS}(A)\otimes\mathbb{Q}$ the structure of a formally real Jordan algebra.
