= Mariano Rosati =

Italian Christian Democracy

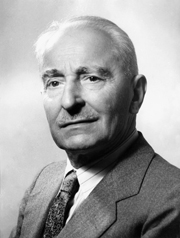

Italian Senator from Lombardy
- In office May 8, 1948 – June 24, 1953
- Preceded by: None
- Succeeded by: Title jointly held
- Constituency: Como

Personal details
- Born: Mariano Rosati; December 12, 1869 Como, Lombardy
- Party: Christian Democracy
- Profession: Lawyer

Mariano Rosati was a member of the Italian Christian Democracy, and was an Italian Senator from Lombardy. He did not seek for re-election in 1953.

His daughter Anna Maria Rosati, born on May 4, 1905, is still alive and is therefore among the supercentenarians.

== Political career ==
Rosati was the chairman of the association of the lawyers of the Province of Como. In 1948 he was nominated for the Senate by the DC despite not being a member of the party, but he joined it after his victory. Not being a politician, he retired in 1953.

== See also ==
- Italian Senate election in Lombardy, 1948

== Footnotes ==
Italian Senate
Preceded by None	Italian Senator for Lombardy; 1948–1963	Succeeded by Title jointly held
