= Angelo Cemmi =

Italian politician

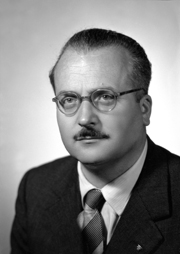

Italian Senator from Lombardy
- In office 8 May 1948 – 15 May 1963
- Preceded by: None
- Succeeded by: Title jointly held
- Constituency: Breno

Personal details
- Born: Angelo Cemmi; 24 March 1908 Darfo, Brescia
- Party: Christian Democracy
- Profession: Solicitor

Angelo Cemmi was a member of the Italian Christian Democracy party, and was an Italian Senator from Lombardy. He retired in 1963.

== Political career ==
Cemmi, mayor of Darfo in office, entered in the Italian Senate in 1948. He retired after two re-elections.

== See also ==
- Italian Senate election in Lombardy, 1948

== Footnotes ==
Italian Senate
| Preceded by None | Italian Senator for Lombardy; 1948–1963 | Succeeded by Title jointly held |
