= Angelo Buizza =

Italian politician

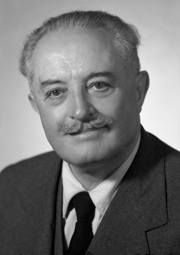

Italian Senator from Lombardy
- In office 8 May 1948 – 15 May 1963
- Preceded by: None
- Succeeded by: Title jointly held
- Constituency: Brescia

Personal details
- Born: Angelo Buizza; 6 October 1885 Flero, Brescia
- Party: Christian Democracy
- Profession: Engineer

Angelo Buizza (6 October 1885 - 18 January 1971) was a member of the Italian Christian Democracy, and was an Italian Senator from Lombardy. He retired in 1963.

== Political career ==
Buizza won elective office in three consecutive campaigns between 1948 and 1958. He worked in the construction of the Motorway Brescia-Padova.

== See also ==
- Italian Senate election in Lombardy, 1948

Italian Senate
Preceded by Title jointly held	Italian Senator for Lombardy; 1948–1963	Succeeded by Title jointly held
