= Piero Mentasti =

Italian politician (1897–1958)

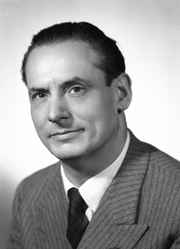

Italian Senator from Lombardy
- In office 8 May 1948 – 24 June 1953
- Preceded by: None
- Succeeded by: Title jointly held
- Constituency: Treviglio

Personal details
- Born: Piero Mentasti; 15 May 1897 Treviglio, Bergamo
- Died: 24 September 1958 (aged 61)
- Party: Christian Democracy
- Profession: Tax advisor

Piero Mentasti (15 May 1897 – 24 September 1958) was a member of the Italian Christian Democracy, and was an Italian Senator from Lombardy. He did not seek re-election in 1953. 35 of his essays on liberalism are compiled in On Liberal Revolution.

== Political career ==
Mentasti was appointed to the Provisional National Council of Italy in 1945, and he was elected to the Constituent Assembly in 1946. He obtained the election to the Italian Senate in 1948, serving until 1953.

== Role in the Senate ==
=== Committee assignments ===
- Committee on Trade and Industry
  - Legislature I

=== Electoral history ===
1948 election for the Italian Senate

- Direct mandate for Treviglio (72.7%) obtaining the landslide victory required by law (more than 2/3 of votes)

== See also ==
- Italian Senate election in Lombardy, 1948

== Footnotes ==
Italian Senate
Preceded by None	Italian Senator for Lombardy; 1948–1953; Direct mandate for Treviglio 1948–1953	Succeeded by Title jointly held
