= Cristoforo Pezzini =

Italian politician (1892–1987)

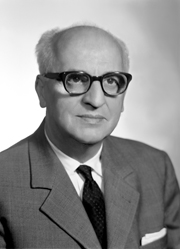

Italian Senator from Lombardy
- In office 8 May 1948 – 4 June 1968
- Preceded by: None
- Succeeded by: Title jointly held
- Constituency: Bergamo

Personal details
- Born: Cristoforo Pezzini; 7 March 1892 Iglesias, Cagliari
- Died: 7 February 1987 (aged 94)
- Party: Christian Democracy
- Profession: Barrister

Cristoforo Pezzini (7 March 1892 – 7 February 1987) was a member of the Italian Christian Democracy, and was an Italian Senator from Lombardy. He did not seek re-election in 1968.

== Political career ==
City councillor of Bergamo and member of the board of directors of Cariplo Foundation, Pezzini obtained four consecutive elections to the Italian Senate, serving from 1948 to 1968.

== Personal life ==
Pezzini was born in Sardinia, but he spent his life as a barrister in Lombardy.

== Role in the Senate ==
=== Committee assignments ===
- Committee on Work and Welfare
  - Legislature I
- Special Committee on Governmental Decrees
  - Legislature I

=== Electoral history ===
1948 election for the Italian Senate

- Direct mandate for Bergamo (73.5%) obtaining the landslide victory required by law (more than 2/3 of votes)

== See also ==
- Italian Senate election in Lombardy, 1948

== Footnotes ==
Italian Senate
Preceded by None	Italian Senator for Lombardy; 1948–1968; Direct mandate for Bergamo 1948–1953	Succeeded by Title jointly held
