= Clusone =

- Comune
- Città di Clusone
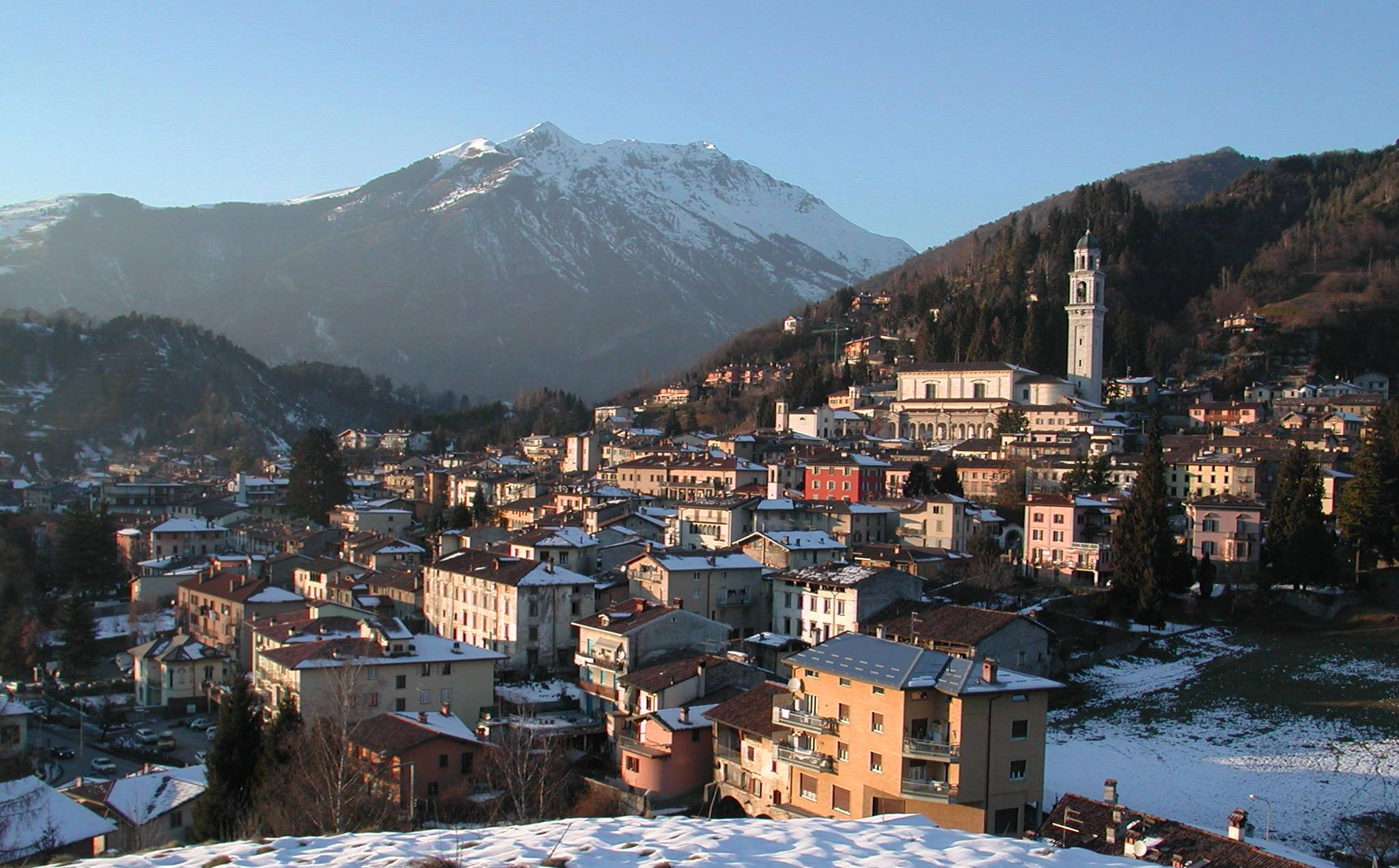
- Panorama of the town in winter

- Coat of arms

- Location within Italy Location within Lombardy
- Coordinates: 45°53′N 9°57′E
- Country: Italy
- Region: Lombardy
- Province: Bergamo (BG)
- Frazioni: Fiorine

Government
  - Mayor: Massimo Morstabilini (Civic)

Area
  - Total: 25 km^{2} (9.7 sq mi)
- Elevation: 647 m (2,123 ft)

Population (31 December 2024)
  - Total: 8,600
  - Density: 340/km^{2} (890/sq mi)
- Demonym: Clusonesi
- Time zone: UTC+1 (CET)
  - Summer (DST): UTC+2 (CEST)
- Postal code: 24023
- Dialing code: 0346
- Patron saint: Saint Blaise e Saint John the Baptist
- Saint day: February 3 and June 24
- Website: Official website

Clusone (Bergamasque: Clüsù) is an Italian town and comune in the province of Bergamo, Lombardy, Italy. Located in the Val Seriana, it received the honorary title of city on 15 May 1957 with a presidential decree which ratified a Napoleon's promise of the year 1801. It is one of I Borghi più belli d'Italia ("The most beautiful villages of Italy").

== Geography and climate ==
Clusone is part of the Serio Valley, even though from an orographic point of view the plateau of Clusone, from glacial origin, belongs in part to the basin of Oglio.

The climate of Clusone is temperate: in the winter, temperatures can fall to −10 °C (14 °F) and in summer may reach a maximum of 30 °C (86 °F).

== History ==
The city is of ancient origins, probably dating back to the first settlement of Orobii, which was founded around 1300 BC.

Later, in the Roman period, the village became a center of greater importance in the entire district, including the construction of fortifications. The city's name originates from this period and may come from the Latin word clausus, indicating an enclosed space surrounded by mountains.

The following centuries saw the end of Roman domination and the subsequent arrival of the Lombards, who were in turn followed by the Franks. The first written document which mentions Clusone dates from 774, in a deed that recorded the grant of the nucleus of the rocca (fortress) by Charlemagne to the monks of Saint Martin of Tours. The fortress grew considerably in medieval times, so as to assume the appearance of a real castle, with walls and towers for defensive purposes. A branch of the noble Aliprandi family of Milan, that assumed the surname Fanzago in place of that original, moved to Clusone at the end of the 14th century.

The period under the Republic of Venice (from the late 15th century) represented the period of maximum artistic, cultural and commercial development for Clusone. Clusone shared its fate with Venice until the treaty of Campoformio when it joined the Cisalpine Republic. Under the Austrian rule as part of the Lombardy-Venetia, Clusone became the chief city of a district of the province of Bergamo.

On November 12, 1801, it was awarded the title of city. This title was reconfirmed on May 15, 1957, by the Italian Republic.

== Main sights ==
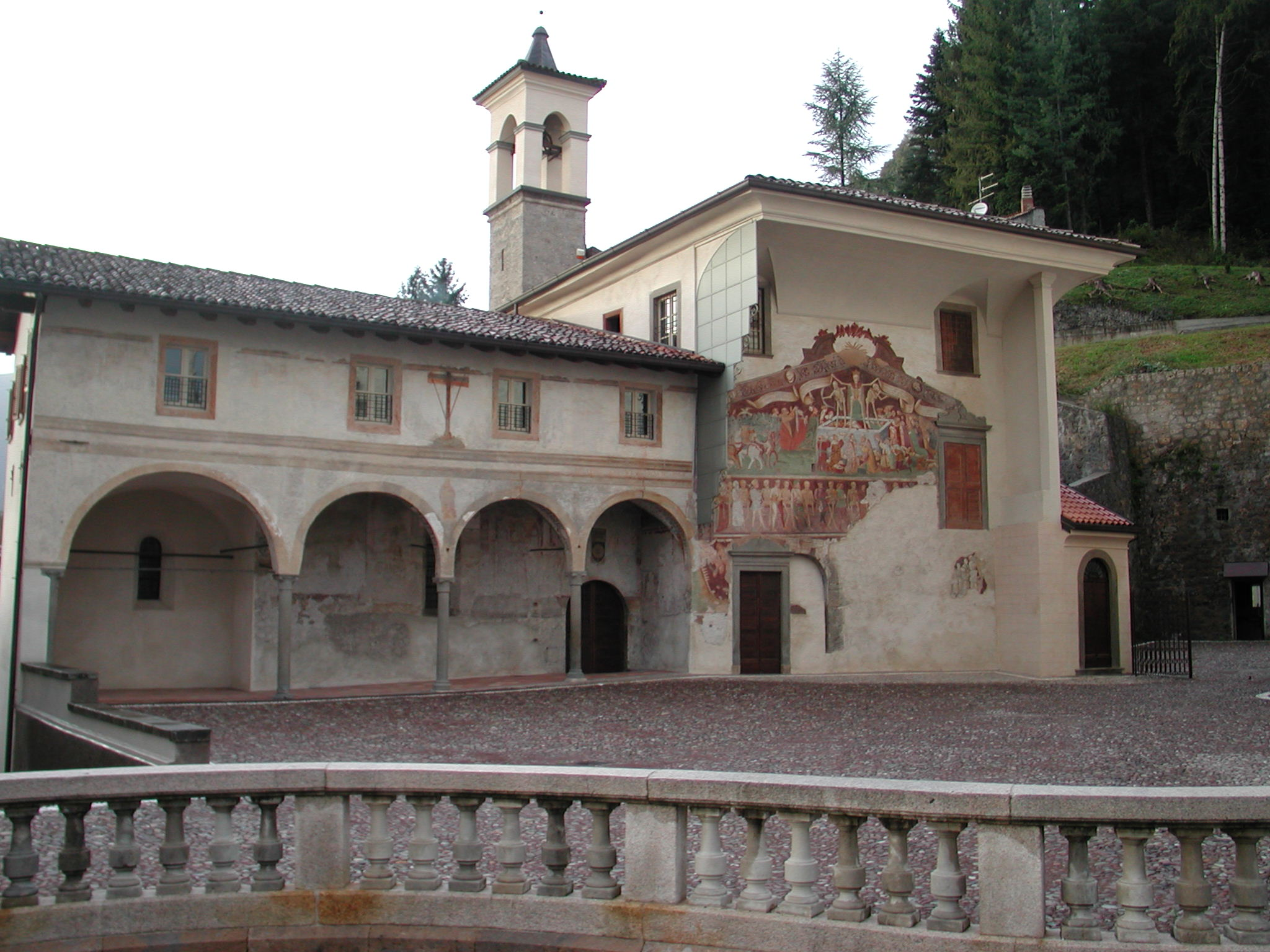
Oratorio dei Disciplini

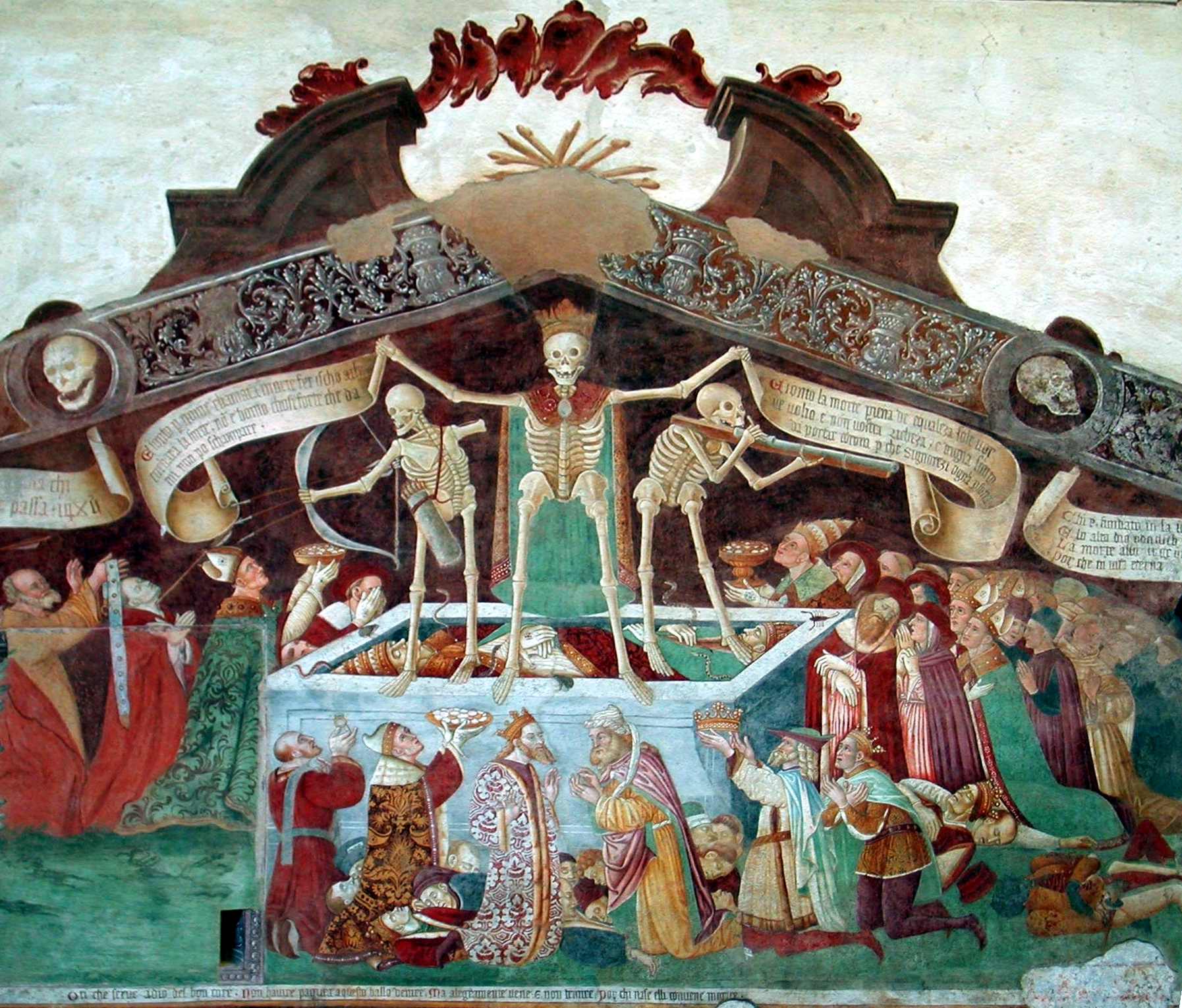
The fresco of the Triumph of Death

- Piazza della Rocca. Until the 19th century, the city was surrounded by walls, and there is documented evidence that in more distant times it was equipped with a fortress which still remains precisely marked out in the Piazza della Rocca.
- Basilica of Santa Maria Assunta (18th century), whose high bell tower is visible from the entire valley.
- Oratorio dei Disciplini. In front of the facade of the basilica is the Oratory of Disciplini, which has a fresco on the facade from the 15th century with the Triumph of Death on top and a macabre dance of great interest in the lower register. Outside of the "Oratorio dei Disciplini" is a fresco of the Triumph of Death painted by Giacomo Borlone de Buschis in 1485. It portrays a triumphant Death, personified as a living skeleton with a cloak and a crown. At her feet are the bodies of a pope and an emperor, surrounded by snakes, frogs and scorpions. She stands on a sepulchre around which figures of a cardinal, a bishop, a king and a philosopher are offering her gifts. She is flanked by two skeletons who fire against other characters at the side, one with a bow and another, on the right, with an early arquebus.
- Town hall, with a façade covered with late-Gothic frescoes and with the clock tower, a work by Pietro Fanzago.
- Church and the Court of Sant'Anna.
- Church of Heaven (15th century), containing a painting by Marco Richiedei, which is located near Piazza Uccelli.
- Church of San Defendente (also from the 15th century).
- Fogaccia Palace, built in the 17th century, with large halls that exhibit valuable paintings (including those of the Clusonesi Carpinoni Domenico and Antonio Cifrondi) and frescoes by the painter Francesco Paglia (between the seventeenth and eighteenth centuries).

== Twin towns and sister cities ==
Clusone is twinned with:

- Le Raincy, France
