= Lake Como =

Lake in Lombardy, Italy

- Lago di Como (Italian); Lagh de Comm (Lombard)
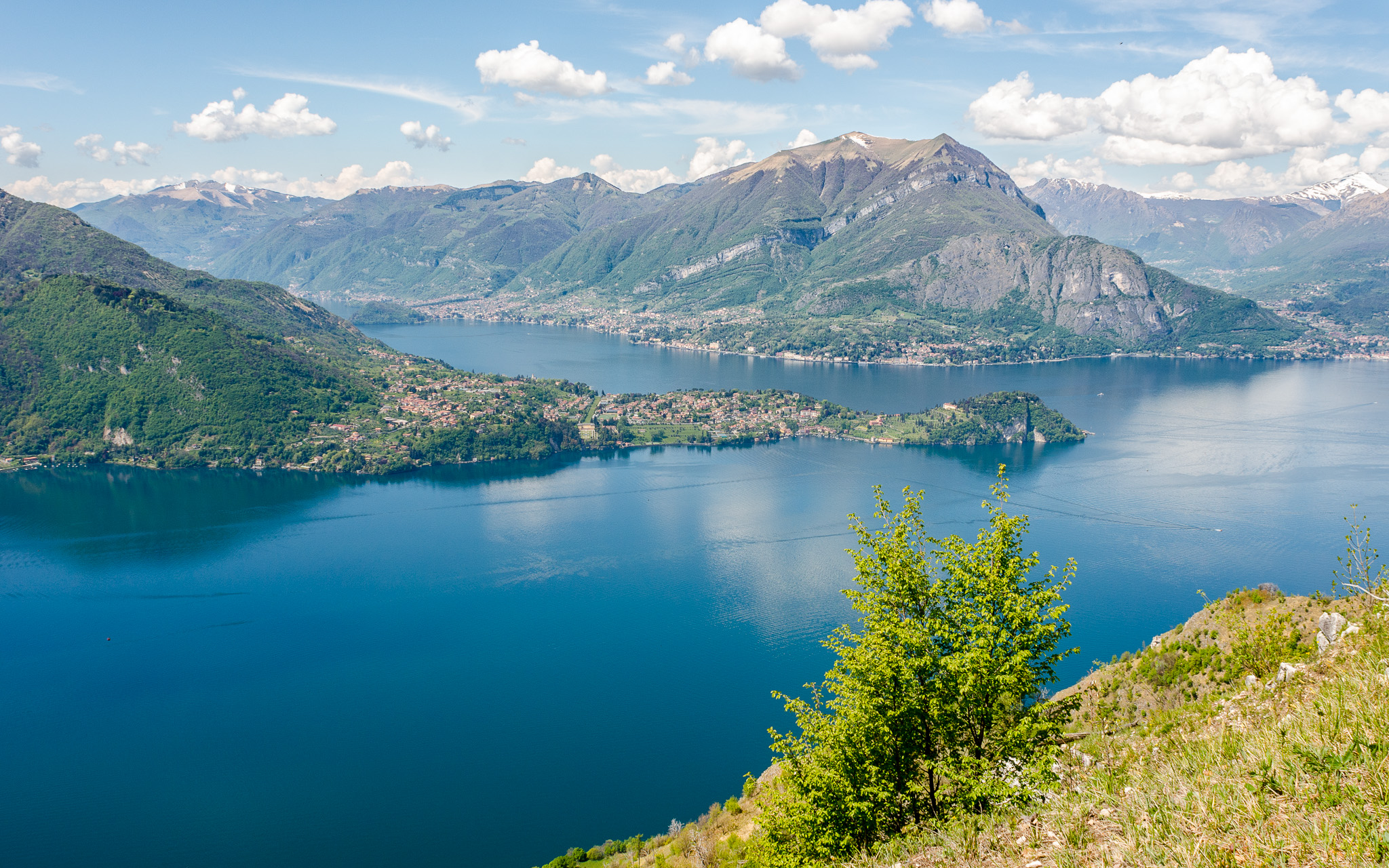
- Panoramic view of Lake Como with the Alps and Bellagio

- Location within Alps Location within Italy Location within Lombardy

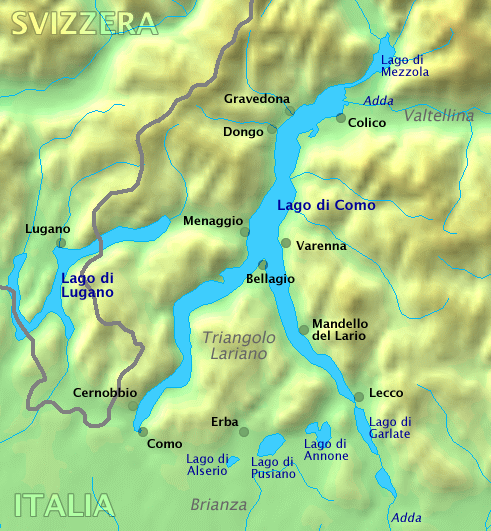
- Bathymetric map
- Location: Lombardy, Italy
- Coordinates: 46°00′N 9°16′E
- Type: Glacial lake
- Primary inflows: Adda, Mera
- Primary outflows: Adda
- Catchment area: 4,509 km^{2} (1,741 sq mi)
- Basin countries: Italy, Switzerland
- Max. length: 46 km (29 mi)
- Max. width: 4.5 km (2.8 mi)
- Surface area: 146 km^{2} (56 sq mi)
- Average depth: 154 m (505 ft)
- Max. depth: 425 m (1,394 ft)
- Water volume: 22.5 km^{3} (18.2 million acre⋅ft)
- Residence time: 5.5 years
- Shore length^{1}: 160 km (99 mi)
- Surface elevation: 198 m (650 ft)
- Islands: Isola Comacina
- Settlements: Como, Lecco (see section)
- ^{1} Shore length is not a well-defined measure.

Lake Como, (Note: Italian: Lago di Como [ˈlaːɡo di ˈkɔːmo], locally [- ˈkoːmo]; Western Lombard: Lagh de Comm [ˈlɑː‿dːe ˈkɔm], Cómm [- ˈkom] or Cùmm [- ˈkum].) also known as Lario, (Note: Italian: [ˈlaːrjo]; after the Latin: Larius Lacus.) is a lake of glacial origin in Lombardy, Italy. It has an area of 146 km^{2} (56 sq mi), making it the third-largest lake in Italy, after Lake Garda and Lake Maggiore. At over 400 metres (1,300 ft) deep, it is one of the deepest lakes in Europe. Its characteristic "Y" shape resulted from the movement of the ancient Adda glacier, which was diverted by the mountainous terrain and carved the three branches.

Located at the foot of the Alps, Lake Como has been a popular retreat for aristocracy and the wealthy since Roman times, and a major tourist attraction with many artistic and cultural gems. The homonymous city was named Novum Comum by consul Julius Caesar in 59 BC. Its shores are dotted with numerous villas and palaces, such as Villa Olmo, Villa Serbelloni, and Villa Carlotta, known for their historic architecture and elaborate gardens. The mild, humid climate, influenced by the lake, supports a diverse range of subtropical plants as well as traditional Mediterranean crops like olives. The surrounding mountains host typical Alpine flora and fauna. A significant religious site is the Sacro Monte di Ossuccio, a UNESCO World Heritage Site.

Lake Como's strategic location facilitated trade during the Roman era and subsequent periods, but also made it a site of conflict through the Middle Ages and Renaissance. The area became renowned for its silk industry in the 19th and 20th centuries, contributing to the region's prosperity. Today, the economy relies heavily on tourism, manufacturing, and craftsmanship. However, the lake's popularity has led to significant challenges related to overtourism, impacting local infrastructure, environment, and communities. Lake Como remains an important cultural reference, featuring in literature, film, and music.

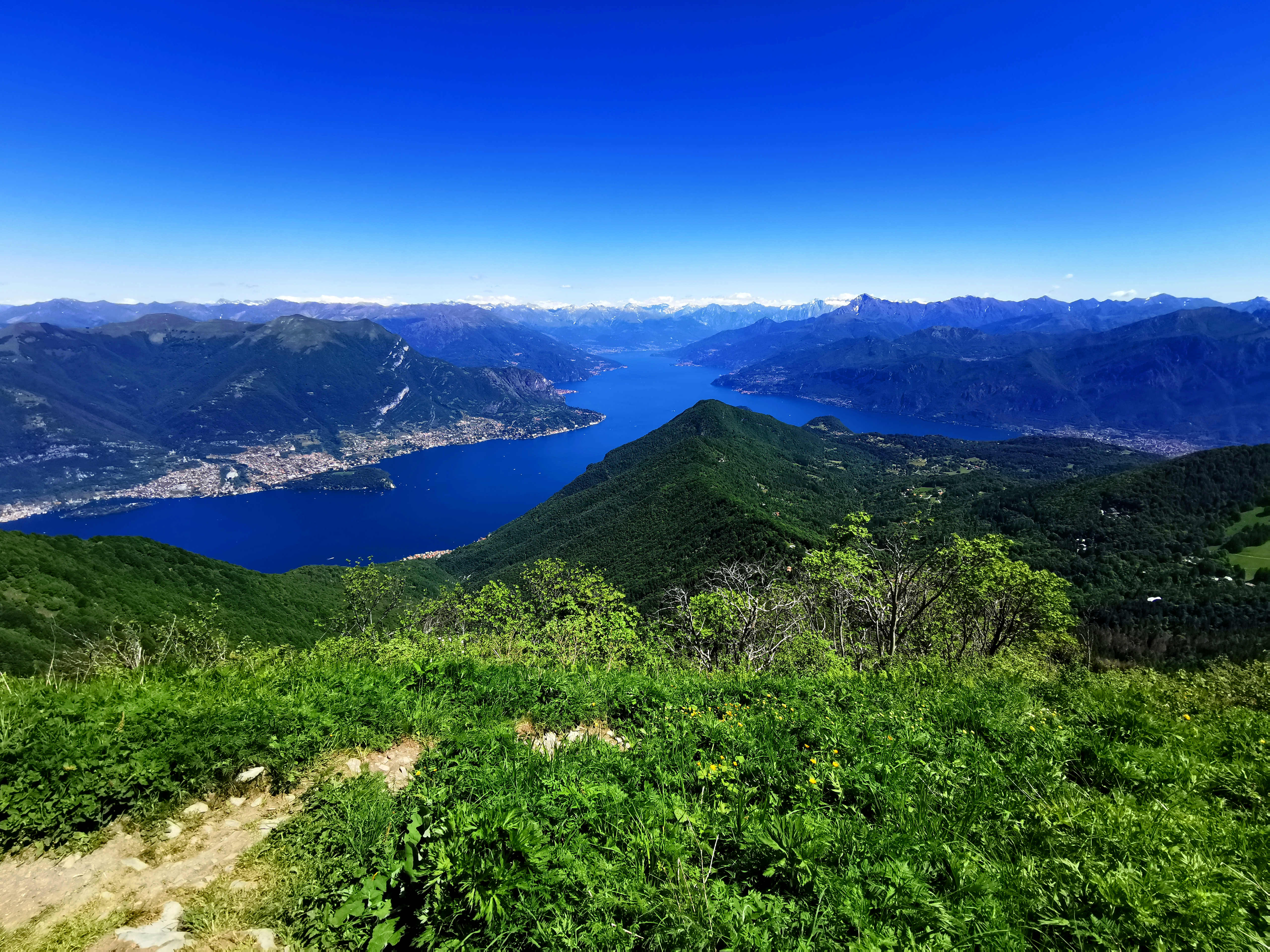
Lake Como from Monte San Primo

== Etymology and nomenclature ==
The lake's ancient Latin name was Larius Lacus. William Smith suggests the name Larius is derived from a pre-Roman root *lar- meaning "hollow place". Lacus means "lake".

During the Middle Ages, the name Lario continued to appear, particularly in official and ecclesiastical documents, sometimes rendered as Lago di Lario in local chronicles. However, starting in late antiquity, the name linked to the principal city, Como (Latin: Comum), gradually gained prominence, especially in everyday and commercial use. This alternative name, Lacus Comacinus or Comacenus (Lake of Como), is found in sources like the Antonine Itinerary and works by Paul the Deacon.

The Renaissance saw a resurgence of interest in the classical name Lario among scholars and cartographers, fuelled by the rediscovery of ancient texts. Maps from this era often displayed both Lago di Lario and Lago di Como, reflecting the dual naming convention and a growing appreciation for the region's history.

Today, while Lario persists in cultural, literary, and historical references, and survives in the names of several lakeside towns (such as Gera Lario, Pognana Lario, and Mandello del Lario), the name most commonly used by Italians and recognized internationally, particularly within the tourism sector, is Lago di Como.

== Geography and geology ==
Lake Como is situated in the Lombardy region of Northern Italy, at the southern end of the Alps, about 45 km north of Milan. Geologically, it lies within the Southern Alps, specifically the Lombardic Basin, an area shaped by a complex history of tectonic activity and surface processes. The region experienced significant rifting during the Mesozoic Era followed by compressional forces during the Alpine orogeny in the Cenozoic Era, related to the collision of the African and Eurasian plates. This compression phase, particularly activity along major fault systems near the Periadriatic Seam (like the Insubric Line), influenced the landscape's structure. The lake basin is primarily carved into Mesozoic carbonate rocks (limestones and marls such as the Moltrasio Limestone) overlying a deeper crystalline basement. Later Cenozoic sediments, notably the Gonfolite Group (Oligocene-Miocene), represent deposits from large submarine fans fed by rivers eroding the nascent Alps.

While often described simply as a glacial lake, Lake Como's basin results from combined fluvial erosion and deep glacial scouring acting upon a pre-existing, structurally controlled valley network. A crucial pre-conditioning event was the Messinian salinity crisis in the late Miocene (around 5.96–5.33 million years ago), when the Mediterranean Sea nearly dried up. This caused Alpine rivers, like the paleo-Adda, to carve extremely deep canyons into the landscape, well below current sea level, as they adjusted to the dramatically lowered base level. These canyons were subsequently partially filled with sediments during the Zanclean flood and Pliocene epoch, but the deeply incised valley system persisted.

During the Quaternary Period's repeated glaciations, large glaciers originating mainly from the Adda valley flowed southwards, following and intensely modifying this pre-existing river valley system. These powerful glaciers significantly widened the valleys into a characteristic U-shape and eroded the basin much deeper than the previous river canyons, creating the lake's remarkable depth, over 400 metres (1,300 ft), and overdeepening—its bottom lies over 200 metres (660 ft) below sea level.

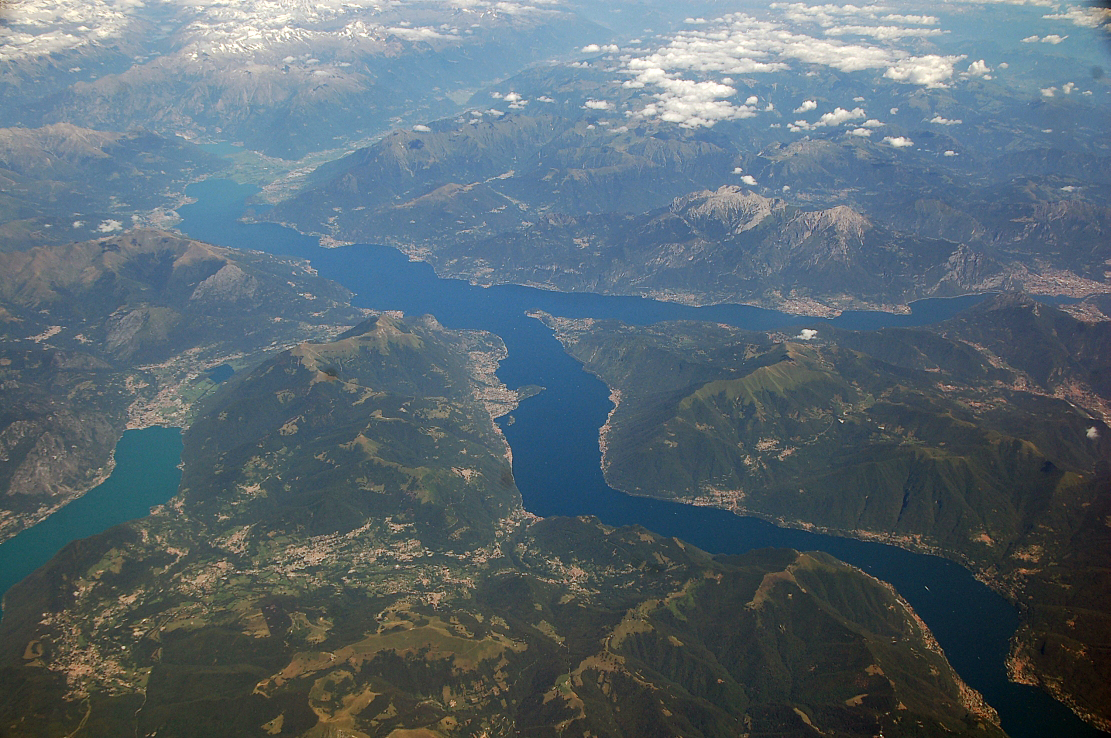
Aerial photograph showing Lake Como's characteristic three-branched shape, with the Alps to the north

Lake Como's distinctive shape, resembling an inverted letter "Y", is a direct result of this geological history. The main glacial flow followed the path of the pre-existing river valley down the northern arm and the southwestern (Como) arm. Glacial erosion eventually breached the mountainous barrier between Bellagio and Varenna, diverting the main ice flow (and subsequently the Adda river) into the pre-existing valley forming the southeastern branch. The promontory of Bellagio separates the two southern branches at this confluence point, shaped by differential glacial erosion. As the glaciers retreated during the Last Glacial Maximum and subsequent phases, they deposited large moraine systems, particularly south of the lake, forming the hilly landscape of the Brianza region. The mountainous region between the Como and Lecco branches (between the cities of Como, Bellagio, and Lecco) is known as the Larian Triangle (Triangolo lariano). (Note: The meaning of Larian is related to Lake Como, from the Latin name Larius.) It is the source of the Lambro river. Canzo is the chief town of the local Comunità Montana del Triangolo Lariano.

=== Hydrology ===
The primary inflow for Lake Como is the Adda River, which enters the lake near Colico on the northern branch, having been diverted from its pre-glacial course by glacial action. The Mera River also forms a major inflow at the northern end. The Adda is also the sole major outflow, exiting from the southeastern branch. This hydrological arrangement leaves the southwestern branch as a cul-de-sac with no major outlets, making the city of Como historically more susceptible to flooding than Lecco.

The lake's water balance is dominated by these river flows, with precipitation on the lake surface and evaporation playing secondary roles. With a large volume of approximately 22.5 cubic kilometres (5.4 cu mi), Lake Como has a residence time estimated at 5.5 years. Lake Como is a deep lake exhibiting strong seasonal thermal stratification. It is classified as warm monomictic, meaning its waters typically mix fully from surface to bottom only once per year, during late winter (usually February-March) when surface waters cool sufficiently to sink. This annual mixing is crucial for transporting oxygen to the deep waters. During summer, the lake develops a distinct warm surface layer (epilimnion), separated from the cold, deep hypolimnion (where temperatures remain around 6–7 °C year-round) by a sharp transition zone known as the thermocline (or metalimnion). Water circulation within the lake is influenced significantly by local winds, particularly the regular diurnal breezes: the Breva blowing from the south in the afternoon and the Tivano from the north in the morning, which drive surface currents. Water levels fluctuate seasonally depending on inflows from snowmelt and rainfall, and are regulated by the dam at Olginate on the Adda river outflow.

== Ecology ==
=== Flora ===
The mild, humid climate influenced by the lake supports a rich diversity of plant life characteristic of the Insubria region. Along the immediate shores and lower slopes, Mediterranean species like olive trees (historically cultivated, evidenced by names like Oliveto Lario), laurel, myrtle, and cypress thrive. The villa gardens famously cultivate exotic subtropical plants alongside native species. Vegetation is strongly zoned by altitude: foothills (up to 800 m) are dominated by mixed deciduous forests of oak (including downy oak on drier slopes), chestnut, hornbeam, manna ash, and poplar. Higher elevations transition to beech forests and then extensive conifer forests (including silver fir, spruce, larch, and mountain pine). The highest altitudes feature alpine meadows and shrublands with juniper, Rhododendron, bilberry, and green alder. The area hosts several endemic plant species, particularly on limestone substrates, such as Campanula raineri and Primula glaucescens. True aquatic vegetation is relatively scarce due to the steep, deep nature of the shores, mostly confined to shallower areas like the northern Piano di Spagna nature reserve.

=== Fauna ===
The varied habitats support diverse fauna. Larger mammals in the surrounding mountains and forests include red deer, roe deer, and chamois, along with wild boar and red foxes. Birdlife is abundant, featuring common forest species and birds of prey like the common buzzard and hawks. The lake itself is a vital habitat for waterfowl, especially during migration and wintering. Numerous species of ducks, grebes, swans, gulls, and cormorants are present. Herons, particularly the grey heron, are common residents, favouring quieter stretches of shoreline.

Lake Como hosts over 25 fish species. Due to its great depth and limited shallow littoral zones, pelagic species are dominant. These include the native whitefishes – locally known as lavarello (common whitefish) and bondella (blue whitefish) – and the shad agone. These fish, feeding primarily on zooplankton, form the basis of the lake's traditional commercial fishery and local cuisine (e.g., missoltino). Trout species also inhabit the deeper waters. The more limited littoral zones support populations of European perch, northern pike (less common due to scarcity of vegetated shallows), tench, chub, roach, and common carp. The burbot (Lota lota) is a native bottom-dwelling predator. Several introduced species have established populations, some becoming invasive. These include the pumpkinseed sunfish, large predatory catfish like the wels catfish, and invertebrates such as the zebra mussel and the aggressive red swamp crayfish, which pose ecological challenges.

== Climate ==
According to the Köppen climate classification, Lake Como experiences a humid subtropical climate. The average temperature in the surrounding region fluctuates from 4 °C (39 °F) in January to 25 °C (77 °F) in July. The water temperature reaches an average of 26 °C (79 °F) in July, making it pleasant for water activities during the summer months.

The climate around Lake Como features distinct seasonal variations. During winter, the lake exerts a moderating influence, helping to maintain a mild average temperature of 7 °C (45 °F) in the nearby area. Snowfall is erratic and generally confined to higher elevations, while occasional periods of frost can occur due to the influence of the Siberian Anticyclone.

Spring and autumn are typically mild and agreeable transitional seasons, with average daytime temperatures around 17 °C (63 °F). Precipitation tends to be more frequent during these periods.

Summer days are generally warm, with average daytime temperatures exceeding 27 °C (81 °F). Heatwaves have become more common in recent years, occasionally bringing temperatures as high as 38 °C (100 °F) and leading to hot, humid conditions. This season is also subject to thunderstorms and, at times, violent hailstorms.

=== Impact of climate change ===
Historically, winters in the Lake Como region were characterized by significant snowfall and cold temperatures, with average daily temperatures in January and February often falling below freezing. However, due to global warming, average winter temperatures have progressively increased since the beginning of the 21st century. A record high of 21 °C (70 °F) was recorded on January 27, 2024, reflecting this warming trend. Similarly, summers, once known for their pleasant climate, have experienced rising average temperatures since the 2010s. Severe weather events, such as intense rainstorms and hailstorms, previously infrequent, have become increasingly common, impacting the region's climate patterns.

Climate data for Lake Como
Month	Jan	Feb	Mar	Apr	May	Jun	Jul	Aug	Sep	Oct	Nov	Dec	Year
Record high °C (°F)	21 (70)	22 (72)	24 (75)	26 (79)	31 (88)	37 (99)	38 (100)	37 (99)	31 (88)	25 (77)	29 (84)	21 (70)	38 (100)
Mean daily maximum °C (°F)	6 (43)	8 (46)	13 (55)	17 (63)	23 (73)	27 (81)	30 (86)	29 (84)	23 (73)	19 (66)	12 (54)	9 (48)	18 (64)
Mean daily minimum °C (°F)	−2 (28)	−1 (30)	4 (39)	7 (45)	12 (54)	16 (61)	19 (66)	19 (66)	13 (55)	9 (48)	4 (39)	2 (36)	9 (47)
Record low °C (°F)	−18 (0)	−16 (3)	−11 (12)	−5 (23)	−1 (30)	3 (37)	7 (45)	5 (41)	4 (39)	−3 (27)	−9 (16)	−10 (14)	−18 (0)
Average precipitation mm (inches)	79 (3.1)	74 (2.9)	109 (4.3)	157 (6.2)	201 (7.9)	175 (6.9)	137 (5.4)	173 (6.8)	160 (6.3)	147 (5.8)	127 (5.0)	66 (2.6)	1,605 (63.2)
Average precipitation days	9	8	10	12	13	11	8	9	8	10	11	9	118
Average relative humidity (%) (daily average)	84	76	69	74	72	71	73	72	74	81	85	86	76
Mean monthly sunshine hours	59	97	151	176	209	242	285	253	187	129	65	58	1,911
Average ultraviolet index	1	2	3	5	7	8	8	7	5	3	2	1	4
Source 1:
Source 2:

== History ==
=== Antiquity ===
The area around Lake Como has been inhabited since prehistoric times, although the first significant settlement, Comum, emerged during the Iron Age (first millennium BC), embedded within the broader Golasecca culture. Its strategic position between the northern regions and the Po Valley made it important early on. In 196 BC, the Roman army under Consul Claudius Marcellus conquered the area from the Celtic Comenses. The settlement was fortified after raids by Rhaetian tribes. Under Roman rule, the area became a key strategic outpost. The Romans constructed the Via Regina, a vital road connecting the lake (Larius, as they called it) with the Rhaetian region to the north and serving as an important trade route between the Po Valley and the Rhine Valley under Emperor Augustus. Tradesmen frequently crossed the Alps via this route into present-day Switzerland. In 77 BC, 3,000 Roman settlers repopulated the area. A pivotal moment came in 59 BC when, under Julius Caesar, the town was drained of marshland and re-established on its current lakeside location as Novum Comum. Caesar populated it with an additional 5,000 colonists. During this period, Como hosted notable figures like Pliny the Elder and Pliny the Younger. The latter depicted the lake in his Epistulae as a haven for study, hunting, and fishing. The influential Magistri Comacini, a guild of skilled builders, stonecutters, and decorators, originated during this era and developed a reputation for fine craftsmanship throughout Europe. By the 4th century AD, the Notitia Dignitatum confirms the presence of a Roman military fleet commanded by a Praefectus stationed on the lake, underscoring its continued military importance.

=== Medieval and Foreign Rule ===
After the fall of the Western Roman Empire, Como flourished but its wealth attracted invasions from Goths and Huns, who imposed heavy taxes. In 774 AD, the city was freed by the Lombards and continued to develop. During the Lombard rule, the Via Regina was reopened and restored by Queen Theodolinda. Around 1000 AD, Como became an independent commune but soon had to contend with the expansionist ambitions of Milan. Throughout the Middle Ages and Renaissance, the lake remained strategically vital, allowing access to the Maloja and Stelvio Pass and becoming a stage for military conflicts. In the 12th century, during the war of Milan against Como, Como's fleet fought naval battles against Milanese forces. Como's famous defensive towers, still visible today, were constructed under Holy Roman Emperor Frederick Barbarossa between 1158 and 1162, marking a temporary end to Milanese dominance. Power later passed to Milanese families, notably the Visconti and the Sforza. Many of Como's historic churches, including San Carpoforo, Sant'Abbondio, San Fedele, San Giacomo, and San Provino, date from this period. The Milanese lords considered widening the Adda riverbed and initiated the Paderno Canal project to link the lake with Milan. Later, between 1525 and 1532, the lake was the scene of the Musso war, initiated by Gian Giacomo Medici. Como subsequently experienced periods of decline under Spanish and French rule, marked by harsh taxes. Conditions improved under Austrian rule, particularly during the reign of Charles VI, when taxes were reduced, allowing Como to flourish again. The city's famous Duomo, designed by Filippo Juvarra, (Note: Some sources mention Fontana, but Juvarra is more commonly credited with the dome design.) was largely constructed during this period, and the renowned physicist Alessandro Volta, inventor of the electric battery, was born in Como in 1745. Napoleon ruled the area briefly from 1796 to 1815, before Austrian control was restored following the Congress of Vienna. In 1825, Alessandro Manzoni published his famous novel The Betrothed, set partly in Lecco during the oppressive Spanish rule of 1628 and depicting the devastating plague of 1630. During this plague, the isolated peninsula of Bellagio reportedly avoided infection and supplied bread to nearby Varenna, leaving it on a large lakeside boulder (sasso del pane) in exchange for money disinfected in vinegar. Throughout these often difficult times, local inhabitants relied on fishing, polenta, cheese-making, and smuggling across the nearby Swiss border for survival.

=== Modern Era ===
In 1859, following Giuseppe Garibaldi's victory over the Austrians at the Battle of San Fermo, Lake Como became part of the newly forming Kingdom of Italy under the House of Savoy. The late 18th and 19th centuries brought peace and prosperity, fueled by the burgeoning silk industry, which gained world renown. This era saw the construction of many opulent lakeside villas and summer retreats by wealthy Milanese families seeking respite from the city's heat. Notable examples include Villa Olmo, Villa Serbelloni, Villa Carlotta, Villa del Balbianello, Villa Melzi, and Villa Monastero. The stunning scenery also attracted artists and writers, including Byron, Wordsworth, Shelley, Tennyson, Longfellow, Liszt, and Verdi, who found inspiration by the lake. In the 20th century, Como maintained its reputation for silk and became a center for fabric design and furniture manufacturing, with Villa Erba hosting major exhibitions. Tourism briefly declined after World War II, partly due to the association with Mussolini's capture and death nearby. Near the end of the war, in late April 1945, as Allied forces advanced, Benito Mussolini and his mistress Clara Petacci attempted to flee to Switzerland. Their convoy was intercepted by Italian anti-fascist partisans near Dongo on the northwestern shore on April 27th. After being held overnight, Mussolini and Petacci were taken to the village of Giulino di Mezzegra. On April 28th, 1945, both were executed by the partisans against a wall at the entrance to Villa Belmonte. Their bodies were subsequently transported away from the lake region to Milan for public display. Today, Lake Como is again one of Italy's top tourist destinations, frequented by celebrities and visitors from around the world, yet striving to retain its historical charm and character.

== Cultural significance ==
Lake Como's dramatic scenery, rich history, and association with culture and leisure have made it a significant landmark, inspiring artists and attracting visitors for centuries. Its cultural importance is evident in its historic villas, religious sites, local traditions, and its representation in the arts.

=== Villas and gardens ===
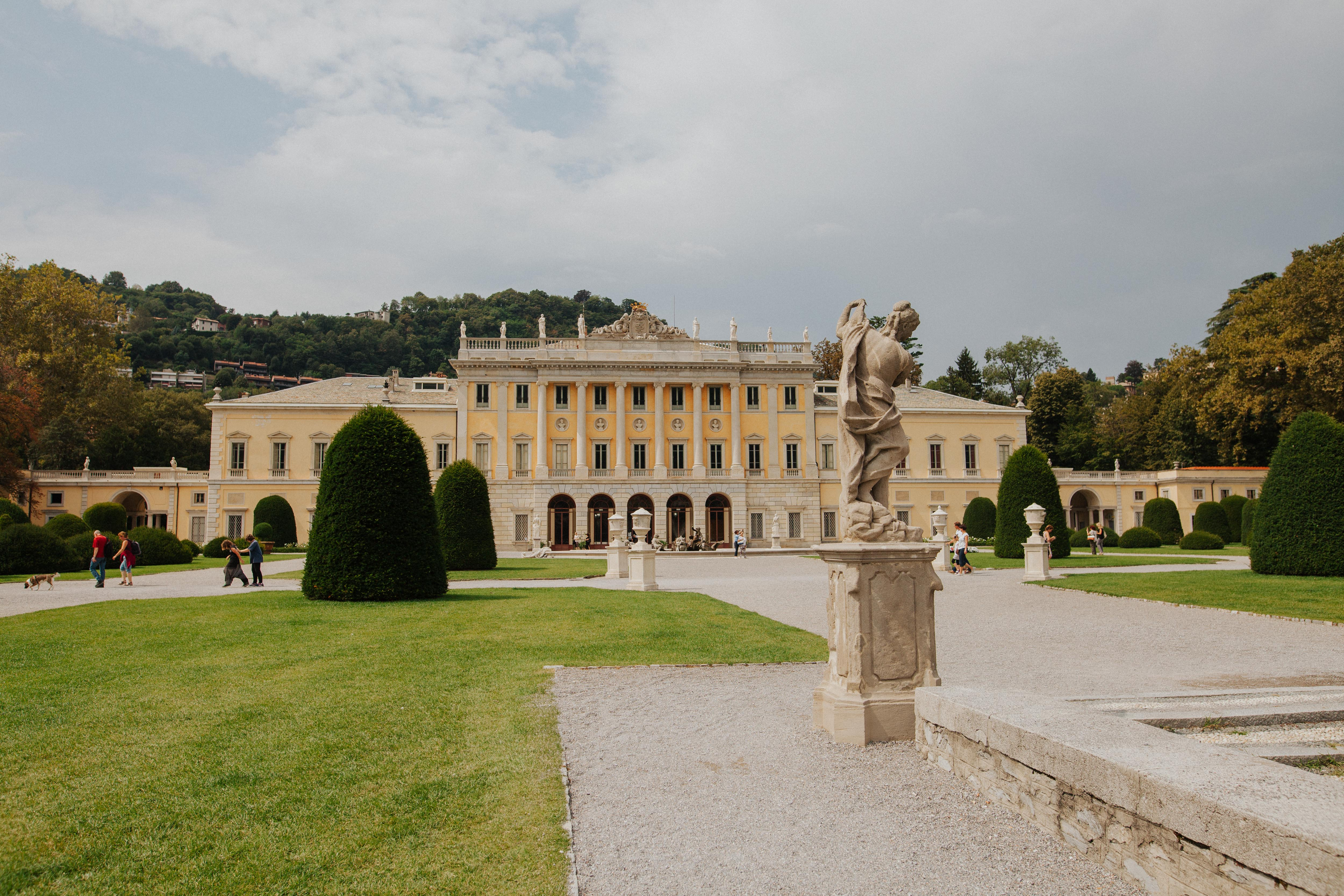
Villa Olmo in Como, a neoclassical masterpiece

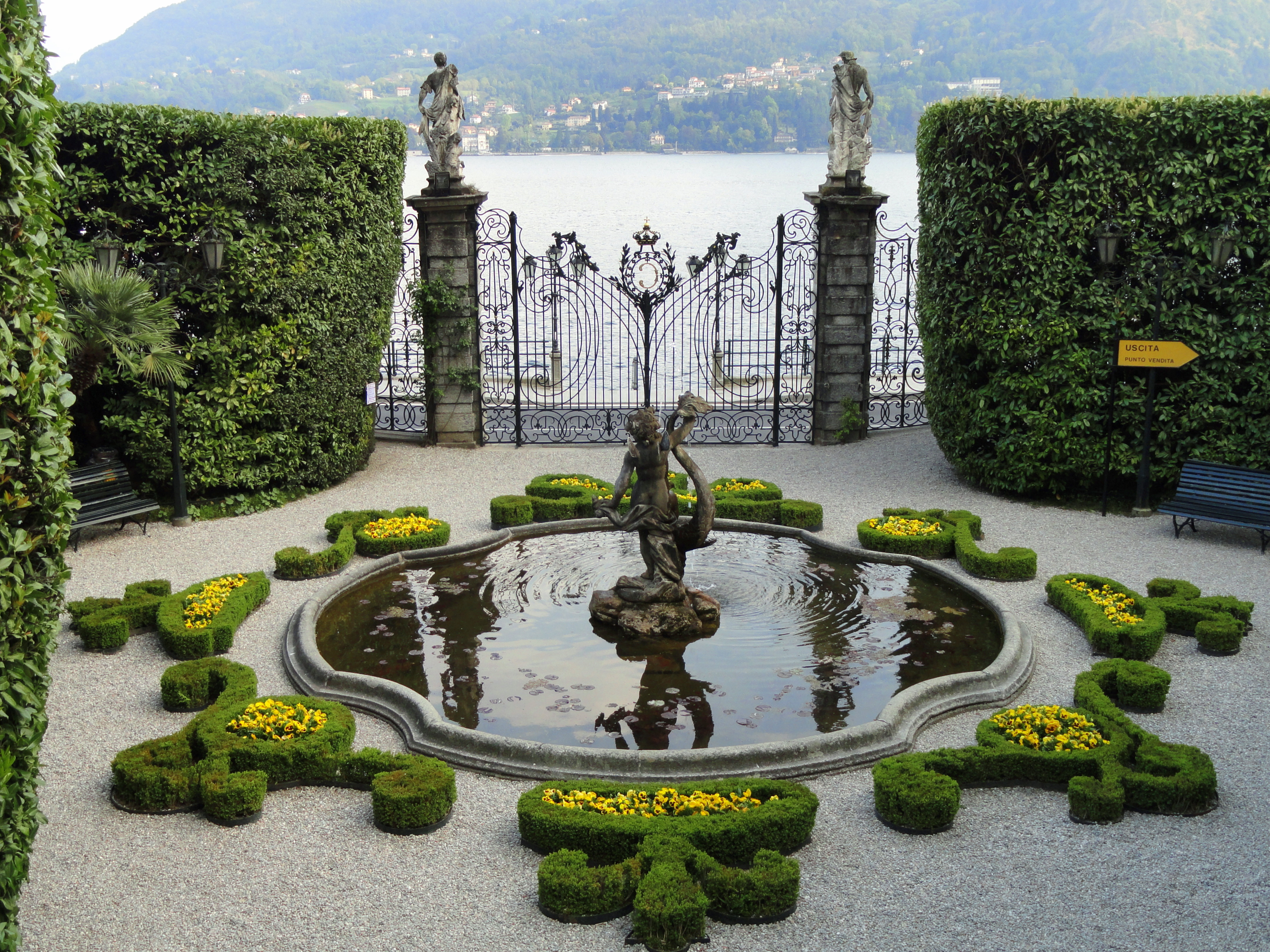
Villa Carlotta, renowned for its botanical garden

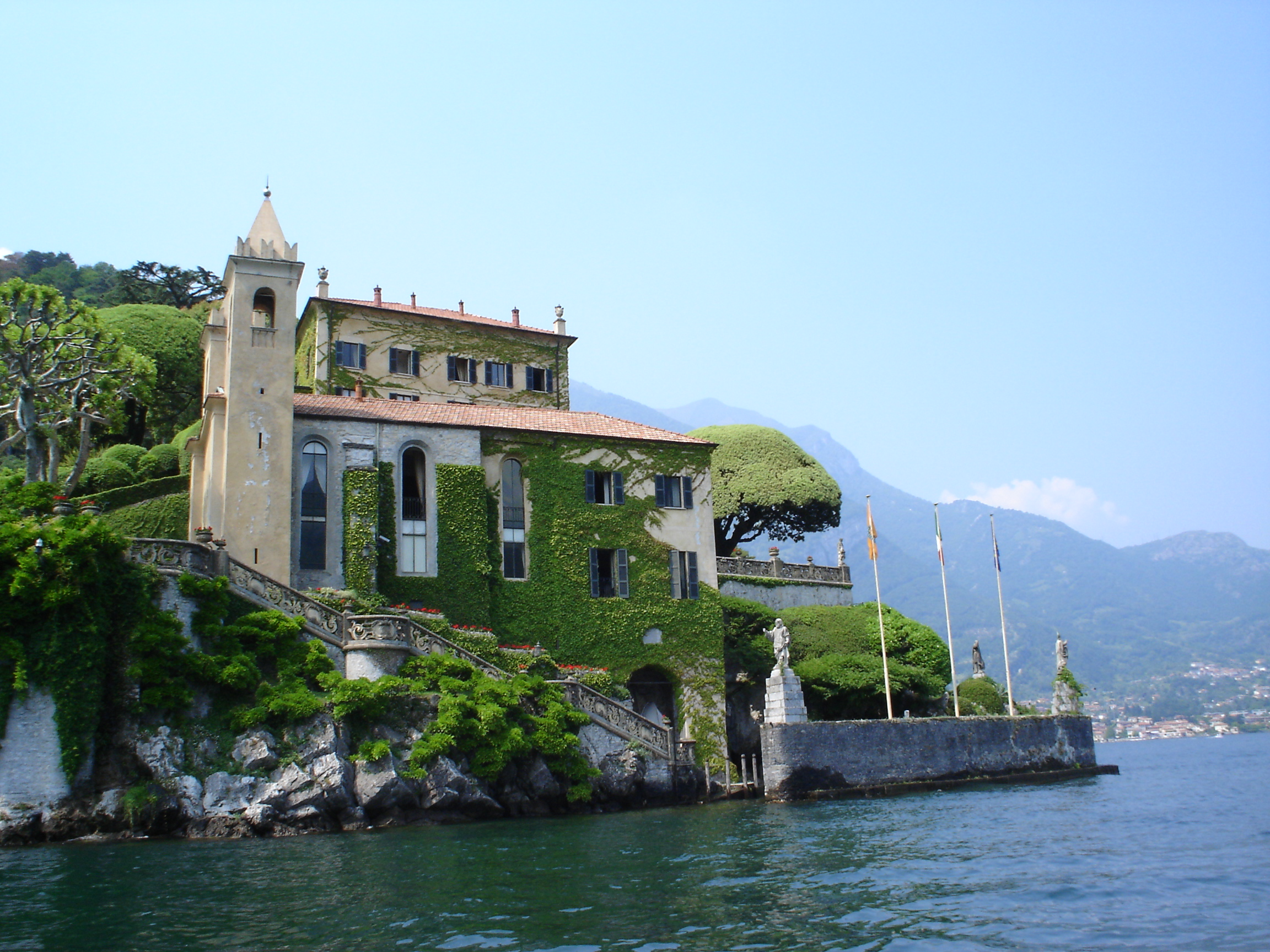
Villa del Balbianello, famous for its terraced gardens and film appearances

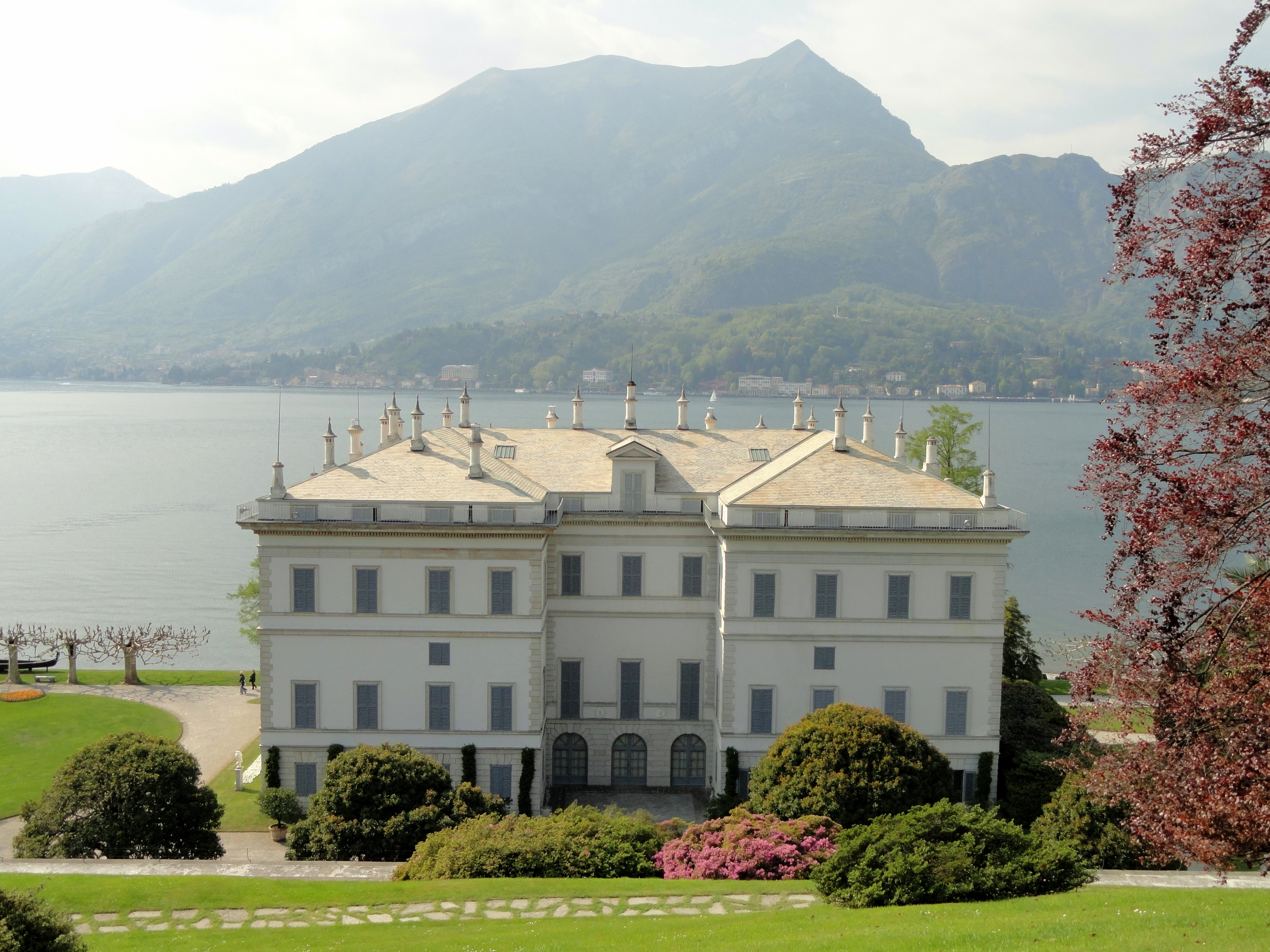
Villa Melzi d'Eril in Bellagio, featuring an extensive park

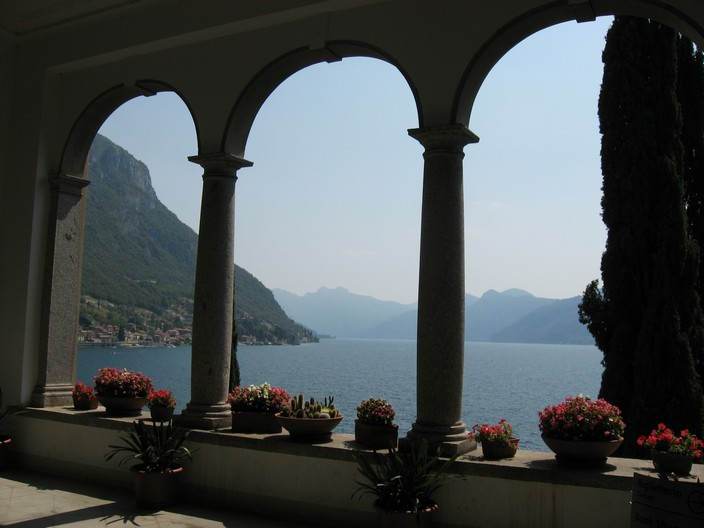
Lake Como vista from Villa Monastero, highlighting the lake's scenic beauty

Lake Como is globally famous for its exquisite villas and their gardens, a tradition rooted in Roman times when Pliny the Younger established his Comedia and Tragedia estates as places of leisure (otium) away from the city. This concept faded during the Middle Ages but was revived during the Renaissance, with villas surrounded by productive gardens featuring orchards, olive groves, and citrus trees. From the 17th century, gardens increasingly followed formal Italian and French designs (parterres, terraces, fountains). The 19th century saw a major shift towards the English landscape garden style, favouring naturalistic designs where plants and landscape predominated. The lake's mild microclimate allows diverse subtropical and Mediterranean plants to flourish.

Notable examples include:

- Villa Carlotta: Built 1690, famous for its collection of azaleas and rhododendrons, combining an Italian formal garden with a later Romantic park. Houses sculptures by Antonio Canova and Luigi Acquisti.
- Villa d'Este: Built 1568 for a cardinal, later home to Caroline of Brunswick. Now a luxury hotel renowned for its Renaissance gardens and high-profile guests.
- Villa del Balbianello: Famous for its elaborate terraced gardens on a wooded peninsula. Built 1787 on a monastery site, later owned by explorer Guido Monzino. Now a popular museum and frequent filming location.
- Villa Melzi d'Eril: Built 1808–1810 in Neoclassical style for the Vice-President of the Napoleonic Italian Republic. Features an extensive landscape park, orangery, chapel, and Japanese garden.
- Villa Serbelloni: Different from the nearby Grand Hotel Villa Serbelloni, this estate houses the Rockefeller Foundation Bellagio Center. Its park offers panoramic views and covers grounds possibly including Pliny the Younger's Tragedia villa.
- Villa Monastero: Originally a Cistercian monastery, transformed into an eclectic villa with a notable botanical garden stretching along the lakefront.

=== Sacro Monte di Ossuccio ===
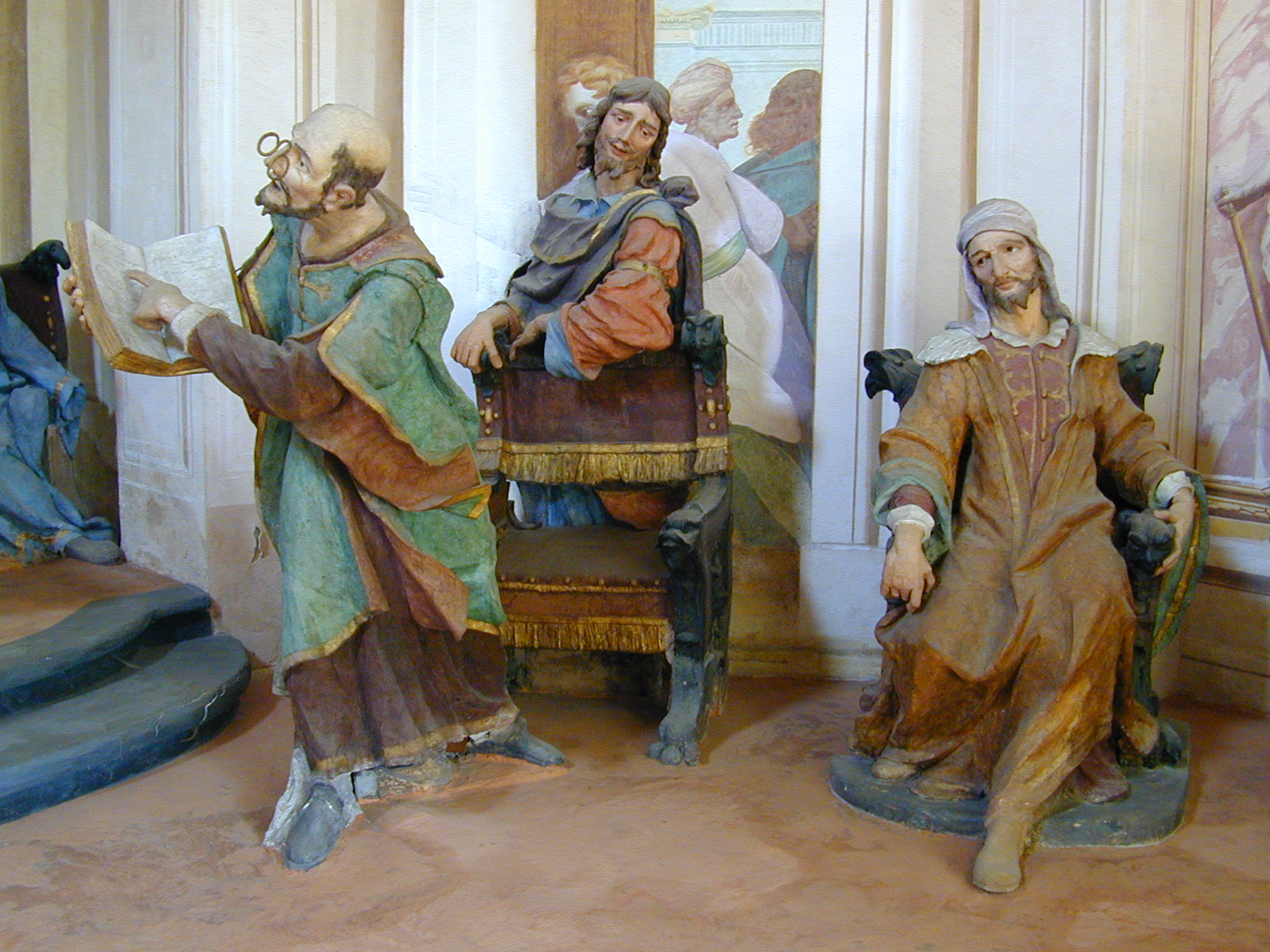
Chapel 5 of Sacro Monte di Ossuccio, depicting the Disputation with the Doctors

The Sacro Monte di Ossuccio (Sacred Mount of Ossuccio) is a Roman Catholic sanctuary located on a hillside slope above Ossuccio, facing Isola Comacina. It is one of the nine Sacri Monti of Piedmont and Lombardy, designated a UNESCO World Heritage Site in 2003. Built between 1635 and 1710, the complex consists of fifteen Baroque-style chapels spaced along a path leading up to a main sanctuary. The chapels, adorned with statues and frescoes, depict the Mysteries of the Rosary and offer pilgrims a devotional journey culminating at the sanctuary dedicated to the Coronation of the Virgin.

=== Lake Como in arts and culture ===
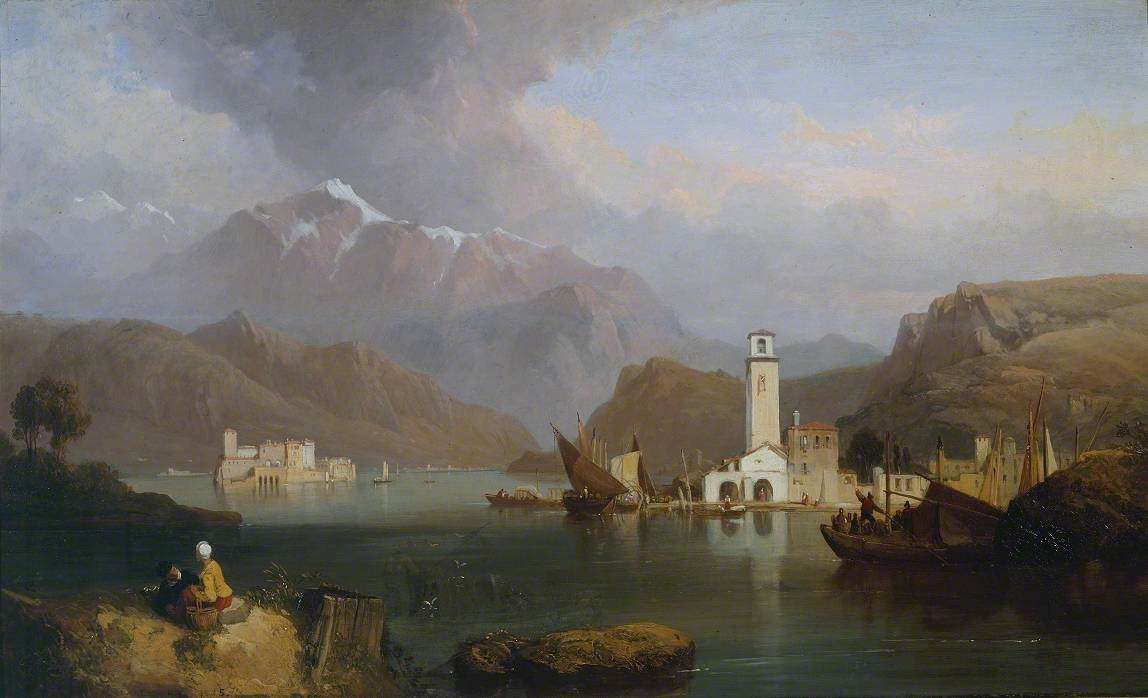
Lake Como by Clarkson Stanfield, 1825

The lake's beauty has long inspired artists, writers, and musicians.

- Literature: Pliny the Younger described his lakeside villas in the 1st century AD. Later writers captivated by the lake include Alessandro Manzoni (in The Betrothed), Stendhal (whose La Chartreuse de Parme begins with a description inspired by Villa Carlotta), Percy Bysshe Shelley, Mary Shelley, Lord Byron, Henry Wadsworth Longfellow, and Mark Twain. In his 1869 travelogue The Innocents Abroad, Twain described Como as lying "between mountains of stone" whose bases were "adorned with charming villas and gardens" rising from the water. While admiring the "graceful terraces," "marble statues," and "colourful flowers", he ultimately compared Lake Como unfavourably to the American Lake Tahoe, declaring Tahoe offered a grander, more beautiful panorama devoid of the smaller scale, "toy villages" he perceived at Como. Letitia Elizabeth Landon's 1837 poem The Lake of Como interprets a painting by Samuel Prout.
- Film: The scenic backdrop has featured in numerous films, including The Pleasure Garden (1925), Bobby Deerfield (1977), A Month by the Lake (1995), Star Wars: Episode II – Attack of the Clones (2002), Ocean's Twelve (2004), Casino Royale (2006),, Murder Mystery (2019) and War 2 (2025).
- Music: Composers Franz Liszt and Giuseppe Verdi visited and were inspired by the lake. Liszt stayed in Bellagio in late 1837 with Marie d'Agoult, and their daughter Cosima (later Wagner's wife) was born there. While travelling during this period, Liszt composed pieces for his Années de pèlerinage. Although the piano piece Au lac de Wallenstadt evokes the mood and "sighing waves" of the nearby Swiss Lake Walen, it originated from this creatively fertile Italian journey that included his significant stay on Lake Como. More recently, Gwen Stefani filmed her Cool video at Villa Erba by the lake, and Marina Diamandis mentioned the lake in the song Cuntissimo and filmed parts of its music video at Villa del Balbianello.

=== Cuisine ===
The cuisine of the Lake Como area, known as cucina lariana, features a blend of ingredients from the lake and the surrounding mountains. Freshwater fish are central, with perch (persico), whitefish (lavarello), twaite shad (agone), char (salmerino), and pike-perch (lucioperca) being commonly used. Popular dishes include risotto with perch fillets (risotto al persico), and missoltini – sun-dried, salted, and pressed shad, typically grilled and served with polenta, a staple accompaniment, often served uncia (with local melted cheese and butter) or alongside braised meats and stews like casoeûla (a traditional Lombard pork and cabbage dish). The region produces a variety of cheeses, both cow's and goat's milk, from lakeside farms and mountain pastures (alpeggi), including types like Zincarlin, Semuda, and Lariano. Local salami and meats like bresaola are also features. The mild climate supports olive cultivation, with locally produced oils like Lario DOP recognized. Traditional desserts include Miascia (a simple bread-based cake with fruit), Pan Mataloch (a local variant of panettone), and Nocciolini di Canzo (small hazelnut biscuits). Local wines, both white (from grapes like Verdese and Pinot Bianco) and red (from Merlot and Sangiovese), are produced, particularly on the hillsides of the upper lake area.

=== Traditions and events ===
The area surrounding Lake Como maintains strong local traditions, expressed through numerous popular festivals, religious celebrations, and community events throughout the year. Notable annual events include:

- The ancient carnival Carnevale di Schignano, known for its traditional wooden masks.
- The Sagra di San Giovanni in late June, celebrating the patron saint of Como with events often centered around Isola Comacina, including traditional boat processions and a large fireworks display over the lake.
- Summer Lake Festivals (Feste del Lago) in towns like Gravedona, featuring fireworks reflected on the water.
- Various sagre (food festivals) dedicated to local products, such as the Sagra dei Missoltini in Dongo (August) and autumn chestnut festivals (Festa della Castagna) in mountain villages like Peglio.
- Cultural events like the Festival Musica sull'Acqua in Colico and surrounding areas, featuring classical and contemporary music performances in scenic locations.
- Winter traditions, including lakeside nativity scenes (presepi sull'acqua) and New Year's Eve torchlight processions (fiaccolata) on the water, particularly in Colico.
- Agricultural fairs, such as the Mostra Zootecnica in Gravedona and the Fiera di San Carlo in Domaso, celebrate the area's rural heritage.
- Historical reenactments related to medieval Como, such as Palio del Baradello, take place annually in the city.

== Economy ==
The economy of the Lake Como area (provinces of Como and Lecco) is multifaceted, blending industry, tourism, and services, deeply influenced by the lake itself. Historically, waterways facilitated transport, silk production (via mulberry cultivation), and power for industries. In recent decades, tourism has become increasingly prominent, sometimes seen as offsetting declines in traditional industrial sectors. Modern economic pillars include manufacturing specialized in distinct districts, a significant tourism sector, a strong craft base, and a vibrant cultural economy, supported by skilled labor and strategic connections to Milan, Switzerland, and Europe. At the end of 2023, the area had nearly 72,000 registered businesses and over 315,000 employees.

=== Tourism ===
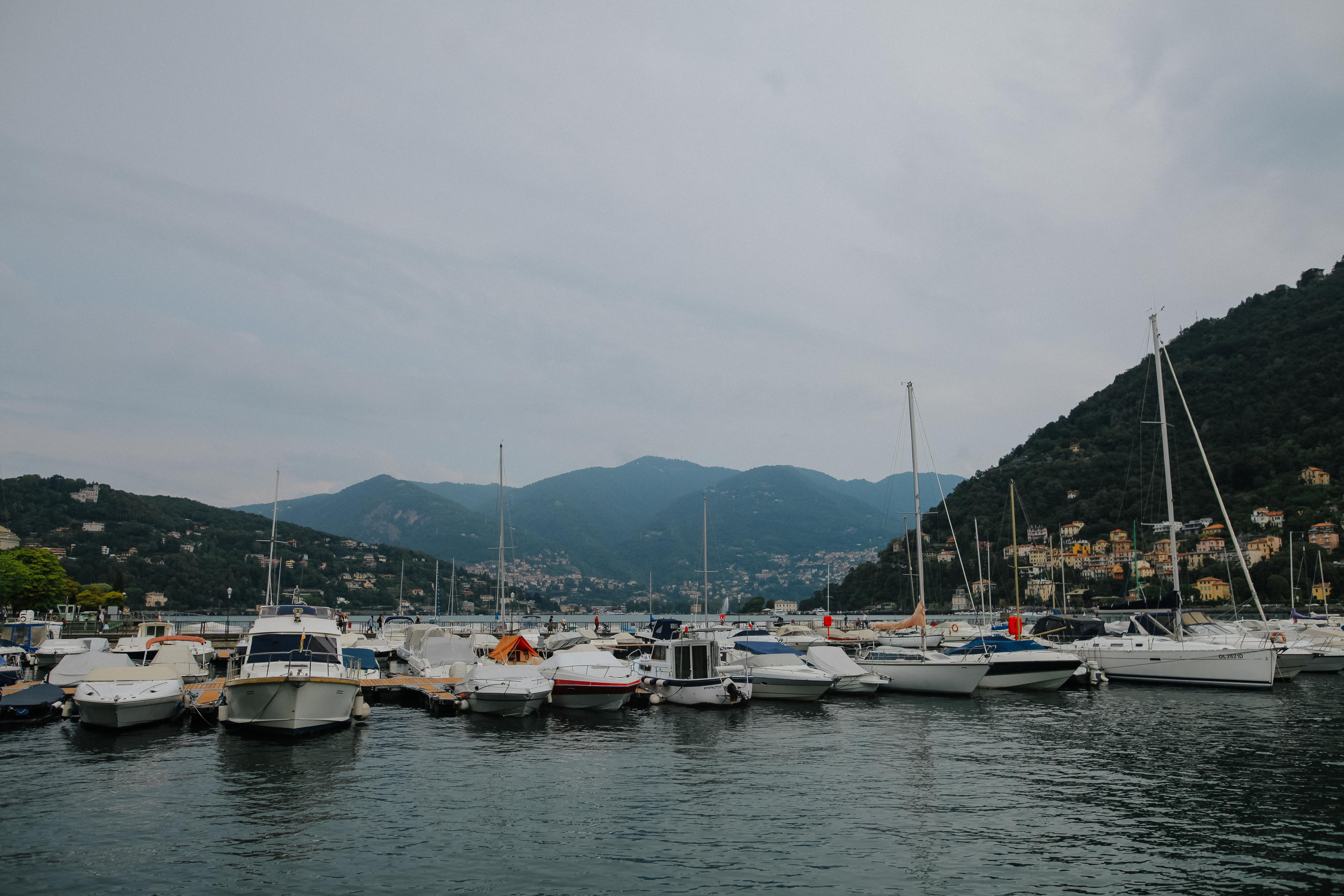
A picturesque dock in Viale Geno, Como

Lake Como's allure as a premier international tourist destination stems from its dramatic scenery, historic villas, charming villages, and mild climate. The sector is a fundamental component of the local economy, particularly for the lakeside towns. Tourism generates significant revenue (estimated at €1.5 billion in 2023) and supports numerous businesses, including hotels, restaurants, shops, transport services, and cultural guides.

The tourism structure includes both traditional hotels and a significant non-hotel sector (B&Bs, campsites, holiday rentals). Historically, the main visitor markets have been Germany, the United States, the United Kingdom, and France, alongside domestic Italian tourism. Tourism is highly seasonal, concentrated primarily in the summer months. Following a significant downturn caused by the COVID-19 pandemic, tourism rebounded strongly in the early 2020s, with visitor numbers and overnight stays exceeding pre-pandemic levels by 2023, largely driven by the return of international tourists. Current trends indicate a strong luxury market segment, an emphasis on experiential travel focusing on villas and unique activities, and a growing focus on sustainability within the local hospitality industry. This high demand, however, contributes to significant challenges related to overtourism.

==== Outdoor activities and safety ====
The lake provides a scenic backdrop for various outdoor activities; hiking and cycling are popular pursuits in the surrounding mountains, offering panoramic views of the lake and picturesque villages. Activities such as sailing, windsurfing, and kitesurfing, attract enthusiasts of water sports. While Lake Como is generally considered safe, caution is advised for those seeking to swim in its waters. Local regulations prohibit diving and swimming in the city of Como and in many nearby lakeside villages, except in designated areas such as private lidos or authorized public beaches. These restrictions are in place primarily owing to the inherent dangers of the lake, where the water can shift abruptly from shallow to deep near the shoreline; due to unpredictable acquatic conditions and a sharp thermocline, diving poses a risk of sudden thermal shock. Additionally, bathing can be hazardous because of the presence of toxic algae, harmful bacteria, and the frequent passage of boats close to the shore, all of which increase the risk of accidents and health issues.

==== Overtourism ====
Lake Como has become a prominent example of the challenges posed by overtourism. Its transformation into a globally recognized destination, amplified by celebrity appeal, film locations, and social media visibility, has led to a dramatic increase in visitor numbers. In 2023, the area recorded 4.8 million overnight stays, straining local infrastructure with overcrowded public transport, congested roads, and essential services struggling to cope, particularly during peak season. This intense pressure occurs in a territory noted for its hydrogeological fragility, where land consumption for tourism development raises concerns about environmental sustainability and has been linked to increased risks of floods and landslides, such as those affecting Blevio and Laglio in recent years. The socio-economic impacts are significant, contributing to what some locals describe as the "great escape from the lake". The boom in tourism, particularly the shift towards short-term rentals driven by platforms like Airbnb, has inflated property prices, making housing increasingly unaffordable for the local population. This gentrification contributes to the depopulation of historic villages, with some, like Nesso, Pognana Lario, and Veleso, losing up to 30% of their residents over two decades. The situation creates tension between the demands of the tourism economy and the quality of life for inhabitants, leading to reports of residents feeling trapped in their homes during busy weekends and essential services like schools facing closure due to dwindling local enrollment. Efforts to manage the influx include visitor caps at popular sites like Villa del Balbianello and the introduction of entry fees in smaller villages.

=== Transport ===
Transport by boat on the lake is provided by Gestione Governativa Navigazione Laghi (Navigazione Laghi). The eastern shore of the lake is followed by the Tirano–Lecco railway, with regional train services operated by Trenord. International EuroCity trains call at Como San Giovanni station on the Milan–Chiasso railway.

=== Manufacturing ===
Manufacturing remains crucial, with around 9,500 companies in 2023, concentrated in specific industrial districts:

- Textiles (Silk): Centered in Como province, the historic Como Silk District excels in high-quality silk weaving, finishing, and apparel/accessory production. It's a key reason Como is a UNESCO Creative City for Crafts. Como province hosts around 1,050 textile firms employing over 12,500 people, making it a leading center in Italy for this sector. Textile exports neared €1.8 billion in 2023.
- Mechatronics (Metalworking & Engineering): Primarily based in Lecco province, this sector boasts over 4,000 companies and nearly 51,000 employees. Lecco ranks first regionally and nationally for the relative concentration of metalworking businesses (9% of its total). The Lecco Metalworking District focuses on metal production, processing, machinery, and automation, exporting over €6.6 billion in 2023.
- Furniture and Design: The Brianza Furniture industrial district, partly located in Como province near Cantù, involves nearly 1,000 companies and employs about 7,800 people. Known for high-quality wood and metal furniture, design, and finishing, its exports reached €840 million in 2023.

=== Craftsmanship ===
Artisan businesses are vital, numbering approximately 22,900 (35% of all businesses, significantly above average) and employing over 54,200 people (21% of the workforce) in 2023. Lecco province has a particularly high density of craft enterprises. Construction (39% of craft businesses) and metalworking (10%) are dominant craft sectors.

=== Trade ===
The area is strongly export-oriented. In 2023, exports exceeded €12 billion against imports of over €7 billion, yielding a trade surplus of €5.1 billion. Key export sectors include machinery/electronics ("other industry"), metal products, and textiles. Main import sectors are similar. Europe is the primary trading partner (73% exports, 76% imports), followed by Asia. Top individual export destinations are Germany, France, and the US; top import sources are Germany, China, and France.

=== Infrastructure ===
The economy benefits from proximity to three major airports: Malpensa, Linate, and Orio al Serio. Key roads include the A9 motorway, between Milan and the border with Switzerland, the busy SS36 between Milan and Valtellina, close to the eastern branch of the lake, and the scenic but congested SS340 - Regina and SS583 - Lariana along the western and eastern shores of the Como branch respectively. Rail links, lake transport, and infrastructure for cycle paths and hiking trails are also vital.

== Notable towns and villages ==
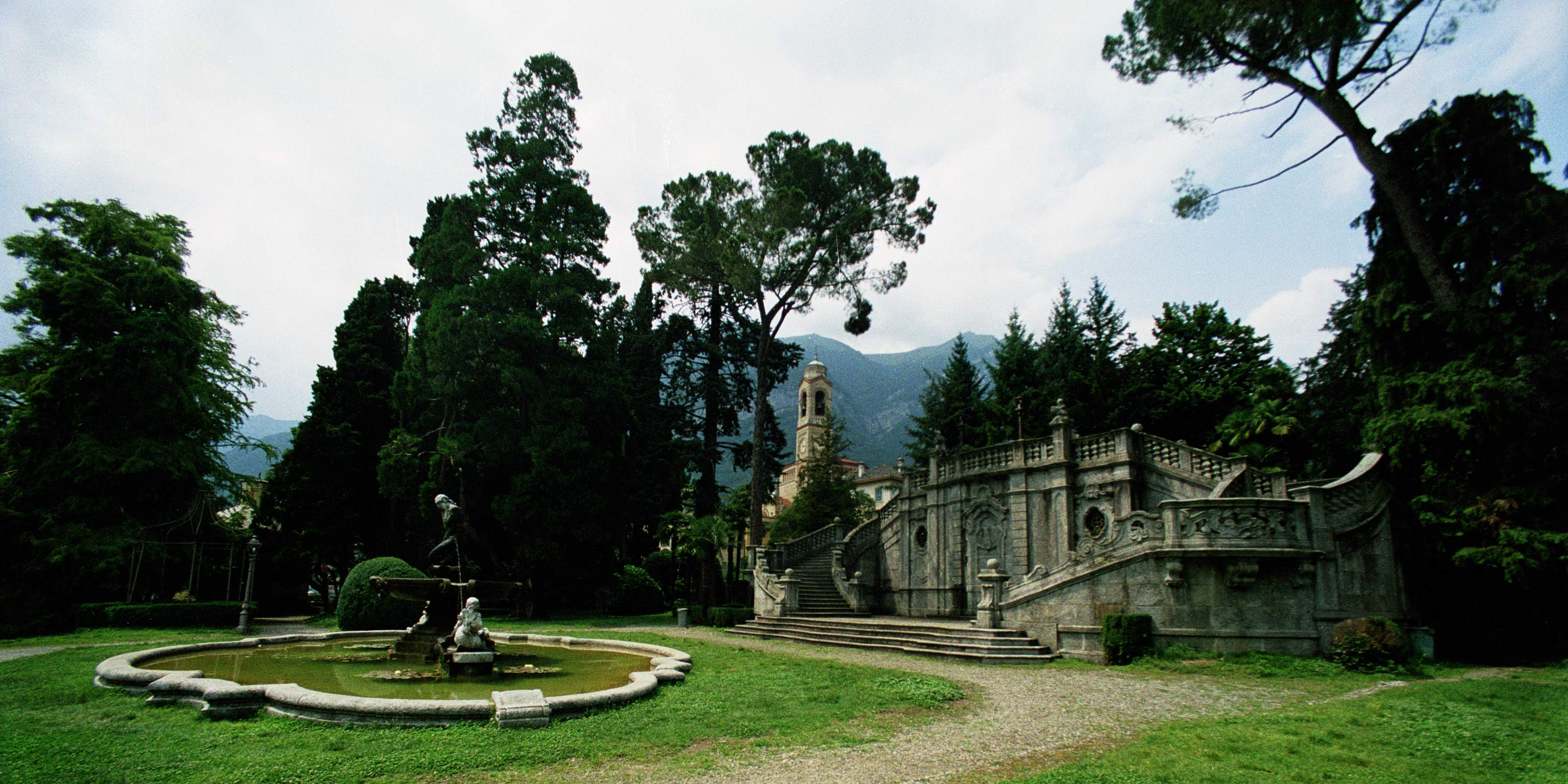
The Parco Meier, a public garden in Tremezzo, offering lakeside views

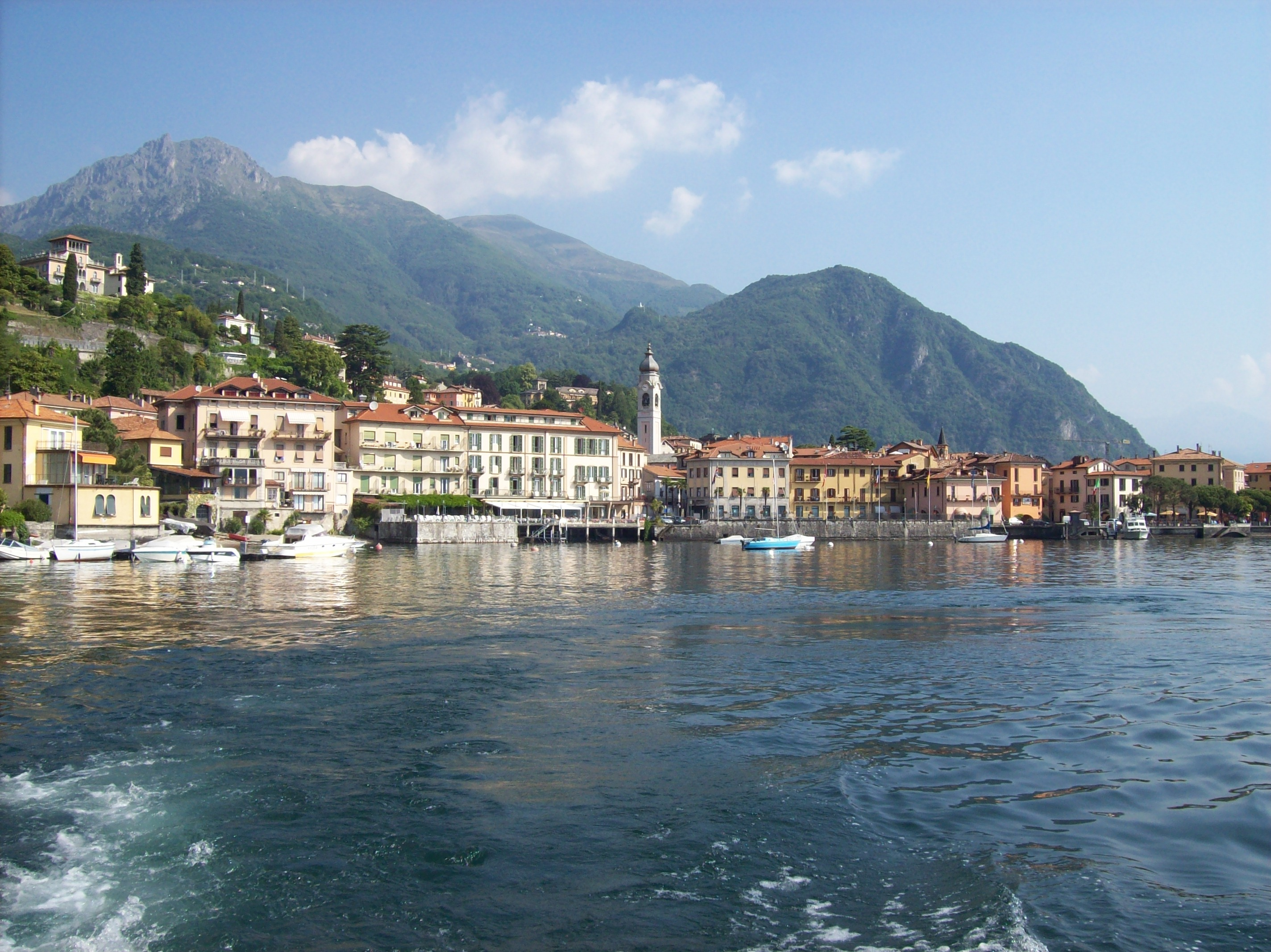
Menaggio from Lake Como, showcasing the town's charming waterfront

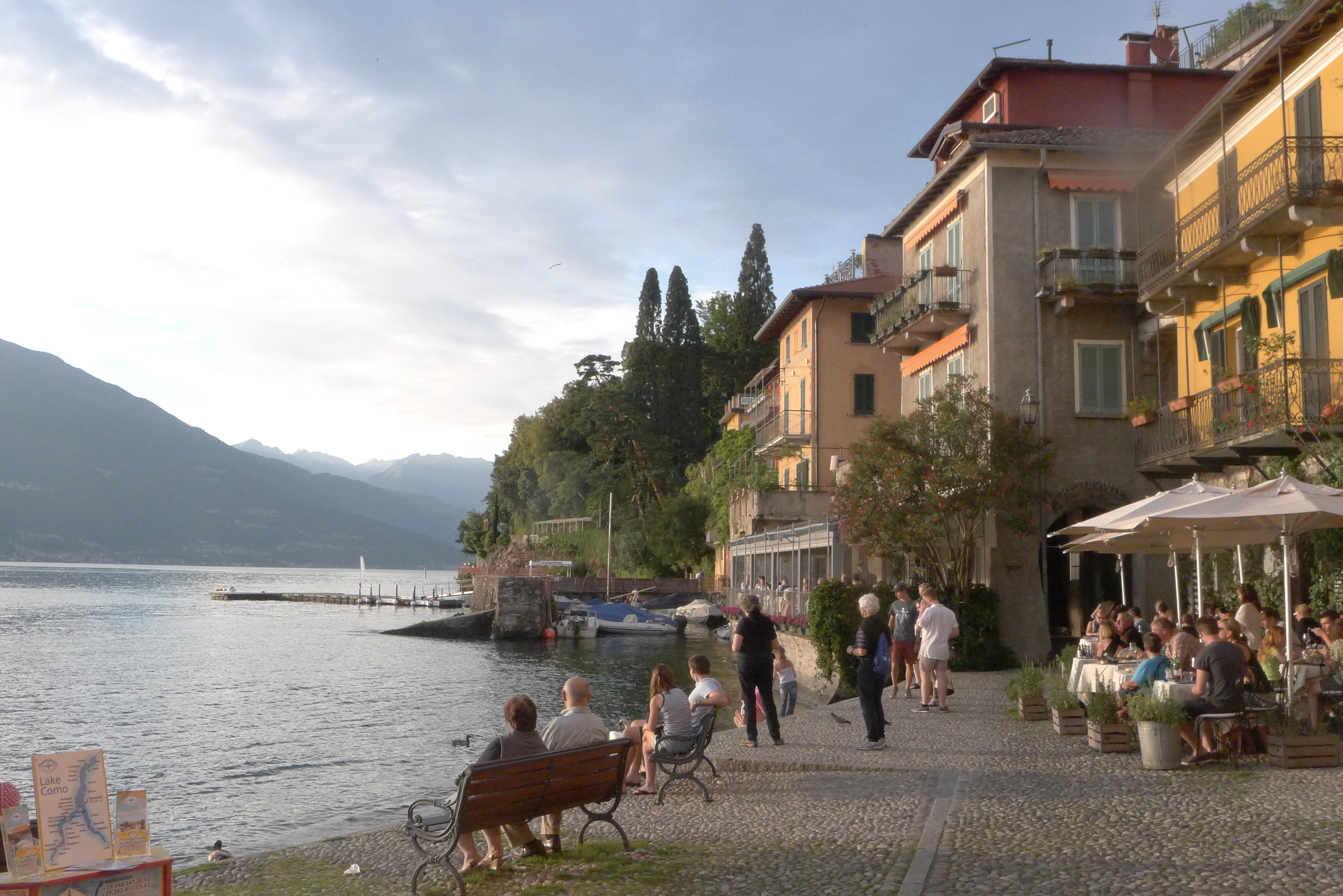
The Lake Como waterfront at sunset, Varenna, showcasing the town's charm

Numerous towns and villages line the shores of Lake Como. The table below lists the principal settlements on each shore:

Western shore from North to South	South shore from West to East	Eastern shore from North to South
Domaso; Gravedona; Dongo; Musso; Menaggio; Cadenabbia; Griante; Tremezzo; Mezzegra; Lenno; Ossuccio; Sala Comacina; Colonno; Argegno; Brienno; Moltrasio; Cernobbio; Como	Como; Blevio; Brunate (above Como); Torno; Nesso; Bellagio; Oliveto Lario; Malgrate; Lecco	Colico; Dorio; Dervio; Bellano; Varenna; Lierna; Mandello del Lario; Abbadia Lariana; Lecco

== See also ==
- Italian Lakes
- List of lakes of Italy
