= Sacro Monte di Ossuccio =

Sanctuary in Ossuccio, Lombardy, Italy

Sacred Mountain of Ossuccio Sacro Monte di Ossuccio Santuario Madonna del Soccorso
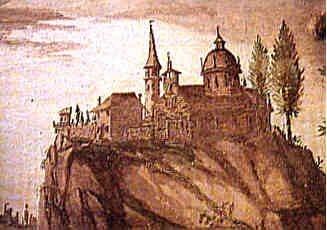
- The Sanctuary atop its crag, as depicted in a fresco in Capella XIV.

Religion
- Affiliation: Roman Catholic
- Province: Como
- Ecclesiastical or organisational status: National monument
- Status: Active

Location
- Location: Ossuccio, Italy
- Interactive map of Sacred Mountain of Ossuccio; Sacro Monte di Ossuccio; Santuario Madonna del Soccorso
- Coordinates: 45.974644°N 9.177289°E

Architecture
- Type: Church

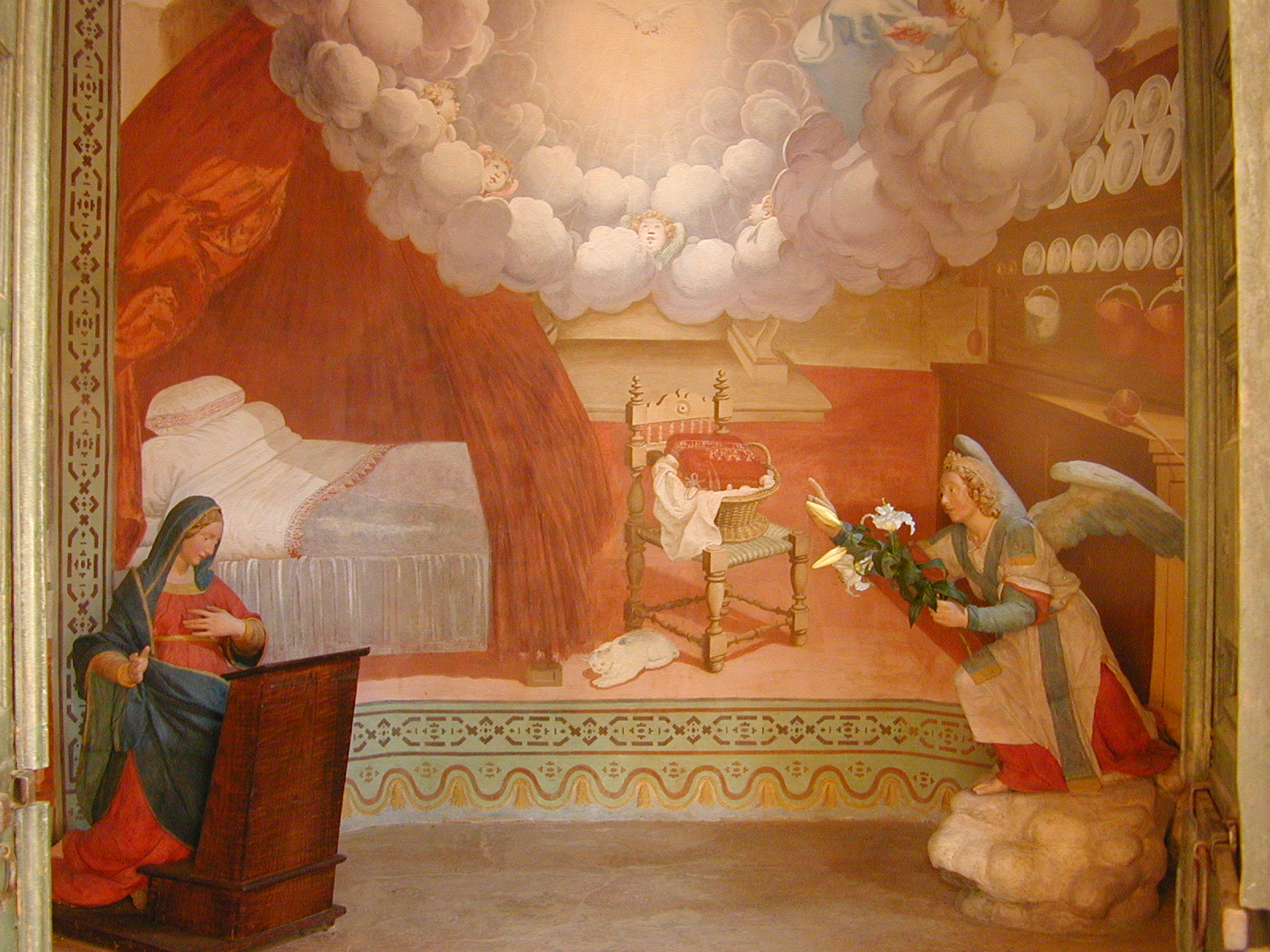
Chapel I with The Annunciation.

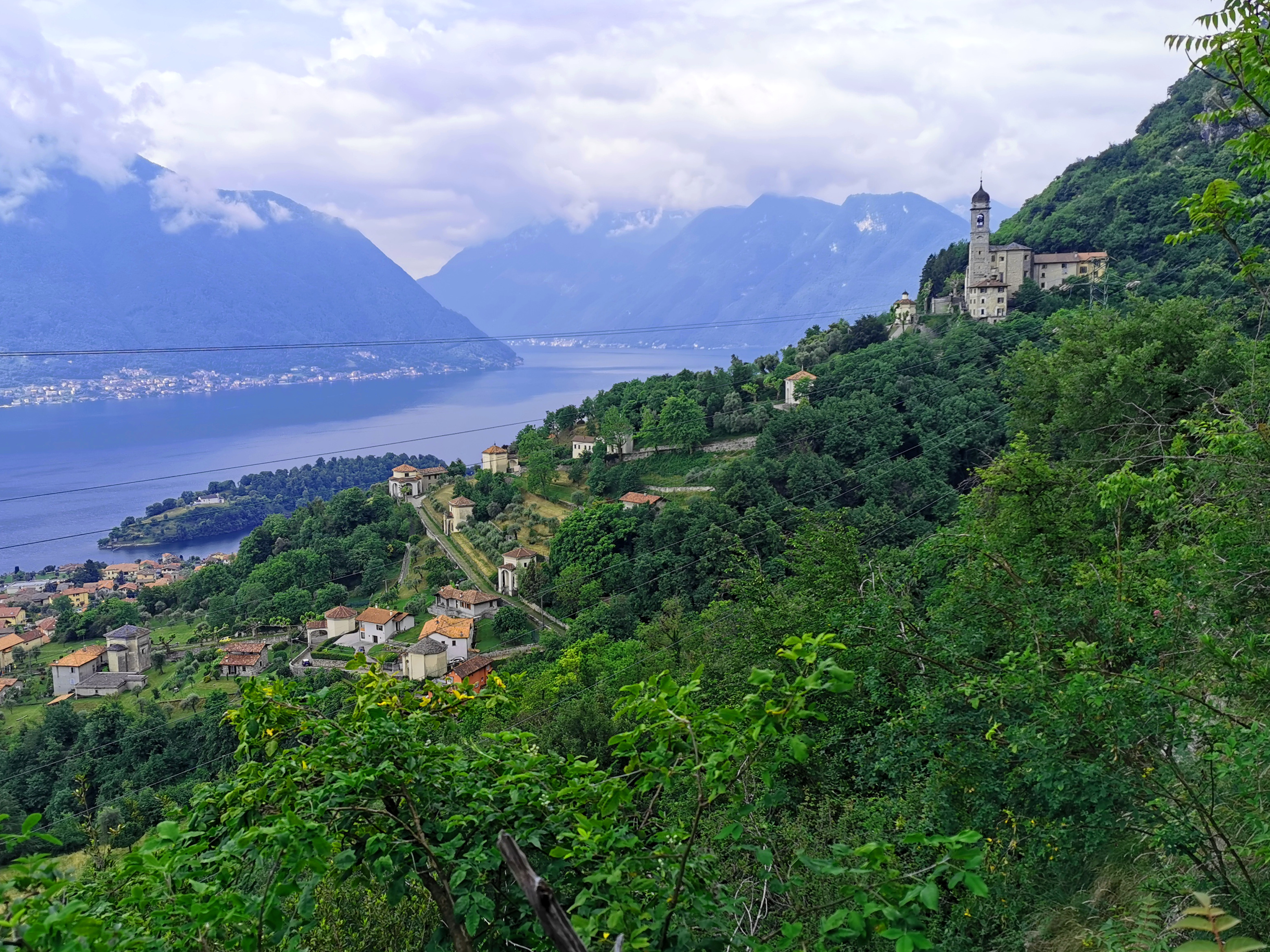
Sanctuary of the Beata Vergine del Soccorso with Via Crucis and Lake Como

The Sacro Monte di Ossuccio (literally "Sacred Mount of Ossuccio") is one of the nine sacri monti in the Italian regions of Lombardy and Piedmont, in northern Italy, which were inscribed on the UNESCO list of World Heritage Sites in 2003.

The devotional complex is located in Ossuccio, on a prealpine crag some 200 metres above the western shore Lake Como, facing Isola Comacina and some 25 km from the city of Como. Surrounded by olive groves and woodland, it is quite isolated from other buildings. The fourteen chapels, constructed between 1635 and 1710 in the typical Baroque style reflecting the Counter-Reformation ethos of the sacri monti movement, are joined by a path which leads up to a pre-existing sanctuary of 1532 placed on the summit and dedicated to La Beata Vergine del Soccorso.

The Chapels
I	The Annunciation	VIII	The Crowning with Thorns
II	The Visitation	IX	The Ascent of Calvary
III	The Nativity	X	The Crucifixion
IV	The Presentation at the Temple	XI	The Resurrection
V	The Disputation between Jesus and the Doctors in the Temple	XII	The Ascension
VI	The Oration at Gethsemane	XIII	Pentecost
VII	The Flagellation	XIV	The Assumption of the Virgin
