= Ponna =

Ponna Pona (Lombard)
- Comune
- Comune di Ponna
- Coat of arms

- Location within Italy Location within Lombardy
- Coordinates: 45°59′N 9°6′E
- Country: Italy
- Region: Lombardy
- Province: Province of Como (CO)

Area
  - Total: 6.0 km^{2} (2.3 sq mi)

Population (Dec. 2004)
  - Total: 264
  - Density: 44/km^{2} (110/sq mi)
- Time zone: UTC+1 (CET)
  - Summer (DST): UTC+2 (CEST)
- Postal code: 22020
- Dialing code: 031

Ponna (Comasco: Pona [ˈpoːna]) is a comune (municipality) in the Province of Como in the Italian region Lombardy, located about 60 kilometres (37 mi) north of Milan and about 20 kilometres (12 mi) north of Como. As of 31 December 2004, it had a population of 264 and an area of 6.0 square kilometres (2.3 mi^{2}).

Ponna borders the following municipalities: Claino con Osteno, Colonno, Laino, Ossuccio, Porlezza, Sala Comacina.

== Demographic evolution ==
Historical population

Year	Pop.	±%
1861	451	—
1871	447	−0.9%
1881	556	+24.4%
1901	544	−2.2%
1911	613	+12.7%

Year	Pop.	±%
1921	659	+7.5%
1931	523	−20.6%
1936	461	−11.9%
1951	489	+6.1%
1961	465	−4.9%

Year	Pop.	±%
1971	331	−28.8%
1981	327	−1.2%
1991	289	−11.6%
2001	262	−9.3%

Source: Data from ISTAT
