= Ossuccio =

- Comune
- Comune di Ossuccio
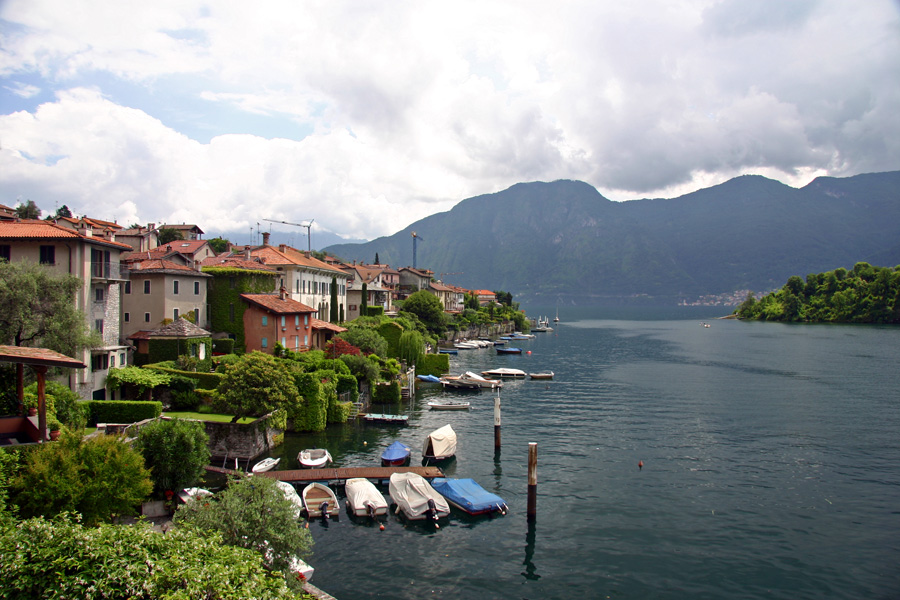
- Ossuccio

- Location within Italy Location within Lombardy
- Coordinates: 45°58′N 9°11′E
- Country: Italy
- Region: Lombardy
- Province: Como (CO)

Government
  - Mayor: Giorgio Cantoni

Area
  - Total: 8.0 km^{2} (3.1 sq mi)

Population (Dec. 2004)
  - Total: 975
  - Density: 120/km^{2} (320/sq mi)
- Time zone: UTC+1 (CET)
  - Summer (DST): UTC+2 (CEST)
- Postal code: 22010
- Dialing code: 0344

Ossuccio (Lombard: Ossusc) is a comune (municipality) in the Province of Como in the Italian region Lombardy. It is located on the western shore of Lake Como some 20 kilometres (12 mi) northeast of Como. As of 31 December 2004, it had a population of 975 and an area of 8.0 square kilometres (3.1 mi^{2}).

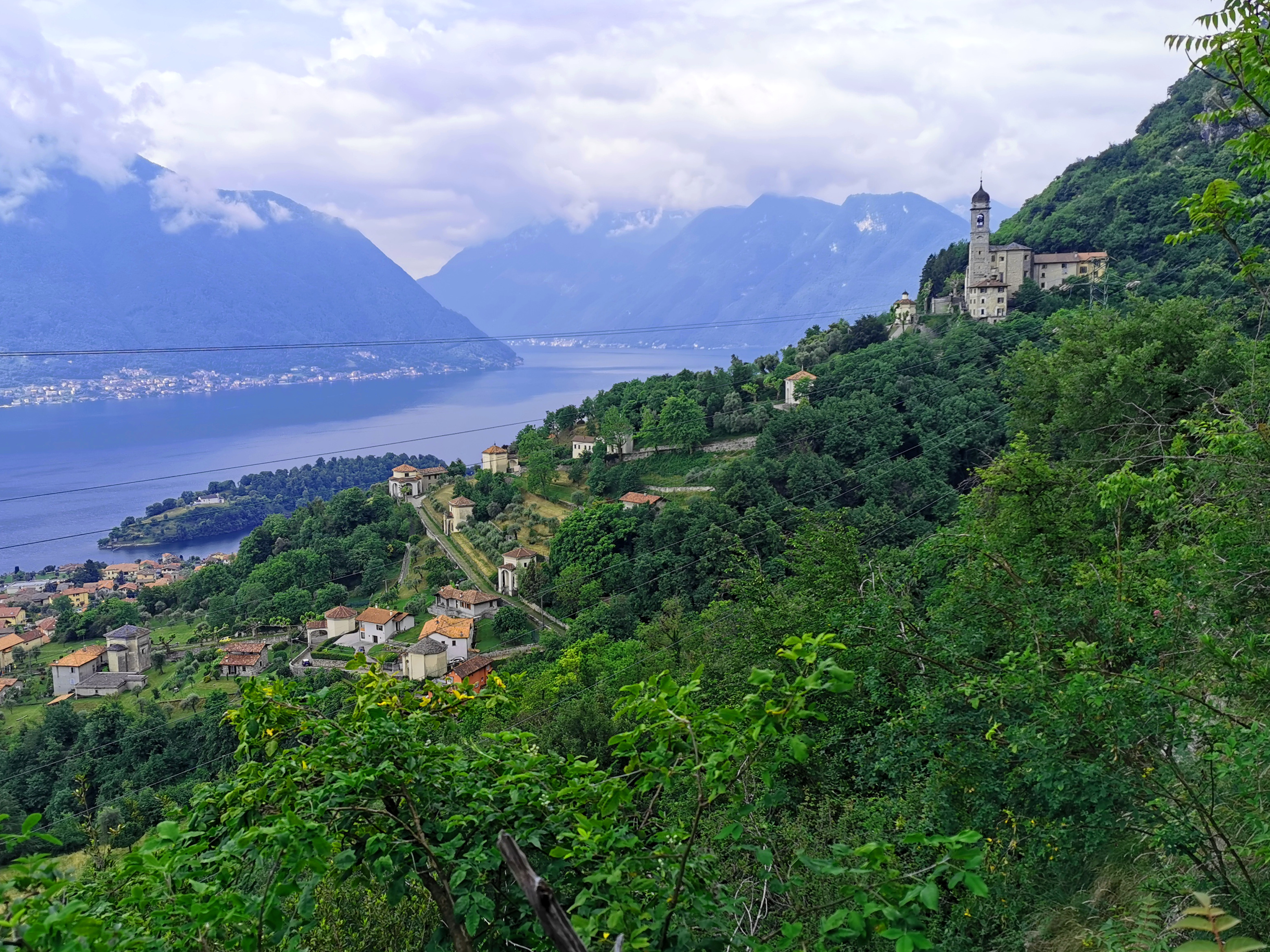
Sanctuary of the Beata Vergine del Soccorso with Via Crucis and Lake Como

It is known for the Sacro Monte, a site of pilgrimage and worship close to it, for the late 16th century Villa del Balbiano , the mid-20th century Villa Leoni , and for the island of Comacina which falls within its territory.

Ossuccio borders the following municipalities: Colonno, Lenno, Lezzeno, Ponna, Porlezza, Sala Comacina.

The Comune di Ossuccio will be united to Mezzegra, Lenno and Tremezzo to form a single municipality named Tremezzina: the new administration will be formalized after election of the Major on 25 May 2014.

== Demographic evolution ==
Historical population

Year	Pop.	±%
1861	917	—
1871	899	−2.0%
1881	1,009	+12.2%
1901	1,080	+7.0%
1911	1,204	+11.5%

Year	Pop.	±%
1921	1,134	−5.8%
1931	1,015	−10.5%
1936	959	−5.5%
1951	1,012	+5.5%
1961	929	−8.2%

Year	Pop.	±%
1971	908	−2.3%
1981	925	+1.9%
1991	917	−0.9%
2001	940	+2.5%

Source: Data from ISTAT
