= Isola Comacina =

Island in Lake Como, Italy

Coordinates: 45°58′N 9°10′E

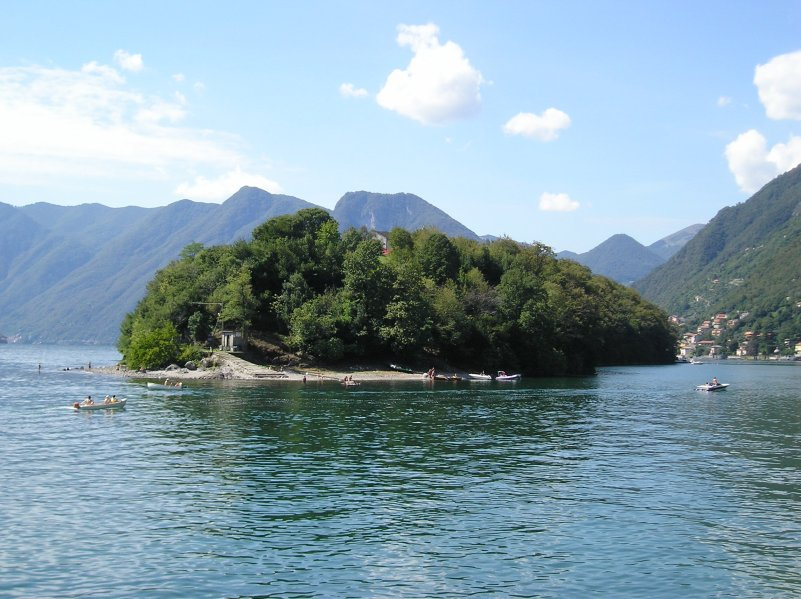
Isola Comacina

Isola Comacina is a small wooded island of Italy’s Lake Como, administratively a part of the commune of Ossuccio. It is located close to the western shore of the Como arm of the lake in front of a gulf known as Zoca de l'oli, a Lombard name referring to the local small-scale production of olive oil. In the late 6th century (c. 587) the island was a remaining Roman stronghold under Francio, a subordinate of Narses; though the areas surrounding Lake Como were entirely controlled by the Lombards. The island was besieged for a good deal of time by the Lombards under Authari who released Francio to flee back to Narses' capital at Ravenna. The Lombards found the island to contain "many riches" deposited for safekeeping by local Roman loyalists.

The island was invaded in 1169 by Frederick Barbarossa and soldiers from the town of Como. In 1175, Vidulfo, the Bishop of Como, cursed the island with the following words, "The bells will never ring, the rocks will never be placed one over the other, nobody will do here the work of the publican, the punishment a violent death."

In 1919 the island was given to Belgium, in homage to King Albert I. The island was returned the following year.

Pietro Lingeri built three houses on the island in 1939. His idea was to turn the island into a colony for artists. The houses were built in a rationalist style, made from local materials and without much decoration.

The island pre COVID-19 consisted of a restaurant, cafe, a collection of archaeological sites and three artist houses. Now the businesses have closed and the houses unavailable.
