= Colonno =

Colonno Colònn (Lombard)
- Comune
- Comune di Colonno
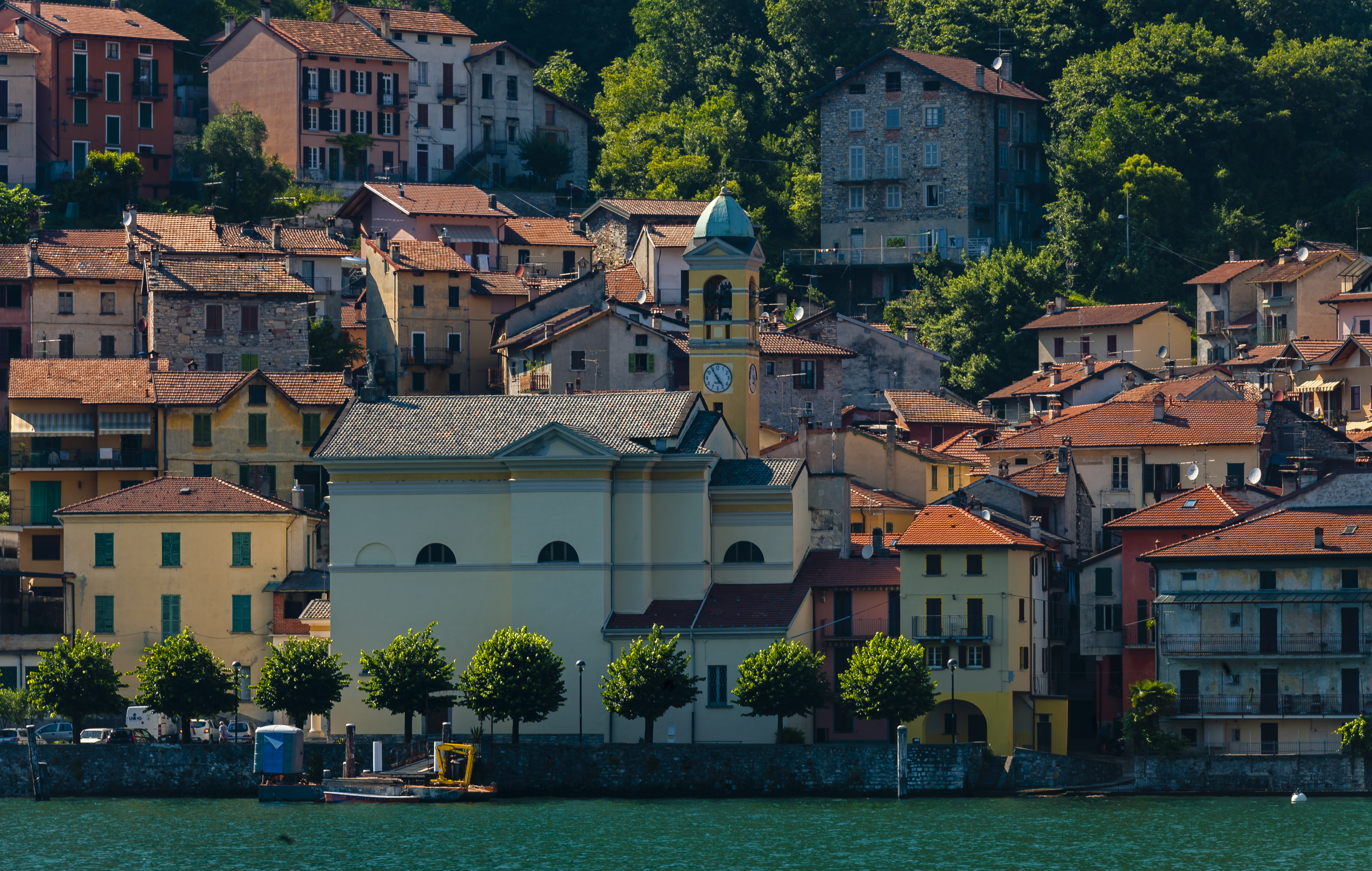
- Central Colonno from the lake

- Location within Italy Location within Lombardy
- Coordinates: 45°57′N 9°9′E
- Country: Italy
- Region: Lombardy
- Province: Province of Como (CO)

Area
  - Total: 5.7 km^{2} (2.2 sq mi)

Population (Dec. 2004)
  - Total: 557
  - Density: 98/km^{2} (250/sq mi)
- Time zone: UTC+1 (CET)
  - Summer (DST): UTC+2 (CEST)
- Postal code: 22010
- Dialing code: 031

Colonno (Lombard: Colònn [kuˈlɔn]) is a comune (municipality) in the Province of Como in the Italian region Lombardy, located about 50 kilometres (31 mi) north of Milan and about 15 kilometres (9 mi) northeast of Como. As of 31 December 2004, it had a population of 557 and an area of 5.7 km^{2} (2.2 sq mi).

Colonno borders the following municipalities: Argegno, Laino, Lezzeno, Ossuccio, Pigra, Ponna, Sala Comacina.

== Demographic evolution ==
Historical population

Year	Pop.	±%
1861	536	—
1871	626	+16.8%
1881	734	+17.3%
1901	738	+0.5%
1911	746	+1.1%

Year	Pop.	±%
1921	831	+11.4%
1931	842	+1.3%
1936	835	−0.8%
1951	899	+7.7%
1961	863	−4.0%

Year	Pop.	±%
1971	816	−5.4%
1981	666	−18.4%
1991	583	−12.5%
2001	561	−3.8%

Source: Data from ISTAT
