= Sala Comacina =

- Comune
- Comune di Sala Comacina
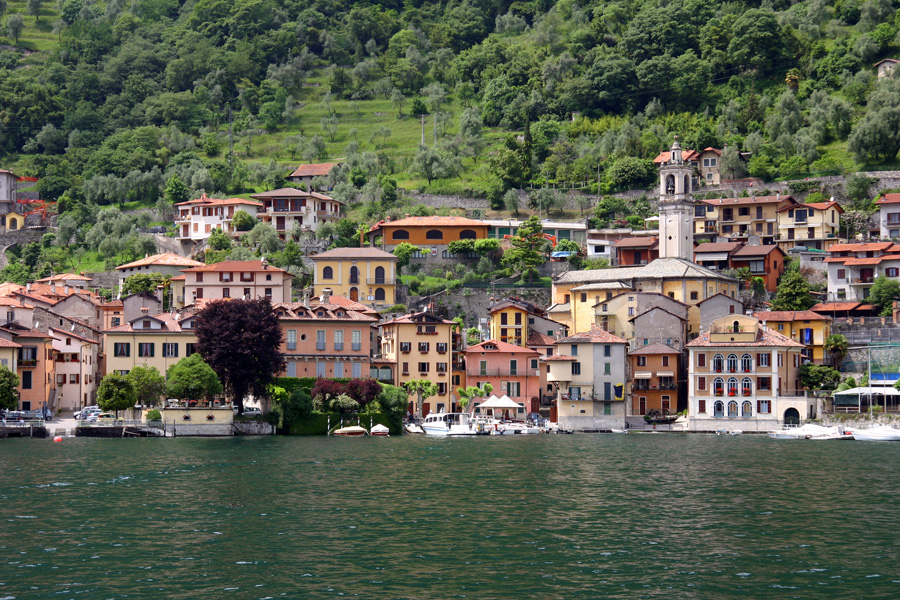
- Sala Comacina

- Location within Italy Location within Lombardy
- Coordinates: 45°58′N 9°10′E
- Country: Italy
- Region: Lombardy
- Province: Province of Como (CO)

Area
  - Total: 5.3 km^{2} (2.0 sq mi)
- Elevation: 213 m (699 ft)

Population (Dec. 2004)
  - Total: 618
  - Density: 120/km^{2} (300/sq mi)
- Demonym: Salesi
- Time zone: UTC+1 (CET)
  - Summer (DST): UTC+2 (CEST)
- Postal code: 22010
- Dialing code: 0344
- Website: Official website

Sala Comacina is a comune (municipality) in the Province of Como in the Italian region Lombardy, located about 60 kilometres (37 mi) north of Milan and about 20 kilometres (12 mi) northeast of Como. As of 31 December 2004, it had a population of 618 and an area of 5.3 square kilometres (2.0 mi^{2}).

Sala Comacina borders the following municipalities: Colonno, Lezzeno, Ossuccio, Ponna.

== Demographic evolution ==
Historical population

Year	Pop.	±%
1861	500	—
1871	522	+4.4%
1881	552	+5.7%
1901	660	+19.6%
1911	744	+12.7%

Year	Pop.	±%
1921	821	+10.3%
1931	753	−8.3%
1936	644	−14.5%
1951	689	+7.0%
1961	661	−4.1%

Year	Pop.	±%
1971	619	−6.4%
1981	609	−1.6%
1991	636	+4.4%
2001	604	−5.0%

Source: Data from ISTAT
