= Death of Benito Mussolini =

1945 death of deposed Italian dictator

Coordinates: 45°58′52″N 9°12′12″E

Mussolini and his likely executioner

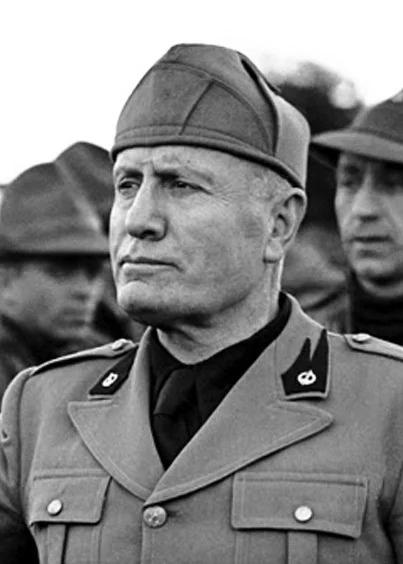
Benito Mussolini, Duce of Fascism

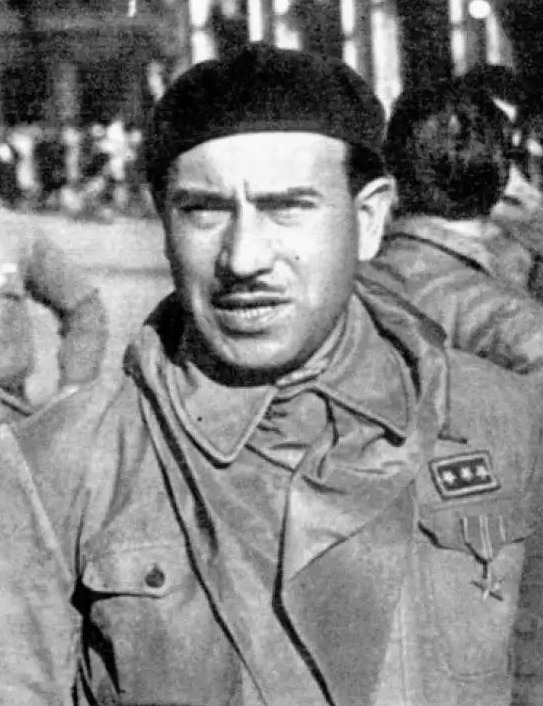
Walter Audisio, the Italian partisan generally believed to have executed Mussolini

Benito Mussolini, the deposed Italian Fascist dictator, was summarily executed by an Italian partisan in the village of Giulino di Mezzegra in northern Italy on 28 April 1945, in the final days of World War II in Europe. The generally accepted version of events is that Mussolini was shot by Walter Audisio, a communist partisan. However, since the end of the war, the circumstances of Mussolini's death, and the identity of his executioner, have been subjects of continuing dispute and controversy in Italy.

In 1940, Mussolini took the country into World War II on the side of Nazi Germany, but was soon met with military failure. By the autumn of 1943, he was reduced to being the leader of a German puppet state in northern Italy, and was faced with the Allied advance from the south, and an increasingly violent internal conflict with the partisans. In April 1945, with the Allies breaking through the last German defences in northern Italy and a general uprising of the partisans taking hold in the cities, Mussolini's situation became untenable. On 25 April he fled Milan, where he had been based, and headed towards the Swiss border. He and his mistress, Clara Petacci, were captured on 27 April by local partisans near the village of Dongo on Lake Como. Mussolini and Petacci were executed the following afternoon, two days before Adolf Hitler's suicide.

The bodies of Mussolini and Petacci were taken to Milan and left in a suburban square, the Piazzale Loreto, for a large angry crowd to insult and physically abuse. They were then hung upside down from a metal girder above a service station on the square. Initially, Mussolini was buried in an unmarked grave, but, in 1946, his body was dug up and stolen by Fascist supporters. Four months later, it was recovered by the authorities, who then kept it hidden for the next 11 years. Eventually, in 1957, his remains were allowed to be interred in the Mussolini family crypt in his home town of Predappio. His tomb has become a place of pilgrimage for neo-fascists and the anniversary of his death is marked by neo-fascist rallies.

In the post-war years, the "official" (Note: In fact, there has never been a determination by any governmental or judicial authority of a particular version of events. This generally accepted version is often termed the "official version", nevertheless. However, to reflect this lack of governmental or judicial authority, sources on the subject have used the term with quotation marks. See Moseley 2004, p. 275) version of Mussolini's death has been questioned in Italy (although not internationally, in general) in a manner that has drawn comparison with the John F. Kennedy assassination conspiracy theories. Some journalists, politicians and historians, doubting the veracity of Audisio's account, have advanced a wide variety of theories and speculation as to how Mussolini died and who was responsible. At least twelve different individuals have, at various times, been claimed to be the killer. These have included Luigi Longo and Sandro Pertini, who subsequently became general secretary of the Italian Communist Party and President of Italy respectively. Some writers believe that Mussolini's death was part of a Special Operations Executive operation, with the supposed aim of retrieving compromising "secret agreements" and correspondence with Winston Churchill that Mussolini had allegedly been carrying when he was captured. However, the "official" explanation, with Audisio as Mussolini's executioner, remains the most credible narrative.

== Preceding events ==
Italian Social Republic: in December 1943 in September 1944

=== Background ===
Mussolini had been Italy's Fascist leader since 1922, first as prime minister and, following his seizure of dictatorial powers in 1925, with the title Il Duce. In June 1940, he took the country into World War II on the side of Nazi Germany led by Adolf Hitler. Following the Allied invasion of Sicily in July 1943, Mussolini was deposed and put under arrest; Italy then signed the Armistice of Cassibile with the Allies in the following September.

Shortly after the Armistice, Mussolini was rescued from prison in the Gran Sasso raid by German special forces, and Hitler installed him as leader of the Italian Social Republic, a German puppet state set up in northern Italy and based at the town of Salò near Lake Garda. By 1944, the "Salò Republic", as it came to be called, was threatened not only by the Allies advancing from the south but also internally by Italian anti-fascist partisans, in a brutal conflict that was to become known as the Italian Civil War.

Slowly fighting their way up the Italian Peninsula, the Allies took Rome and then Florence in the summer of 1944 and later that year they began advancing into northern Italy. With the Spring 1945 offensive in Italy bringing a final collapse of the German army's Gothic Line in April, total defeat for the Salò Republic and its German protectors was imminent.

=== Final days: 18–27 April 1945 ===
On 18 April 1945, in an attempt to escape the now certain defeat of the Italian Social Republic and still hoping for a revival among his men with the possibility of negotiating a conditional surrender agreement, Mussolini abandoned the isolated headquarters of Palazzo Feltrinelli in Gargnano, located on the western shore of Lake Garda, and moved to Milan. He arrived in the evening, taking lodgings at the prefecture; the previous day he had discussed in the last council of ministers the possible resistance in the Ridotto Alpino Repubblicano. The purpose of the move appears to have been to prepare for final defeat. His new location would put him in closer proximity to the Archbishop of Milan, Cardinal Schuster, whom he hoped to use as an intermediary to negotiate with the Allies and the partisans. Additionally, it was better placed for an escape to the Swiss border.

On 22 April, in the courtyard of the prefecture, Mussolini delivered his final speech to a hundred officers of the Republican Guard, concluding: "If the Fatherland is lost, there is no point in living." With the military situation deteriorating, Mussolini vacillated between a number of options including making a last stand in the Valtellina, a valley in the Italian Alps (the so-called Ridotto Alpino Repubblicano plan), or attempting to negotiate a peaceful handover to the partisan leadership, the CLNAI. (Note: The CNLAI or Comitato di Liberazione Nazionale Alta Italia (National Liberation Committee for Upper Italy) was the collective political-military leadership of the main partisan groups operating in northern Italy. It comprised representatives of the five main anti-fascist political parties: the Italian Communist Party, the Action Party, the Italian Socialist Party, the Christian Democrats and the Liberal Party. Each party controlled a partisan force, the largest being the Communists followed by the Action Party. The CLNAI was established in January 1944 to co-ordinate the activities of these partisan groups, but soon claimed to be the legitimate political authority in northern Italy. Although initially resistant, the Allies eventually recognised this claim and left the maintenance of public order in the liberated areas to the CLNAI. In March 1945 the CLNAI had 80,000 partisans under its control and this had risen to 250,000 by the end of April 1945.) That evening he met Carlo Silvestri and handed him a declaration addressed to the executive committee of the Italian Socialist Party of Proletarian Unity, in which he demanded that the Italian Social Republic pass into republican rather than monarchist or socialist hands. As the German forces retreated, the CLNAI called for a general uprising in the main northern cities. It also issued a decree establishing popular courts, which included in its provisions what, in practice, would be Mussolini's death sentence:

Flight from Milan

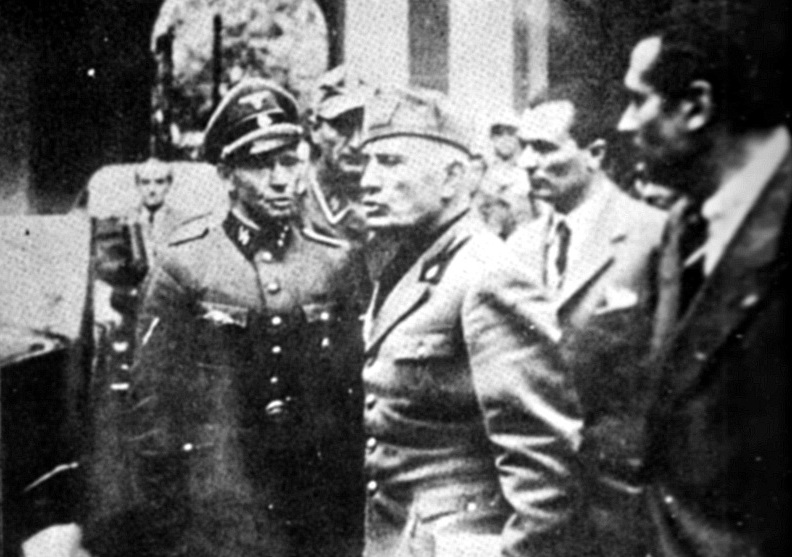
Mussolini at the Prefecture in Milan on the afternoon of 25 April 1945 (believed to be the last photograph of him alive)

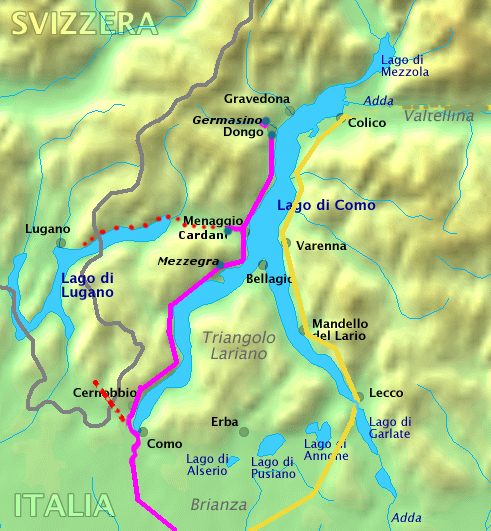
Mussolini's route
Swiss border crossings
Direct route to Valtellina

Members of the Fascist government and the gerarchi (Note: Gerarchi can be translated as "fascist leaders". See Gerarca.) of fascism who are guilty of suppressing constitutional guarantees, destroying popular liberties, creating the Fascist regime, compromising and betraying the fate of the country, and leading it to the present catastrophe are to be punished with the penalty of death, and in less serious instances life imprisonment.

— CLNAI, Decree issued 25 April 1945, Art. 5

On the afternoon of 25 April, through the mediation of Cardinal Alfredo Ildefonso Schuster, Archbishop of Milan, a decisive meeting took place at the archbishop’s palace between a Fascist delegation, composed of Mussolini, Undersecretary Francesco Maria Barracu, and Ministers Paolo Zerbino and Rodolfo Graziani, and a delegation of the National Liberation Committee led by Raffaele Cadorna. Meanwhile, a general strike was underway in Milan and the order for a general insurrection was imminent. During the meeting, Mussolini learned that the Germans had already begun separate negotiations with the National Liberation Committee; the only proposal presented to him was therefore "unconditional surrender." An agreement briefly seemed possible, as guarantees were offered for the Fascists and their families, however, Mussolini was enraged after learning that the Germans were negotiating with the partisans without his knowledge. He abruptly left the negotiations after telling Schuster he was going to confront the German SS leader Karl Wolff for his "betrayal" and promised he would return with his answer by 8 p.m.

At 8 p.m., after the leaders of the Italian Resistance gave the order for a general insurrection, Mussolini decided to flee the city and headed north toward Lake Como. At 9:30 p.m., Mussolini arrived at the prefecture of Como. During the night, the local authorities ruled out the possibility of a prolonged stay in the city, considering it indefensible. Rodolfo Graziani advised returning to Milan, while the majority—particularly Guido Buffarini Guidi and Angelo Tarchi, insisted on entering Switzerland, even illegally. On the advice of the Federal Secretary of Como, Paolo Porta, it was decided to continue toward Menaggio.

Around four in the morning on 26 April, after sending a letter to his wife, Mussolini's convoy hastily left Como, heading north along the western shore of Lake Como via the Regina road. It reached Menaggio at about 5:30 a.m. without incident. There, discussions continued over what to do next, as other fleeing Fascists arrived and news of their presence quickly spread. Rodolfo Graziani again insisted on turning back; when ignored, he departed on his own toward Como. It was decided to leave Menaggio and delay further decisions. In an attempt to avoid the German gendarmerie, the convoy turned west into Val Menaggio, heading for Cardano al Campo, a hamlet of Grandola ed Uniti, where the 53rd Company of the Border Militia was stationed in the former Miravalle Hotel.

In Cardano, Mussolini was joined by his lover Claretta Petacci and her brother, as well as by a German escort ordered by Hitler to accompany him to Germany. He was informed that a transport plane was ready to depart from Chiavenna to help him escape. That evening came news that Ministers Guido Buffarini Guidi and Angelo Tarchi, along with Domenico Saletta, vice-commissioner of the prefecture of Como, had been arrested by partisans in Porlezza while attempting to cross the border. Radio broadcasts announced that Milan had been fully liberated and that those responsible for the national defeat, if found armed, would face the death penalty. Unable to proceed further and recognizing the small garrison’s vulnerability to partisan attack, the group returned to Menaggio. During the night, Alessandro Pavolini arrived in Menaggio alongside a retreating German military convoy composed of thirty-eight trucks and around two hundred German anti-aircraft soldiers under the command of Lieutenant Willy Flamminger, heading for Merano via the Stelvio Pass.

In the days before his death, Mussolini was in contact with American intelligence, specifically with the agent "Don Jones", who was working with partisans in Switzerland, explaining that he wished to surrender to them. Given that there was no way to get Mussolini to Switzerland and Allen Dulles lacked adequate forces to protect him from the partisans (if they had managed to capture him in Italy), he instructed Jones not to take action. After Mussolini's death, Dulles himself remarked: "Mussolini was captured and hanged, which in my view was probably a better solution than a trial."

=== Capture by the partisans, 27 April 1945 ===
The column, about a kilometre long, set off from Menaggio at five in the morning on 27 April. But at seven, just after passing the town of Musso, the military convoy was stopped at a Garibaldi Brigade roadblock near Dongo; after a brief exchange of fire and following lengthy negotiations, the Germans obtained permission to continue on condition that an inspection was carried out and that all the Italians present in the convoy were handed over. Mussolini, on the advice of his SS escort chief, Second Lieutenant Fritz Birzer, donned a Wehrmacht non-commissioned officer's overcoat and helmet and climbed into truck number 34, hiding at the back of the truck near the driver's cabin, covered by a military blanket. No other Italian was allowed to attempt to secretly follow Mussolini in the convoy. During the inspection, Mussolini was discovered by the partisan Giuseppe Negri hidden under a bench in truck number 34. After being recognized by the brigade’s deputy commissioner, Urbano Lazzaro, he was immediately disarmed of his Glisenti pistol, arrested, and taken into custody by Lazzaro, who escorted him to the town hall, where the bag in his possession was confiscated. Lazzaro later said that:

His face was like wax and his stare glassy, but somehow blind. I read utter exhaustion, but not fear ... Mussolini seemed completely lacking in will, spiritually dead.

All the other Italian members of the group were arrested; they numbered more than fifty people, in addition to the wives and children accompanying them. Among them were most members of the Republican government, as well as several political, military, and social figures with their families. Some surrendered spontaneously, while others attempted to buy their escape by offering large sums of money and valuables to the local population. In all, over fifty Fascist leaders and their families were found in the convoy and arrested by the partisans. The occupants of an armored car tried to resist, engaging in a shoot-out; Pietro Corradori and Alessandro Pavolini escaped by throwing themselves into the lake, but they were recaptured, and Pavolini was wounded.

Following his capture, the partisans took Mussolini to the town hall of Dongo, where he was greeted by the town mayor, Giulio Rubini. After being questioned by Rubini and others, Mussolini was then joined by four members of the convoy that had also been captured by the partisans: Francesco Maria Barracu, Idreno Utimpergher, Vito Casalinuovo, and Paolo Porta, all of whom saluted Mussolini upon entering the room. Pavolini, severely wounded, was later brought to the room, where he likewise gave the Fascist salute to Mussolini. Clara Petacci was captured in the car of her brother, Marcello Petacci, who claimed to be a Spanish consul and denied anything to do with the convoy. She was then taken to a ground floor room in the town hall.

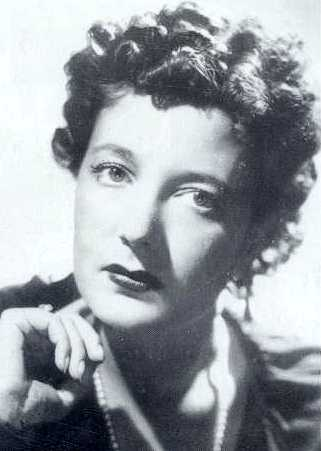
Clara Petacci, Mussolini's mistress, was captured and executed with him.

Pier Luigi Bellini delle Stelle, commander of the "Puecher" detachment of the 52nd Garibaldi Brigade, feared that Mussolini might be lynched by a local mob or rescued by the Germans, so late in the afternoon he took him to the abandoned barracks of the Guardia di Finanza in Germasino. In a conversation with Bellini delle Stelle and other partisans, Mussolini accused Hitler of treachery while describing Joseph Stalin as the real victor of the war and "one of the greatest living men". He also asked Bellini delle Stelle to send his regards to the lady travelling with the "Spanish gentlemen". Before going to bed at 11.30pm, at the request of the partisans on guard, Mussolini signed a declaration:

The 52nd Garibaldi Brigade captured me today, Friday 27 April, in the square of Dongo. The treatment I received during and after the capture was correct.

— Benito Mussolini

After confronting her, Clara Petacci admitted her real identity to Bellini delle Stelle and made a request to rejoin Mussolini, which was granted. Petacci joined Mussolini at 2:30 a.m. on 28 April; Bellini delle Stelle then transported them to the nearby farm of a peasant family named De Maria in Bonzanigo, leaving them under the watch of two young guards before returning to Dongo to report back to the Communist Party in Milan.

On the evening of Mussolini's capture, Sandro Pertini, the Socialist partisan leader in northern Italy, announced his arrest on Radio Milano Libertà:

The head of this association of delinquents, Mussolini, while yellow with rancour and fear and trying to cross the Swiss frontier, has been arrested. He must be handed over to a tribunal of the people so it can judge him quickly. We want this, even though we think an execution platoon is too much of an honour for this man. He would deserve to be killed like a mangy dog.

=== Order to execute ===
Differing accounts exist of who made the decision that Mussolini should be summarily executed. Palmiro Togliatti, the Secretary-General of the Communist Party, claimed that he had ordered Mussolini's execution prior to his capture. Togliatti said he had done so by a radio message on 26 April 1945 with the words:

Only one thing is needed to decide that they [Mussolini and the other Fascist leaders] must pay with their lives: the question of their identity.

He also claimed that he had given the order as deputy prime minister of the government in Rome and as leader of the Communist Party. Ivanoe Bonomi, the prime minister, later denied that this was said with his government's authority or approval.

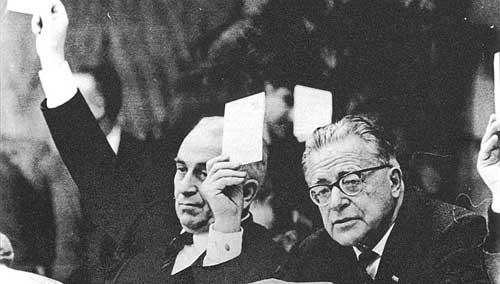
Luigi Longo (left) and Palmiro Togliatti at a Communist Party congress after the war

A senior communist in Milan, Luigi Longo, said that the order came from the General Command of the partisan military units "in application of a CLNAI decision". Longo subsequently gave a different story: he said that when he and Fermo Solari, a member of the Action Party (which was part of the CLNAI), heard the news of Mussolini's capture they immediately agreed that he should be summarily executed and Longo gave the order for it to be carried out. According to Leo Valiani, the Action Party representative on the CLNAI, the decision to execute Mussolini was taken on the night of 27/28 April by a group acting on behalf of the CLNAI comprising himself, Sandro Pertini, and the communists Emilio Sereni and Luigi Longo. The CLNAI subsequently announced, on the day after his death, that Mussolini had been executed on its orders.

In any event, Longo instructed a communist partisan of the General Command, Walter Audisio, to go immediately to Dongo to carry out the order. According to Longo, he did so with the words "go and shoot him". Longo asked another partisan, Aldo Lampredi, to go as well because, according to Lampredi, Longo thought Audisio was "impudent, too inflexible and rash".

== Shooting, 28 April 1945 ==
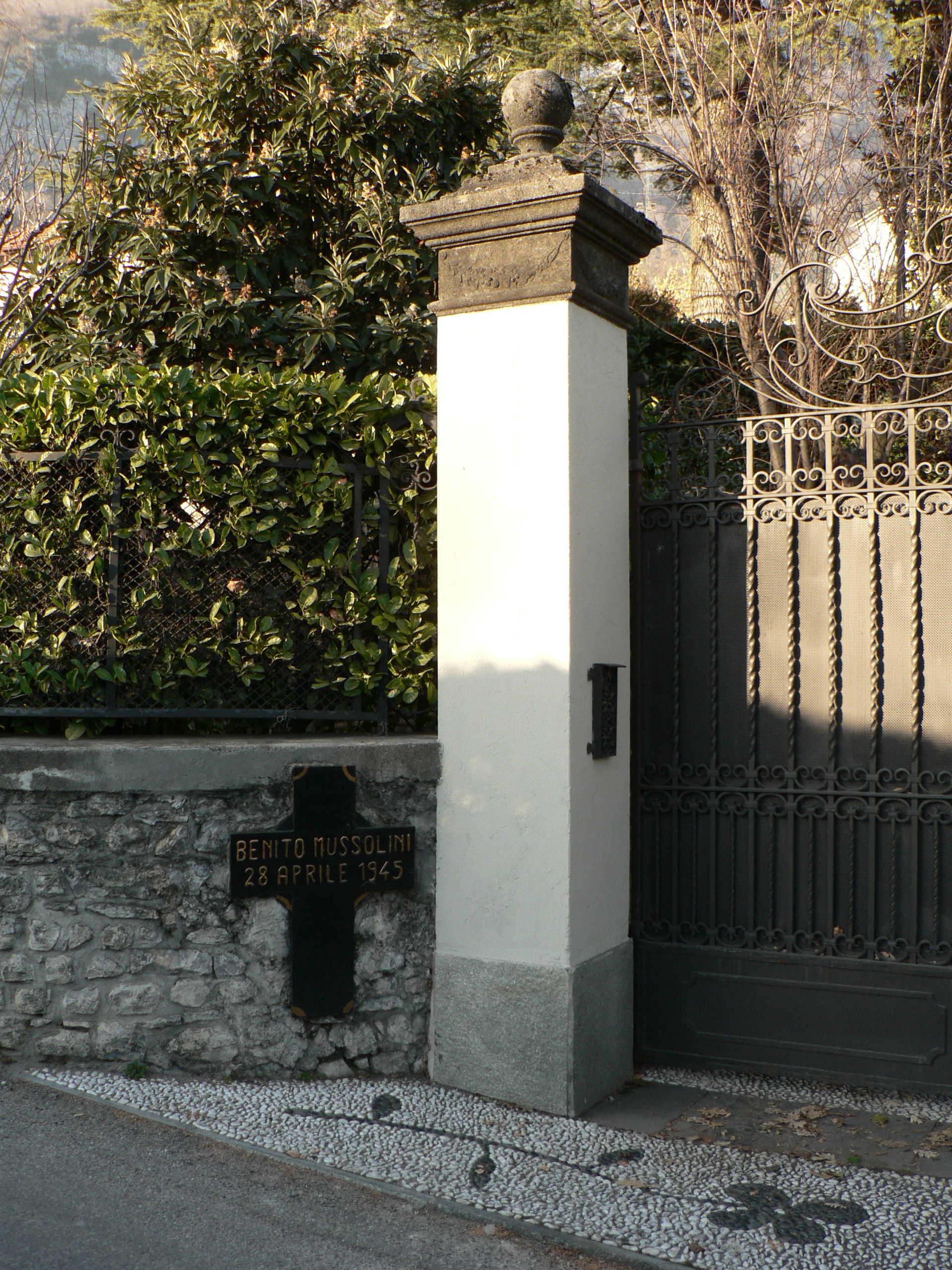
Site of execution: entrance to the Villa Belmonte

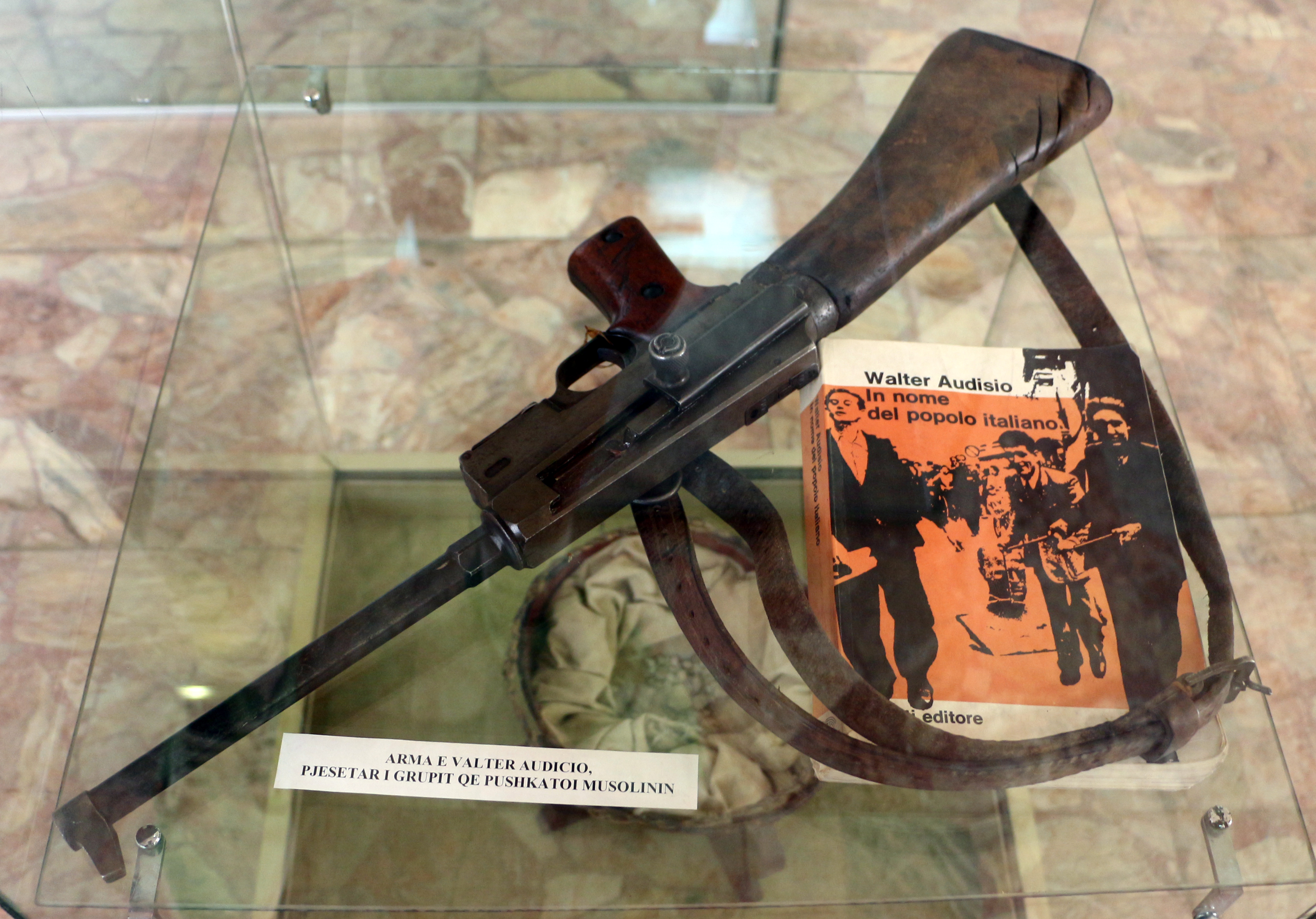
Moretti's MAS-38 submachine gun, said to have been used by Audisio

Although several conflicting versions and theories of how Mussolini and Petacci died were put forward after the war, the account of Walter Audisio, or at least its essential components, remains the most credible and is sometimes referred to in Italy as the "official version".

It was largely confirmed by an account provided by Aldo Lampredi and the classical narrative of the story was set out in books written in the 1960s by Bellini delle Stelle and Urbano Lazzaro, and the journalist Franco Bandini. Although each of these accounts vary in detail, they are consistent on the main facts.

Audisio and Lampredi left Milan for Dongo early on the morning of 28 April 1945 to carry out the orders Audisio had been given by Longo. On arrival in Dongo, they met Bellini delle Stelle, who was the local partisan commander, to arrange for Mussolini to be handed over to them. Audisio used the nom de guerre of "Colonnello Valerio" during his mission. In the afternoon, he, with other partisans, including Aldo Lampredi and Michele Moretti, drove to the De Maria family's farmhouse to collect Mussolini and Petacci. After they were picked up, they drove 20 kilometres (12 mi) south to the village of Giulino di Mezzegra. The vehicle pulled up at the entrance of the Villa Belmonte on a narrow road known as via XXIV maggio and Mussolini and Petacci were told to get out and stand by the villa's wall. Audisio then shot them at 4:10 p.m. with a MAS-38 submachine gun borrowed from Moretti, his own gun having jammed. There were differences in Lampredi's account and that of Audisio. Audisio presented Mussolini as acting in a cowardly manner immediately prior to his death whereas Lampredi did not. Audisio said he read out a sentence of death, whereas Lampredi omitted this. Lampredi said that Mussolini's last words were "aim at my heart". In Audisio's account, Mussolini said nothing immediately prior to or during the execution.

Differences also exist with the account given by others involved, including Lazzaro and Bellini delle Stelle. According to the latter, when he met Audisio in Dongo, Audisio asked for a list of the Fascist prisoners that had been captured the previous day and marked Mussolini's and Petacci's names for execution. Bellini delle Stelle said he challenged Audisio as to why Petacci should be executed. Audisio replied that she had been Mussolini's adviser, had inspired his policies and was "just as responsible as he is". According to Bellini delle Stelle no other discussion or formalities concerning the decision to execute them took place.

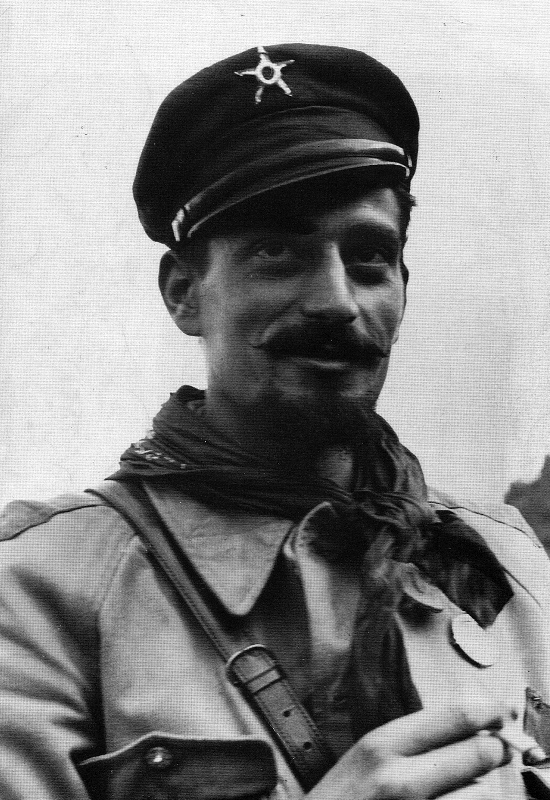
Pier Luigi Bellini delle Stelle

Audisio gave a different account. He claimed that on 28 April he convened a "war tribunal" in Dongo comprising Lampredi, Bellini delle Stelle, Michele Moretti and Lazzaro with himself as president. The tribunal condemned Mussolini and Petacci to death. There were no objections to any of the proposed executions. Urbano Lazzaro later denied that such a tribunal had been convened and said:

I was convinced Mussolini deserved death ... but there should have been a trial according to law. It was very barbarous.

In a book he wrote in the 1970s, Audisio argued that the decision to execute Mussolini taken at the meeting in Dongo of the partisan leaders on 28 April constituted a valid judgment of a tribunal under Article 15 of the CNLAI's ordinance on the Constitution of Courts of War. However, the lack of a judge or a Commissario di Guerra (required by the ordinance to be present) casts doubt on this assertion. (Note: After the war the family of Claretta Petacci began civil and criminal court cases against Walter Audisio for her unlawful killing. After a lengthy legal process, an investigating judge eventually closed the case in 1967 and acquitted Audisio of murder and embezzlement on the ground that the actions complained of occurred as an act of war against the Germans and the Fascists during a period of enemy occupation.)

== Subsequent events ==
During his dictatorship, representations of Mussolini's body—for example pictures of him engaged in physical labour either bare-chested or half-naked—formed a central part of Fascist propaganda. His body remained a potent symbol after his death, causing it to be either revered by supporters or treated with contempt and disrespect by opponents, and assuming a broader political significance.

=== Piazzale Loreto ===
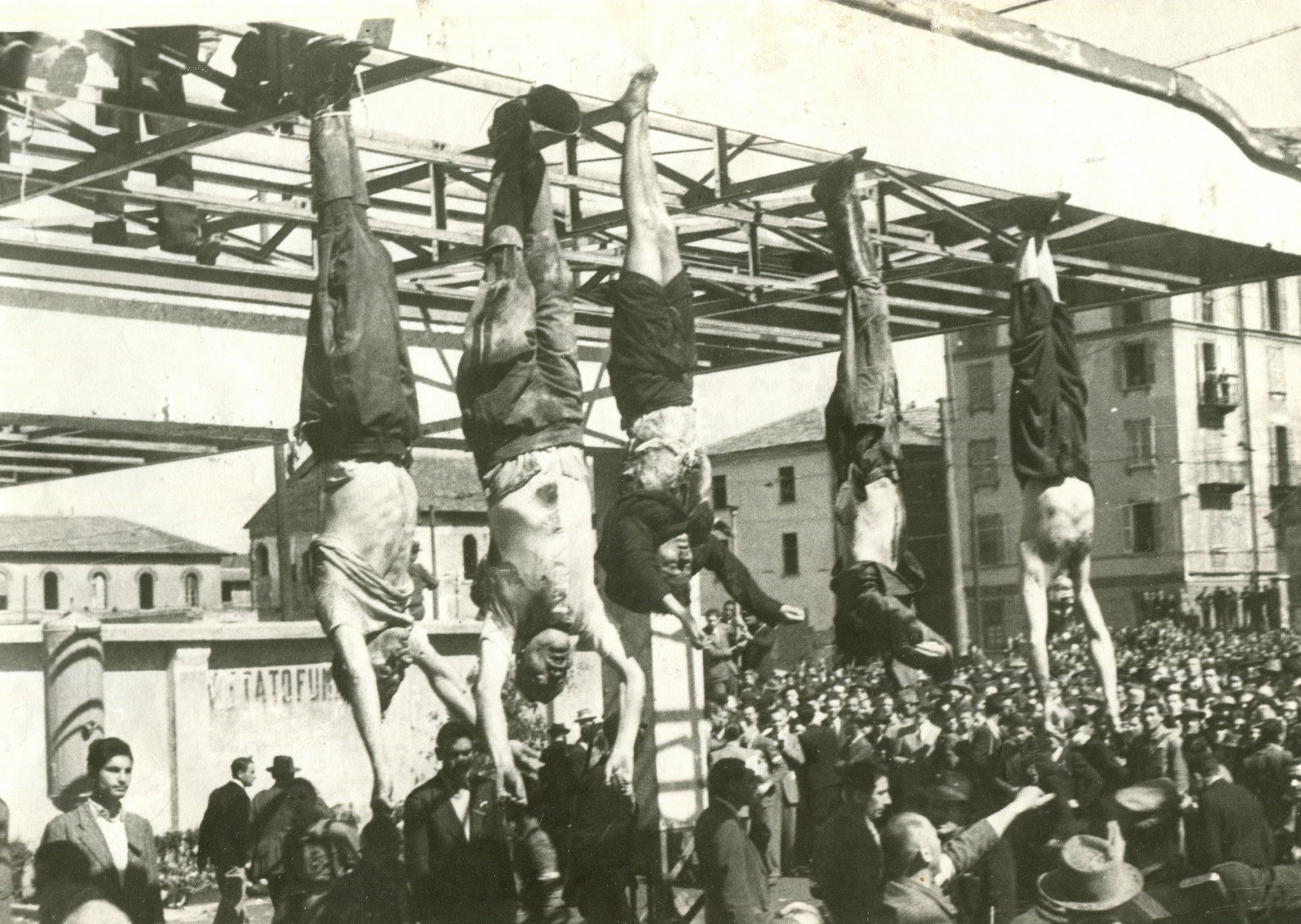
The corpse of Mussolini (second from left) next to Petacci (middle) and other executed Fascists in Piazzale Loreto, Milan, 1945

On the evening of 28 April, the bodies of Mussolini, Petacci, and the other executed Fascists were loaded into a van and transported south to Milan. Upon arriving in the city in the early hours of 29 April, they were dumped on the ground in the Piazzale Loreto, a suburban square near the main railway station. The choice of location was deliberate. Fifteen partisans had been shot there in August 1944 in retaliation for partisan attacks and Allied bombing raids, and their bodies had then been left on public display. At the time, Mussolini is said to have remarked "for the blood of Piazzale Loreto, we shall pay dearly".

Their bodies were left in a heap, and by 9:00 a.m. a considerable crowd had gathered. The corpses were pelted with vegetables, spat at, urinated on, shot at and kicked; Mussolini's face was disfigured by beatings. Allied forces began arriving in the city during the course of the morning and an American eyewitness described the crowd as "sinister, depraved, out of control". After a while, the bodies were hung by their feet from the metal girder framework of a half-built service station. This mode of hanging had been used in northern Italy since medieval times to stress the "infamy" of the hanged. However, the reason given by those involved in hanging Mussolini and the others in this way was to protect the bodies from the mob. Movie footage of what happened appears to confirm that to be the case.

=== Mortuary and post mortem ===
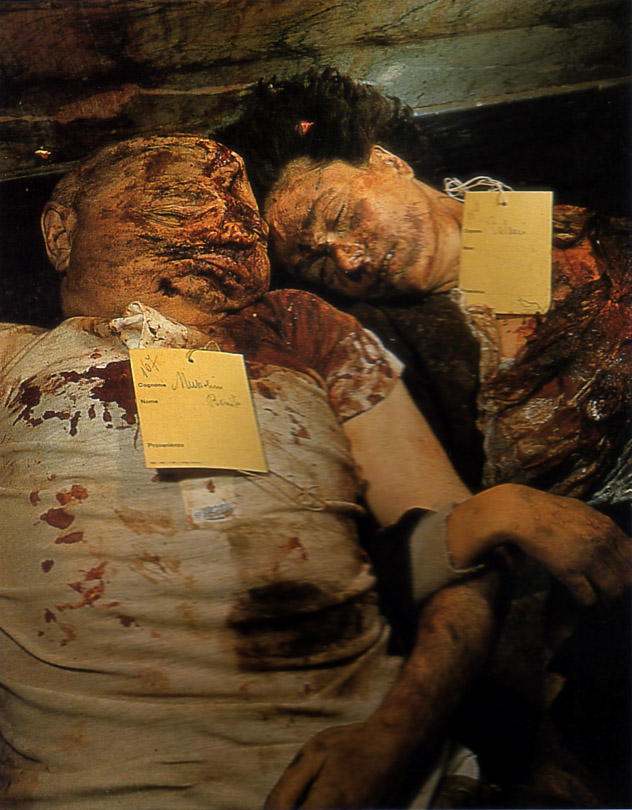
The bodies of Mussolini and Petacci photographed by a US army cameraman in the Milan city mortuary

At about 2:00 p.m. on 29 April, the recently arrived American military authorities ordered that the bodies be taken down and delivered to the city mortuary for post mortems to be carried out. A US army cameraman went to the mortuary and took photographs of the bodies for publication, including one with Mussolini and Petacci positioned in a macabre pose as though they were arm-in-arm.

On 30 April, a post mortem was carried out on Mussolini at the Institute of Legal Medicine in Milan. One version of the subsequent report indicated that he had been shot with nine bullets, while another version specified seven bullets. Four bullets near the heart were given as the cause of death. The calibres of the bullets were not identified. Samples of Mussolini's brain were taken and sent to the United States for analysis. The intention was to prove the hypothesis that syphilis had caused insanity in him, but nothing resulted from the analysis. No evidence of syphilis was found on Mussolini's body and no post mortem was carried out on Petacci.

=== Impact on Hitler ===
On the afternoon of 29 April, Adolf Hitler learned of Mussolini's death, although it is unknown how much of the detail was communicated to him. Earlier that day, Hitler had recorded in his Last Will and Testament that he intended to choose death rather than be captured by the enemy or fall into the hands of "the masses" to become "a spectacle arranged by Jews". The following day, Hitler killed himself in Berlin, shortly before the city fell to the Red Army. In accordance with Hitler's prior instructions, his body was immediately burned with petrol, leaving virtually no remains.

Some historians believe that what happened to Mussolini was a factor in Hitler's decision to take his own life and have his body burned. Alan Bullock said that news of Mussolini's fate had presumably increased Hitler's determination to avoid capture and William L. Shirer thought that knowledge of the events surrounding Mussolini's death may have strengthened Hitler's resolve not to risk his downfall being turned into a public humiliation. However, Hugh Trevor-Roper believed that this was improbable as it was unlikely that the details would have been reported to Hitler and, in any event, he had already decided on his course of action. Ian Kershaw notes that while it is uncertain whether Hitler was told the details of Mussolini's death:

If he did learn of the full gory tale, it could have done no more than confirm his anxiety to take his own life before it was too late, and to prevent his body from being seized by his enemies.

=== Interment and theft of corpse ===
Following his death and the display of his corpse in Milan, Mussolini was buried in an unmarked grave in the Musocco cemetery, to the north of the city. On 21 April 1946, Easter Sunday, Mussolini's body was located and dug up by a young Fascist, Domenico Leccisi, and two friends. Over a period of sixteen weeks it was moved from place to place – the hiding places included a villa, a monastery and a convent – while the authorities searched for it. Eventually, in August, the body (with a leg missing) was tracked down to the Certosa di Pavia, a monastery not far from Milan. Two Franciscan friars were charged with assisting Leccisi to hide the body.

The authorities then arranged for the body to be hidden at a Capuchin monastery in the small town of Cerro Maggiore where it remained for the next eleven years. The whereabouts of the body was kept a secret, even from Mussolini's family. This remained the position until May 1957, when the newly appointed Prime Minister, Adone Zoli, agreed to Mussolini's re-interment at his place of birth in Predappio, in Romagna. Zoli, who also came from Predappio and knew Mussolini's widow, Rachele, was reliant on the far right to support him in Parliament. This included Leccisi himself, who was now a neo-fascist member of the Italian Parliament's Chamber of Deputies.

=== Tomb and anniversary of death ===
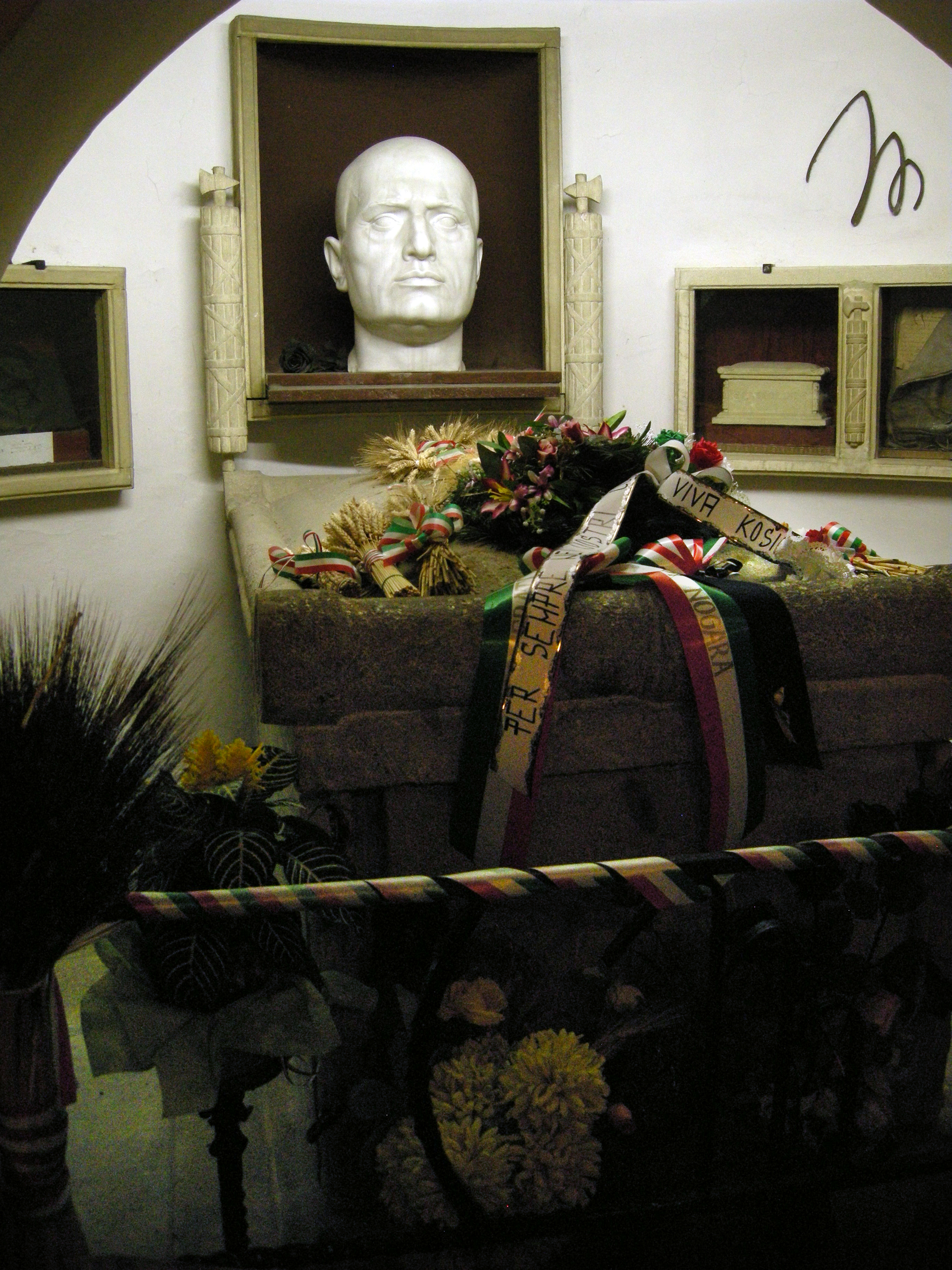
Mussolini's tomb in his family crypt, Predappio

The re-interment in the Mussolini family crypt in Predappio was carried out on 1 September 1957, with supporters present giving the Fascist salute. Mussolini was laid to rest in a large stone sarcophagus. (Note: As a post-script, in 1966 Mussolini's brain tissue samples, taken at the autopsy, were returned to his widow by St. Elizabeths psychiatric hospital in Washington DC, where they had been stored since 1945. She placed the samples in a box in the tomb, leading the historian John Foot to comment that "finally, after nineteen years after his execution, Benito Mussolini's mortal and restless remains were back in one place, and in more or less one piece". In 2009, it was reported that samples of Mussolini's brain and blood, stolen at the time of the autopsy, were offered for sale on eBay for 15,000 euros. eBay removed the listing shortly after it had been posted and no one had been able to bid. The hospital authorities said that all samples from the autopsy were destroyed in 1947.) The tomb is decorated with Fascist symbols and contains a large marble head of Mussolini. In front of the tomb is a register for visitors paying their respects to sign. The tomb has become a neo-fascist place of pilgrimage. The numbers signing the tomb's register range from dozens to hundreds per day, with thousands signing on certain anniversaries; almost all the comments left are supportive of Mussolini.

The anniversary of Mussolini's death on 28 April has become one of three dates neo-fascist supporters mark with major rallies. In Predappio, a march takes place between the centre of town and the cemetery. The event usually attracts supporters in the thousands and includes speeches, songs and people giving the Fascist salute.

== Post-war controversy ==
Outside of Italy, Audisio's version of how Mussolini was executed has largely been accepted and is uncontroversial. However, within Italy, the subject has been a matter of extensive debate and dispute since the late 1940s to the present and numerous theories of how Mussolini died have proliferated. At least 12 different individuals have been identified at various times as being responsible for carrying out the shooting. Comparisons have been made with the John F. Kennedy assassination conspiracy theories, and it has been described as the Italian equivalent of that speculation.

=== Reception of Audisio's version ===
Until 1947, Audisio's involvement was kept a secret, and in the earliest descriptions of the events (in a series of articles in the Communist Party newspaper L'Unità in late 1945) the person who carried out the shooting was only referred to as "Colonnello Valerio".

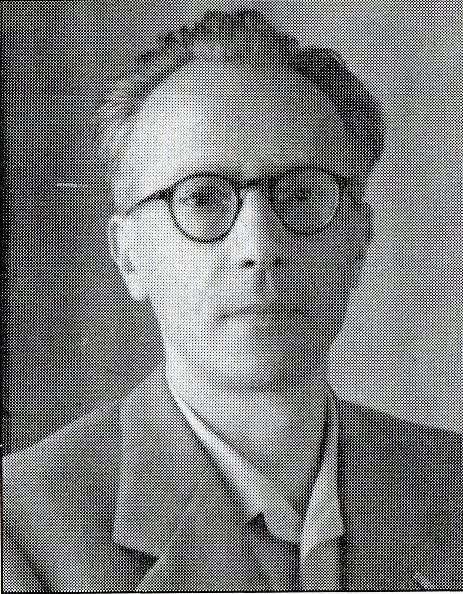
Aldo Lampredi accompanied Audisio on his mission and wrote an account of it in 1972.

Audisio was first named in a series of articles in the newspaper Il Tempo in March 1947 and the Communist Party subsequently confirmed Audisio's involvement. Audisio himself did not speak publicly about it until he published his account in a series of five articles in L'Unità later that month (and repeated in a book that Audisio later wrote which was published in 1975, two years after his death). Other versions of the story were also published, including, in the 1960s, two books setting out the "classical" account of the story: Dongo, la fine di Mussolini by Lazzaro and Bellini delle Stelle and Le ultime 95 ore di Mussolini by Franco Bandini.

Before long, it was noted that there were discrepancies between Audisio's original story published in L'Unità, subsequent versions that he provided and the versions of events provided by others. Although his account most probably is built around the facts, it was certainly embellished. The discrepancies and obvious exaggerations, coupled with the belief that the Communist Party had selected him to claim responsibility for their own political purposes, led some in Italy to believe that his story was wholly or largely untrue.

In 1996 a previously unpublished private account written in 1972 by Aldo Lampredi for the Communist Party's archives appeared in L'Unità. In it, Lampredi confirmed the key facts of Audisio's story but without the embellishments. Lampredi was undoubtedly an eyewitness and, because he prepared his narrative for the private records of the Communist Party and not for publication, it was perceived that he had no motivation other than to tell the truth. Furthermore, he had had a reputation for being reliable and trustworthy; he was also known to have disliked Audisio personally. For all these reasons it was seen as significant that he largely confirmed Audisio's account. After Lampredi's account was published, most, but not all, commentators were convinced of its veracity. The historian Giorgio Bocca commented:

it sweeps away all the bad novels constructed over 50 years on the end of the Duce of fascism .... There was no possibility that the many ridiculous versions put about in these years were true ... The truth is now unmistakably clear.

=== Claims by Lazzaro ===
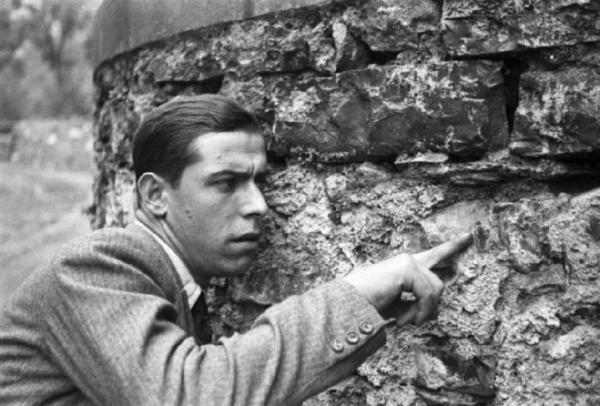
Urbano Lazzaro, 1945, indicating a bullet hole near the entrance to the Villa Belmonte

In his 1993 book Dongo: half a century of lies, the partisan leader Urbano Lazzaro repeated a claim he had made earlier that Luigi Longo, and not Audisio, was "Colonnello Valerio". He also claimed that Mussolini was inadvertently wounded earlier in the day when Petacci tried to grab the gun of one of the partisans, who killed Petacci and Michele Moretti then shot dead Mussolini.

=== The "British hypothesis" ===
There have been several claims that Britain's wartime covert operations unit, the Special Operations Executive (SOE), was responsible for Mussolini's death, and that it may have even been ordered by British Prime Minister Winston Churchill. Allegedly, it was part of a "cover up" to retrieve "secret agreements" and compromising correspondence between the two men, which Mussolini was carrying when he was captured by partisans. It is said that the correspondence included offers from Churchill of peace and territorial concessions in exchange for Mussolini persuading Hitler to join the western Allies in an alliance against the Soviet Union. Proponents of this theory have included historians such as Renzo De Felice and Pierre Milza and journalists including Peter Tompkins and Luciano Garibaldi; however, the theory has been dismissed by many.

In 1994 Bruno Lonati, a former partisan leader, published a book in which he claimed that he had shot Mussolini and he was accompanied on his mission by a British officer called "John", who shot Petacci. Tompkins claimed to have established that "John" was Robert Maccarrone, a British SOE agent of Sicilian descent. According to Lonati, he and "John" went to the De Maria farmhouse in the morning of 28 April and killed Mussolini and Petacci at about 11:00 a.m. In 2004, the Italian state television channel, RAI, broadcast a documentary, co-produced by Tompkins, in which the theory was put forward. Lonati was interviewed for the documentary and claimed that when he arrived at the farmhouse:

Petacci was sitting on the bed and Mussolini was standing. "John" took me outside and told me his orders were to eliminate them both, because Petacci knew many things. I said I could not shoot Petacci, so John said he would shoot her himself, while making it quite clear that Mussolini however, had to be killed by an Italian.

They took them out of the house and at the corner of a nearby lane they were stood against a fence and shot. The documentary included an interview with Dorina Mazzola who said that her mother had seen the shooting. She also said that she herself had heard the shots and that she "looked at the clock, it was almost 11". The documentary went on to claim that the later shootings at the Villa Belmonte were subsequently staged as part of the "cover up".

The theory has been criticised for lacking any serious evidence, particularly on the existence of the correspondence with Churchill. Commenting on the RAI television documentary in 2004, Christopher Woods, researcher for the official history of the SOE, dismissed these claims saying that "it's just love of conspiracy-making".

=== Other "earlier death" theories ===
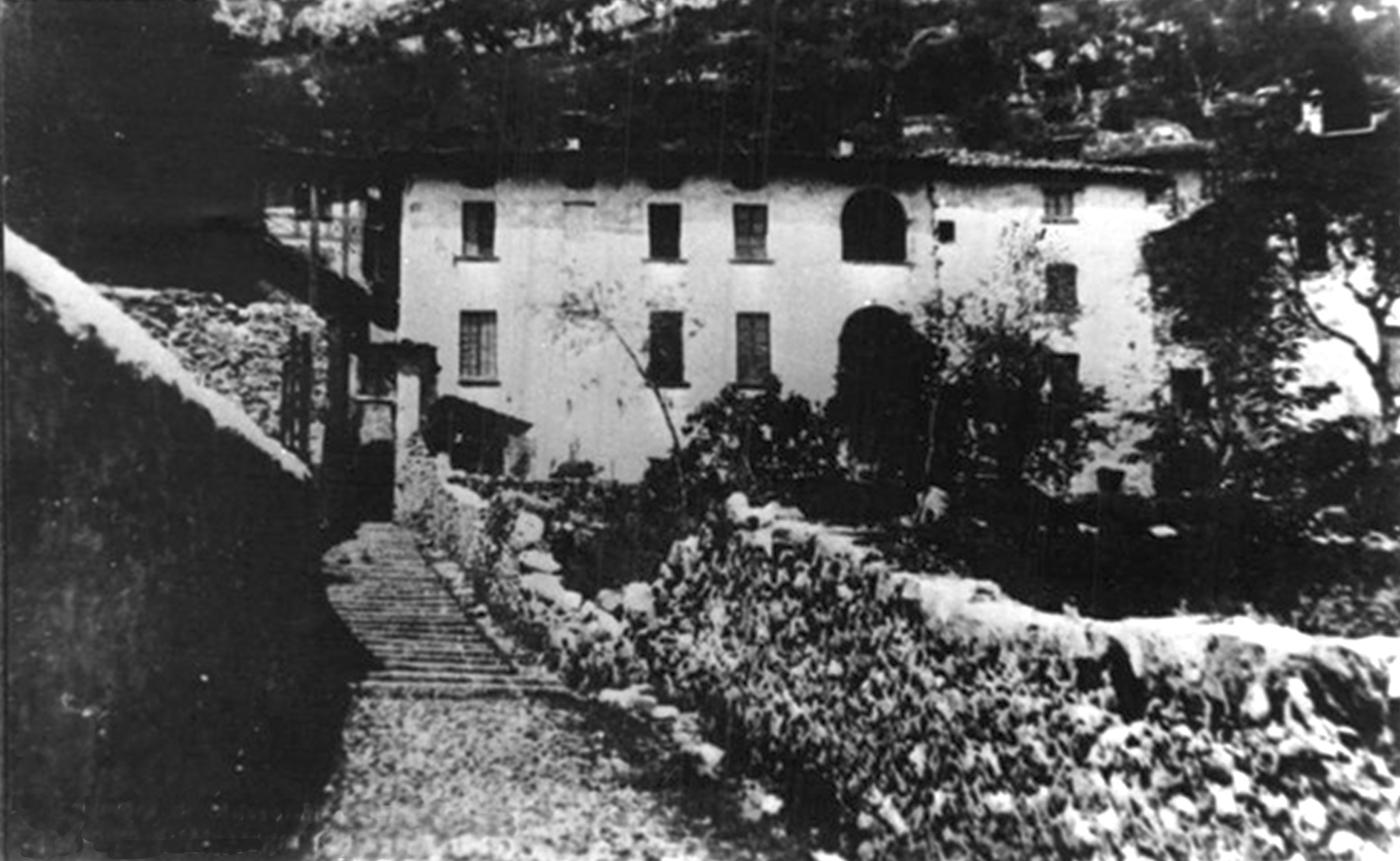
The De Maria farmhouse, c. 1945

Some, including most persistently the Fascist journalist Giorgio Pisanò, have claimed that Mussolini and Petacci were shot earlier in the day near the De Maria farmhouse and that the execution at Giulino de Mezzegra was staged with corpses. The first to put this forward was Franco Bandini in 1978.

=== Other theories ===
Other theories have been published, including allegations that not only Luigi Longo, subsequently leader of the Communist Party in post-war Italy, but also Sandro Pertini, a future President of Italy, carried out the shootings. Others have claimed that Mussolini (or Mussolini and Petacci together) committed suicide with cyanide capsules.

== See also ==
- "The Killers of Mussolini" (1959)
- Last Days of Mussolini (1974)

== Bibliography ==
=== Books ===
- Audisio, Walter (1975). In nome del popolo italiano. Teti (Italy). ISBN 978-88-7039-085-8.
- Bailey, Roderick (2014). Target: Italy: The Secret War Against Mussolini 1940–1943. Faber & Faber. ISBN 978-0-571-29920-1.
- Baima Bollone, Pierluigi (2005). Le ultime ore di Mussolini. Mondadori (Italy). ISBN 978-88-04-53487-7.
- Bandini, Franco (1978). Vita e morte segreta di Mussolini. Mondadori (Italy).
- Bellini delle Stelle, Pier Luigi; Lazzaro, Urbano (1962). Dongo ultima azione. Mondadori (Italy).
- Blinkhorn, Martin (2006). Mussolini and Fascist Italy. Routledge. ISBN 978-1-134-85214-7.
- Bosworth, R. J. B. (2014). Mussolini. Bloomsbury Publishing. ISBN 978-1-84966-444-8.
- Bullock, Alan (1962) [1952]. Hitler: A Study in Tyranny. Penguin Books. LCCN 63005065.
- Cavalleri, Giorgio; et al. (2009). La fine. Gli ultimi giorni di Benito Mussolini nei documenti dei servizi segreti americani (1945–1946). Garzanti (Italy). ISBN 978-88-11-74092-6.
- Clark, Martin (2014a). Mussolini. Routledge. ISBN 978-1-317-89840-5.
- Clark, Martin (2014b). Modern Italy, 1871 to the Present. Routledge. ISBN 978-1-317-86603-9.
- Di Bella, Maria Pia (2004). "From Future to Past: A Duce's Trajectory". In Borneman, John (ed.). Death of the Father: An Anthropology of the End in Political Authority. Berghahn Books. pp. 33–62. ISBN 978-1-57181-111-0.
- Di Rienzo, Eugenio (2023). Sotto altra bandiera: Antifascisti italiani al servizio di Churchill (in Italian). Neri Pozza. ISBN 978-88-545-2753-9.
- Duggan, Christopher (2008). The Force of Destiny: A History of Italy Since 1796. Houghton Mifflin Harcourt. ISBN 978-0-618-35367-5.
- Duggan, Christopher (2013). Fascist Voices: An Intimate History of Mussolini's Italy. Oxford University Press. ISBN 978-0-19-973078-0.
- Garibaldi, Luciano (2004). Mussolini: The Secrets of His Death. Enigma. ISBN 978-1-929631-23-0.
- Goeschel, Christian (2018). Mussolini and Hitler: The Forging of the Fascist Alliance. Yale University Press. ISBN 978-0-300-17883-8.
- Kershaw, Ian (2001) [2000]. Hitler, 1936–1945: Nemesis. Penguin. ISBN 978-0-14-027239-0.
- Kershaw, Ian (2008). Hitler: A Biography. W. W. Norton & Company. ISBN 978-0-393-06757-6.
- Lazzaro, Urbano (1993). Dongo: mezzo secolo di menzogne. Mondadori. ISBN 978-88-04-36762-8.
- Lonati, Bruno Giovanni (1994). Quel 28 aprile. Mussolini e Claretta: la verità. Mursia (Italy). ISBN 978-88-425-1761-0.
- Luzzatto, Sergio (2014). The Body of Il Duce: Mussolini's Corpse and the Fortunes of Italy. Henry Holt and Company. ISBN 978-1-4668-8360-4.
- Morgan, Philip (2008). The Fall of Mussolini: Italy, the Italians, and the Second World War. OUP Oxford. ISBN 978-0-19-157875-5.
- Moseley, Ray (2004). Mussolini: The Last 600 Days of Il Duce. Taylor Trade Publications. ISBN 978-1-58979-095-7.
- Neville, Peter (2014). Mussolini. Routledge. ISBN 978-1-317-61304-6.
- O'Reilly, Charles T. (2001). Forgotten Battles: Italy's War of Liberation, 1943–1945. Lexington Books. ISBN 978-0-7391-0195-7.
- Payne, Stanley G. (1996). A History of Fascism, 1914–1945. University of Wisconsin Press. ISBN 978-0-299-14873-7.
- Quartermaine, Luisa (2000). Mussolini's Last Republic: Propaganda and Politics in the Italian Social Republic (R.S.I.) 1943–45. Intellect Books. ISBN 978-1-902454-08-5.
- Roncacci, Vittorio (2003). La calma apparente del lago. Como e il Comasco tra guerra e guerra civile 1940–1945. Macchione (Italy). ISBN 978-88-8340-164-0.
- Sharp Wells, Anne (2013). Historical Dictionary of World War II: The War in Germany and Italy. Scarecrow Press. ISBN 978-0-8108-7944-7.
- Shirer, William L. (1960). The Rise and Fall of the Third Reich. Simon & Schuster. LCCN 60-6729.
- Tompkins, Peter (2001). Dalle carte segrete del Duce. Tropea (Italy). ISBN 978-88-438-0296-8.
- Trevor-Roper, Hugh R. (1995). The Last Days of Hitler. Palgrave Macmillan. ISBN 978-1-349-14104-3.

=== Newspaper articles, journals and websites ===
- Audisio, Walter (March 1947). "Missione a Dongo". L'Unità.:

"Missione a Dongo" (PDF). L'Unità. 25 March 1947. p. 1. Archived from the original (PDF) on 26 August 2014.;
"Missione a Dongo" (PDF). L'Unità. 25 March 1947. p. 2. Archived from the original (PDF) on 26 August 2014.;
"Solo a Como con 13 partigiani" (PDF). L'Unità. 26 March 1947. p. 1. Archived from the original (PDF) on 26 August 2014.;
"Solo a Como con 13 partigiani" (PDF). L'Unità. 26 March 1947. p. 2. Archived from the original (PDF) on 26 August 2014.;
"La corsa verso Dongo" (PDF). L'Unità. 27 March 1947. p. 1. Archived from the original (PDF) on 26 August 2014.;
"La corsa verso Dongo" (PDF). L'Unità. 27 March 1947. p. 2. Archived from the original (PDF) on 26 August 2014.;
"La fucilazione del dittatore" (PDF). L'Unità. 28 March 1947. p. 1. Archived from the original (PDF) on 26 August 2014.;
"La fucilazione del dittatore" (PDF). L'Unità. 28 March 1947. p. 2. Archived from the original (PDF) on 26 August 2014.;
"Epilogo a Piazzale Loreto" (PDF). L'Unità. 29 March 1947. p. 1. Archived from the original (PDF) on 26 August 2014.;
"Epilogo a Piazzale Loreto" (PDF). L'Unità. 29 March 1947. p. 2. Archived from the original (PDF) on 26 August 2014.

- BBC History. "Historic figures: Benito Mussolini (1883–1945)". BBC.
- Bompard, Paul (16 October 1995). "Did Churchill kill Il Duce?". Times Higher Education.
- Foot, John (1999). "The Dead Duce". History Today. 49 (8).
- Hooper, John (28 February 2006). "Urbano Lazzaro, The partisan who arrested Mussolini". The Guardian.
- Owen, Richard (28 August 2004). "Mussolini killed 'on Churchill's orders by British agents'". The Times.
- Samuel, Henry (2 September 2010). "Winston Churchill 'ordered assassination of Mussolini to protect compromising letters'". The Daily Telegraph. Archived from the original on 1 May 2013.
- Soloway, Benjamin (28 April 2015). "Did the Brutal Death of Mussolini Contribute to Hitler's Suicide?". Foreign Policy.
- Squires, Nick (21 November 2009). "Mussolini's brain 'stolen for sale on eBay'". The Daily Telegraph.
