= Michele Moretti =

Italian partisan

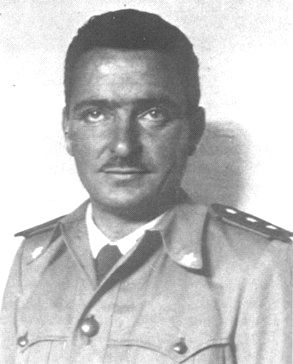
- Born: Michele Bruno Moretti; 26 March 1908; Como, Kingdom of Italy
- Died: 5 March 1995 (aged 86); Como, Italy
- Military career
- Allegiance: National Liberation Committee
- Branch: Garibaldi Brigades
- Service years: 1944–1945
- Rank: Political commissar
- Nickname: Pietro Gatti
- Commands: 52nd Garibaldi Brigade "Luigi Clerici"
- Conflicts: World War II: Italian Civil War
Association football career
- Position: Full-back
Senior career*
Years	Team	Apps	(Gls)
–1927	Esperia		
1927–1935	Como	165	(0)
1935–	Chiasso		
- * Club domestic league appearances and goals

Michele Bruno Moretti (Italian pronunciation: [miˈkɛːle moˈretti]; 26 March 1908 – 5 March 1995), also known by his nom-de-guerre Pietro Gatti, was an Italian partisan, trade unionist and footballer.

He was the political commissar of the 52nd Garibaldi Brigade "Luigi Clerici" which operated on Mount Berlinghera in the upper part of Lake Como, whose commander was Pier Luigi Bellini delle Stelle, who used the nom-de-guerre of "Pedro". In 1945, Moretti had an important role in the capture, detention and execution of Benito Mussolini and his mistress Clara Petacci. Some authors even consider him the main executor of the assassination.

== Early life and football career ==
Michele Bruno Moretti was born on 26 March 1908 in Como, Lombardy. His father was a railway worker who was fired in 1922 for embracing socialism. In his youth, Moretti began his football career as a full-back in the Esperia youth team. He then had a long career at Como before ending his career at Swiss club Chiasso.

At Como, he made 165 appearances starting from the 1927–28 Prima Divisione season. In the 1930–31 season, Como managed to win the competition without being defeated and was promoted to Serie B.

== Contributions to partisan and trade unionist groups ==
In the mid-1930s, Moretti, who was an employee of the Cartiere Burgo in Maslianico, joined the clandestine Communist Party. He was one of the main organizers of the first strike on 26 July 1943, then in 1944 in Como and its hinterland. He was later arrested by the Italian Social Republic police and deported to Germany. After managing to escape from the Sesto San Giovanni collection centre on 13 April 1944, he returned to Como, where he tried to organize a mass escape to the same camp where he had been confined. After hiding together with Luigi Clerici and Luigi Canali, Moretti with the nom de guerre of "Pietro Gatti" contributed to the formation of what would become the 52nd Garibaldi Brigade "Luigi Clerici", on the mountains of upper Lake Como where a partisan group had already formed, He held the position of first political commissar in the "Puecher" detachment of the 52nd Garibaldi Brigade "Luigi Clerici" since 1 January 1945, commanded by Pier Luigi Bellini delle Stelle who used the nom de guerre of "Pedro" after the assassination of Enrico Caronti "Romolo".

After the siege and capture suffered by the brigade, especially the commander Luigi Canali, Moretti tried to reorganize the resistance in the coastal towns and proposed Pier Luigi Bellini delle Stelle as military commander of the brigade, relinquishing the role initially given to him by the command of the Lombardy division.

On 17 April 1945 in Musso, Moretti took part in delicate negotiations with the commanders of the German motorized columns retreating north, since the partisan core forces at the road blockade were clearly inferior to the German ones. The negotiations ended in an agreement: the Germans could continue, on condition that they surrender the fascist troops following them, at the next checkpoint in Dongo, a few kilometres away. Among those captured, the partisan Urbano Lazzaro recognized Benito Mussolini, whose entourage included Clara Petacci and six ministers of the Italian Social Republic, as well as a number of other figures.

At about 3:00 a.m. on 28 April, Moretti was part of a small group of partisans who led Mussolini and Claretta Petacci to Bonzanigo, a hamlet in Mezzegra, to the De Maria family, supporters and old acquaintances of Neri's partisans.

== Major involvement in the death of Benito Mussolini ==
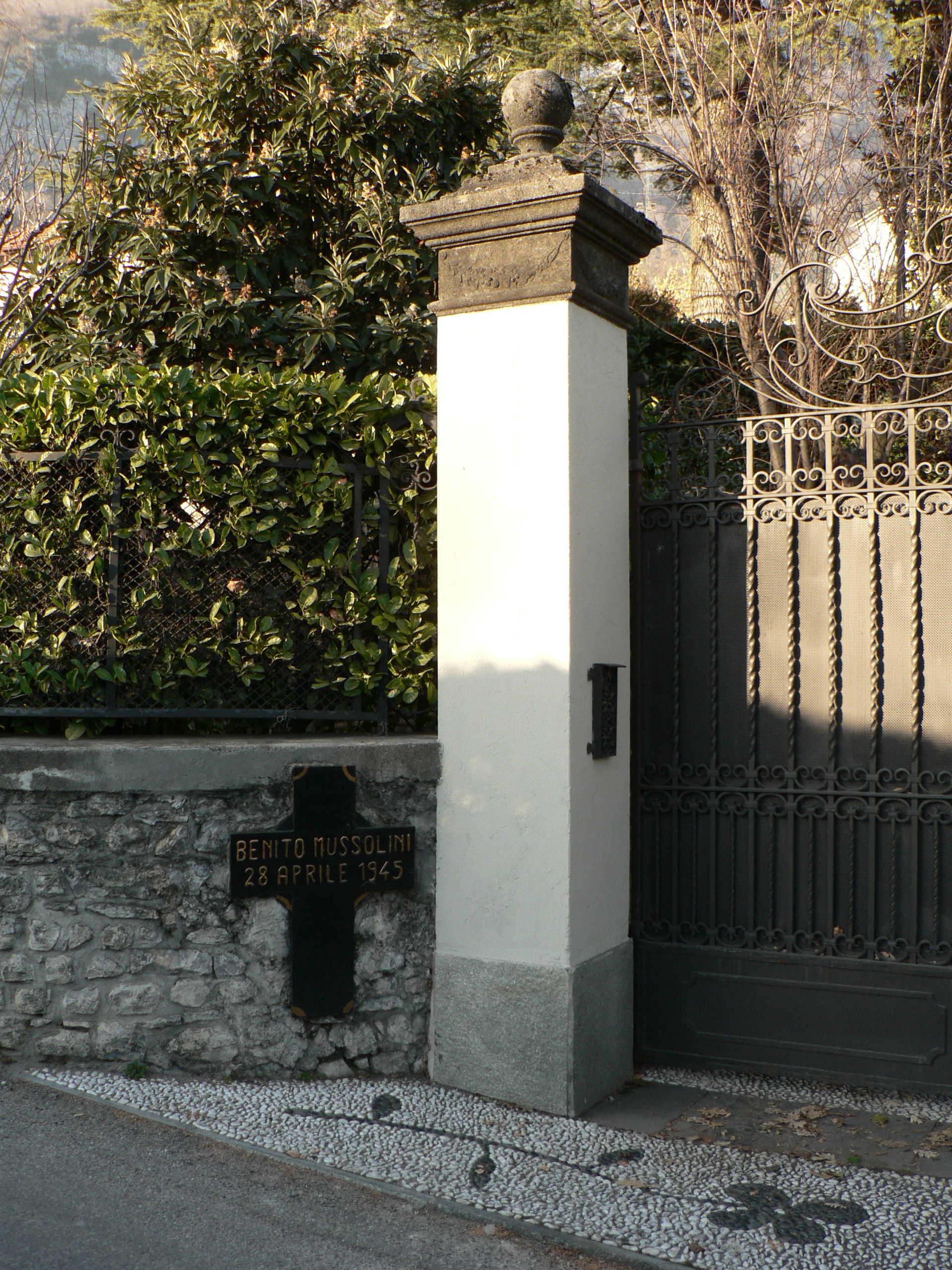
Site of execution: entrance to the Villa Belmonte

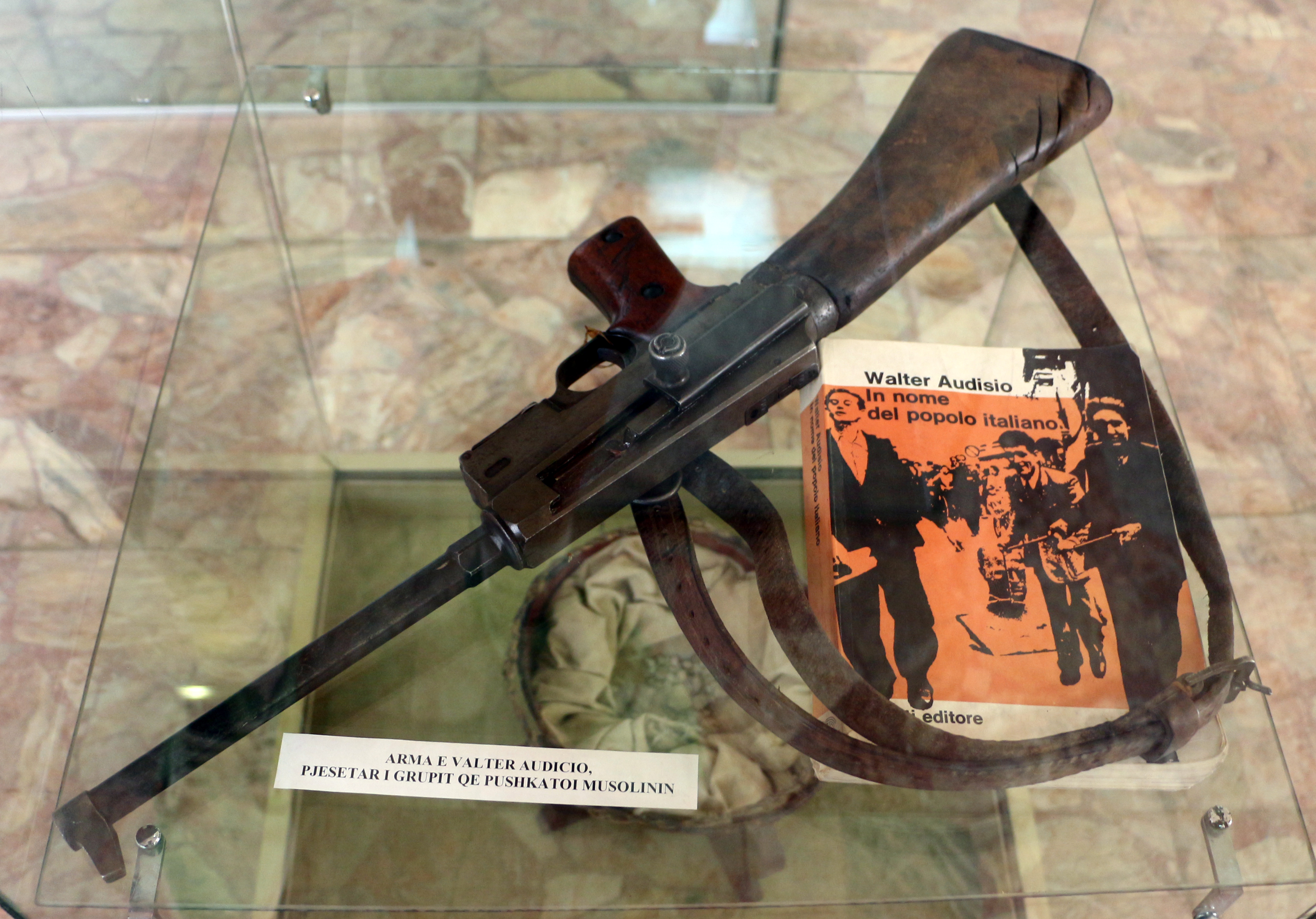
Moretti's MAS-38 submachine gun, said to have been used by Audisio.

=== Official version ===
Although several conflicting versions and theories of how the former dictator Benito Mussolini and his mistress Clara Petacci died were put forward after the war, the account of Walter Audisio, or at least its essential components, remains the most credible and is sometimes referred to in Italy as the "official version".

It was largely confirmed by an account provided by Aldo Lampredi and the classical narrative of the story was set out in books written in the 1960s by Bellini delle Stelle and Urbano Lazzaro, and the journalist Franco Baldini. Although each of these accounts vary in detail, they are consistent on the main facts.

Audisio and Lampredi left Milan for Dongo early on the morning of 28 April 1945 to carry out the orders Audisio had been given by Luigi Longo. On arrival in Dongo, they met Bellini delle Stelle, who was the local partisan commander, to arrange for Mussolini to be handed over to them. Audisio used the nom de guerre of "Colonnello Valerio" during his mission. In the afternoon, Audisio, with other partisans, including Michele Moretti and Aldo Lampredi, drove to the De Maria family's farmhouse to collect Mussolini and Petacci. After they were picked up, they drove 20 kilometres (12 mi) south to the village of Giulino di Mezzegra. The vehicle pulled up at the entrance of the Villa Belmonte on a narrow road known as via XXIV maggio and Mussolini and Petacci were told to get out and stand by the villa's wall. Audisio then shot them at 4:10 p.m. with a submachine gun borrowed from Moretti, his own gun having jammed. There were differences in Lampredi's account and that of Audisio. Audisio presented Mussolini as acting in a cowardly manner immediately prior to his death, whereas Lampredi did not. Audisio said he read out a sentence of death, whereas Lampredi omitted this. Lampredi said that Mussolini's last words were "aim at my heart". In Audisio's account, Mussolini said nothing immediately prior to or during the execution.

Differences also exist with the account given by others involved, including Lazzaro and Bellini delle Stelle. According to the latter, when he met Audisio in Dongo, Audisio asked for a list of the fascist prisoners that had been captured the previous day and marked Mussolini's and Petacci's names for execution. Bellini delle Stelle said he challenged Audisio as to why Petacci should be executed. Audisio replied that she had been Mussolini's adviser, had inspired his policies and was "just as responsible as he is". According to Bellini delle Stelle, no other discussion or formalities concerning the decision to execute them took place.

Audisio gave a different account. He claimed that on 28 April, he convened a "war tribunal" in Dongo comprising Lampredi, Bellini delle Stelle, Michele Moretti and Lazzaro with himself as president. The tribunal condemned Mussolini and Petacci to death. There were no objections to any of the proposed executions. Urbano Lazzaro later denied that such a tribunal had been convened and said:

I was convinced Mussolini deserved death ... but there should have been a trial according to law. It was very barbarous.

In a book he wrote in the 1970s, Audisio argued that the decision to execute Mussolini taken at the meeting in Dongo of the partisan leaders on 28 April constituted a valid judgment of a tribunal under Article 15 of the CNLAI's ordinance on the Constitution of Courts of War. However, the lack of a judge or a Commissario di Guerra (required by the ordinance to be present) casts doubt on this assertion. (Note: After the war the family of Claretta Petacci began civil and criminal court cases against Walter Audisio for her unlawful killing. After a lengthy legal process, an investigating judge eventually closed the case in 1967 and acquitted Audisio of murder and embezzlement on the ground that the actions complained of occurred as an act of war against the Germans and the fascists during a period of enemy occupation.)

=== Claims by Lazzaro ===
In his 1993 book Dongo: half a century of lies, the partisan leader Urbano Lazzaro repeated a claim he had made earlier that Luigi Longo and not Audisio was "Colonnello Valerio". He also claimed that Mussolini was inadvertently wounded earlier in the day when Petacci tried to grab the gun of one of the partisans, who killed Petacci and Michele Moretti then shot dead Mussolini.

== Personal life ==
Moretti married fellow Italian partisan Teresa Tettamanti, also known by the nom de guerre "Ada Piffaretti", on 14 October 1936. Together, they had a son named Fiorangelo.

In 1993, the Municipality of Como awarded him the Abbondino d'Oro, the highest civil award given to people who have made great contributions to the region.

== Honours ==
=== Association football ===
Como

- Prima Divisione: 1930–31

=== Orders ===
Municipality of Como

- Abbondino d'Oro: 1993

== See also ==
- Death of Benito Mussolini
- "The Killers of Mussolini" (1959)

== Bibliography ==
- Audisio, Walter (March 1947). "Missione a Dongo". L'Unità.
- Audisio, Walter (1975). In nome del popolo italiano. Teti (Italy). ISBN 978-88-7039-085-8.
- Baima Bollone, Pierluigi (2005). Le ultime ore di Mussolini. Mondadori (Italy). ISBN 978-88-04-53487-7.
- Bosworth, R. J. B. (2014). Mussolini. Bloomsbury Publishing. ISBN 978-1-84966-444-8.
- Cavalleri, Giorgio; et al. (2009). La fine. Gli ultimi giorni di Benito Mussolini nei documenti dei servizi segreti americani (1945–1946). Garzanti (Italy). ISBN 978-88-11-74092-6.
- Di Bella, Maria Pia (2004). "From Future to Past: A Duce's Trajectory". In Borneman, John (ed.). Death of the Father: An Anthropology of the End in Political Authority. Berghahn Books. ISBN 978-1-57181-111-0.
- Hooper, John (28 February 2006). "Urbano Lazzaro, The partisan who arrested Mussolini". The Guardian.
- Lazzaro, Urbano (1993). Dongo: mezzo secolo di menzogne. Mondadori. ISBN 978-88-04-36762-8.
- Luzzatto, Sergio (2014). The Body of Il Duce: Mussolini's Corpse and the Fortunes of Italy. Henry Holt and Company. ISBN 978-1-4668-8360-4.
- Moseley, Ray (2004). Mussolini: The Last 600 Days of Il Duce. Taylor Trade Publications. ISBN 978-1-58979-095-7.
