= Last Days of Mussolini =

1974 film by Carlo Lizzani

- Theatrical release poster
- Directed by: Carlo Lizzani
- Screenplay by: Carlo Lizzani; Fabio Pittorru; Beverley Cross
- Story by: Fabio Pittorru
- Produced by: Enzo Peri
- Starring: Rod Steiger; Franco Nero; Lisa Gastoni; Lino Capolicchio; Henry Fonda
- Cinematography: Roberto Gerardi
- Edited by: Franco Fraticelli
- Music by: Ennio Morricone
- Production company: Aquila Cinematografica
- Distributed by: Italnoleggio Cinematografico (Italy)
- Release date: 29 March 1974 (Italy)
- Running time: 135 minutes
- Country: Italy
- Languages: Italian; German; English

Last Days of Mussolini (Italian: Mussolini: Ultimo atto, lit. 'Mussolini: Final Act', also released as The Last 4 Days) is a 1974 Italian war film co-written and directed by Carlo Lizzani and starring Rod Steiger, Franco Nero and Lisa Gastoni. The film depicts the days leading up to the death of Benito Mussolini, the Italian dictator, when he attempted to flee Italy in April 1945 at the end of World War II in Europe.

== Plot ==
In April 1945, as the last allied offensive in Italy is underway, the Republic of Salò, the last bastion of fascism, is crumbling: the Americans, along with the partisans are advancing towards Milan. Benito Mussolini seeks the help of the Archbishop of Milan, Alfredo Ildefonso Schuster, to mediate for talks with the partisans.

Schuster hosts a meeting between Mussolini and representatives of the National Liberation Committee. Mussolini confuses them by proposing a transfer of power "to the Italian people"; antifascist organizations will only hear of an unconditional surrender. Mussolini is advised by Schuster to surrender, but refuses.

Having achieved nothing during these talks, Mussolini flees with a German escort, hoping to reach Switzerland; he is followed by his lover Clara Petacci and various loyal fascist officials. As his journey progresses, Mussolini is gradually separated from his followers who disperse or are captured by partisans. Mussolini is eventually persuaded by the Germans to disguise himself as a Wehrmacht officer. This allows him to avoid capture at a partisan checkpoint: per the NLC's agreements with the German army, the partisans let the Germans pass while seizing the Italian fascists who are abandoned to their deaths by Mussolini and the Germans.

Mussolini and Petacci manage to get to the northern village of Dongo, where Mussolini is recognized and arrested by partisans led by local resistance leader 'Pedro'. Groups within the National Liberation Committee debate whether to hand him over to the Americans, so that he undergoes due process. Ultimately, partisan officer 'Valerio' is sent by the NLC to take custody of Mussolini and shoot him, which he does in front of the Villa Belmonte, in the village of Giulino. The execution is largely improvised and almost botched when Valerio's machine gun suddenly jams. Petacci hysterically tries to shield Mussolini with her body and ends up being shot in the confusion, followed by Mussolini.

== Cast ==
- Rod Steiger as Benito Mussolini
- Franco Nero as Walter "Valerio" Audisio
- Lisa Gastoni as Clara Petacci
- Henry Fonda as Cardinal Alfredo Ildefonso Schuster
- Lino Capolicchio as Pier Luigi "Pedro" Bellini delle Stelle
- Massimo Sarchielli as Alessandro Pavolini
- Andrea Aureli as Francesco Maria Barracu
- Rodolfo Dal Pra as Rodolfo Graziani
- Giacomo Rossi Stuart as US Army Capt. Jack Donati
- Giuseppe Addobbati as Raffaele Cadorna Jr.
- Umberto Raho as Guido Leto
- Bruno Corazzari as SS-Untersturmführer Fritz Birzer
- Manfred Freyberger as SS-Hauptsturmführer Otto Kisnat
- Franco Balducci as Francesco Colombo
- Franco Mazzieri as Guido Buffarini Guidi
- Pietro Mazzinghi as Emilio Sereni
- Bill Vanders as Luftwaffe Leutnant Hans Fallmeyer
- Marco Guglielmi as Idreno Utimperghe
- Marvin Drake as Monsignor Giuseppe Bicchierai
- Luciano Pigozzi as Renato Celio
- Tom Felleghy and John Stacy as Allied Officials

== Savona bombing ==
On April 30, 1974, on the eve of May Day celebrations, a plastic bomb exploded in the center of Savona, a short distance from a cinema where the film was being shown, which had been greeted with anger by neo-fascists. It was the first of the so-called Savona bombs; the device, placed in the entrance hall of the building where Christian Democrat senator Franco Varaldo lived, caused extensive damage to the building but no injuries. A few days after the attack, the far-right terrorist organization Ordine Nero was identified as responsible.

== Bibliography ==
- De Santi, Gualtiero (2001). Carlo Lizzani. Rome: Gremese Editore. ISBN 978-8884400444.

== See also ==
- Lion of the Desert - A 1981 film, also starring Rod Steiger as Benito Mussolini
