= Michele Moretti (disambiguation) =

Michele Moretti may refer to:

- Michele Moretti (1908–1995), Italian partisan, trade unionist and footballer
- Michèle Moretti (born 1940), French actress
- Michel Moretti (born 1989), French football manager and former player
- Michele Morettini (born 1991), Italian cricketer
