= Paolo Porta =

Italian politician (1901–1945)

Federal Secretary of the Republican Fascist Party of Como
- In office 14 September 1943 – 26 April 1945

Regional Delegate of the Republican Fascist Party for Lombardy
- In office March 1944 – 26 April 1945
- Preceded by: Fulvio Balisti
- Succeeded by: Office abolished

Personal details
- Born: 26 January 1901 Como, Kingdom of Italy
- Died: 28 April 1945 (aged 44) Dongo, Italy
- Party: National Fascist Party; Republican Fascist Party

Military service
- Allegiance: Italian Social Republic
- Branch/service: MVSN; Black Brigades
- Unit: 11th Black Brigade "Cesare Rodini"
- Battles/wars: World War II; Italian Civil War

Paolo Porta (26 January 1901 – 28 April 1945) was an Italian Fascist politician and soldier.

== Biography ==
Born in Como in 1901, he graduated in law at the Royal University of Pavia. He worked as a lawyer and joined the National Fascist Party in the 1920s. After the Armistice of Cassibile in September 1943, he joined the Italian Social Republic and on 14 September 1943, he reopened the headquarters of the Fascist Party in Como, becoming local federal secretary of the new Republican Fascist Party (PFR) and immediately enlisting in the reconstituted 16th Blackshirt Legion "Alpina". Porta was in fact a proponent of a complete merger between the PFR and the MVSN (which was to absorb all police forces) in order to constitute a politicized army, opposing the creation of an apolitical army for the Italian Social Republic. This idea materialized with the establishment of the Black Brigades; Porta himself became Commander of the 11th Black Brigade "Cesare Rodini", based in Como, which fought the Resistance and committed war crimes against captured partisans.

Porta participated in the Congress of Verona on November 14, 1943, and was one of the signatories of the programmatic manifesto of the RSI; during the Congress he attacked the Catholic Church for its "defeatist" influence (especially Ambrosian priests, whom he accused of encouraging young men to dodge the draft of the Italian Social Republic and escape to Switzerland). In March 1944, he replaced Fulvio Balisti as regional delegate for Lombardy of the Republican Fascist Party, also becoming Inspector of the Fasces of Lombardy. As the war neared its end, Porta was one of the supporters of the creation of the Valtellina Redoubt, where a small army made up of Fascist loyalists would fight the Allies to the last man. On 19 April 1945, he was summoned to Milan by Benito Mussolini, along with other senior PFR leaders, in order to discuss the possibility of negotiating with the National Liberation Committee. On 26 April, Porta joined in Como the Fascist column, coming from Milan, which included Mussolini and several Fascist leaders and ministers of the Italian Social Republic; it was Porta who suggested that the column head for Menaggio. On the following day, the column was stopped by the partisans near Musso, and all its members were captured; Porta was briefly held in Germasino together with Mussolini. On 28 April 1945, Porta and other Fascist leaders were executed by the partisans in Dongo; his body was taken to Piazzale Loreto in Milan, but was not among those put on display.
