= Walter Audisio =

Italian partisan and politician (1909–1973)

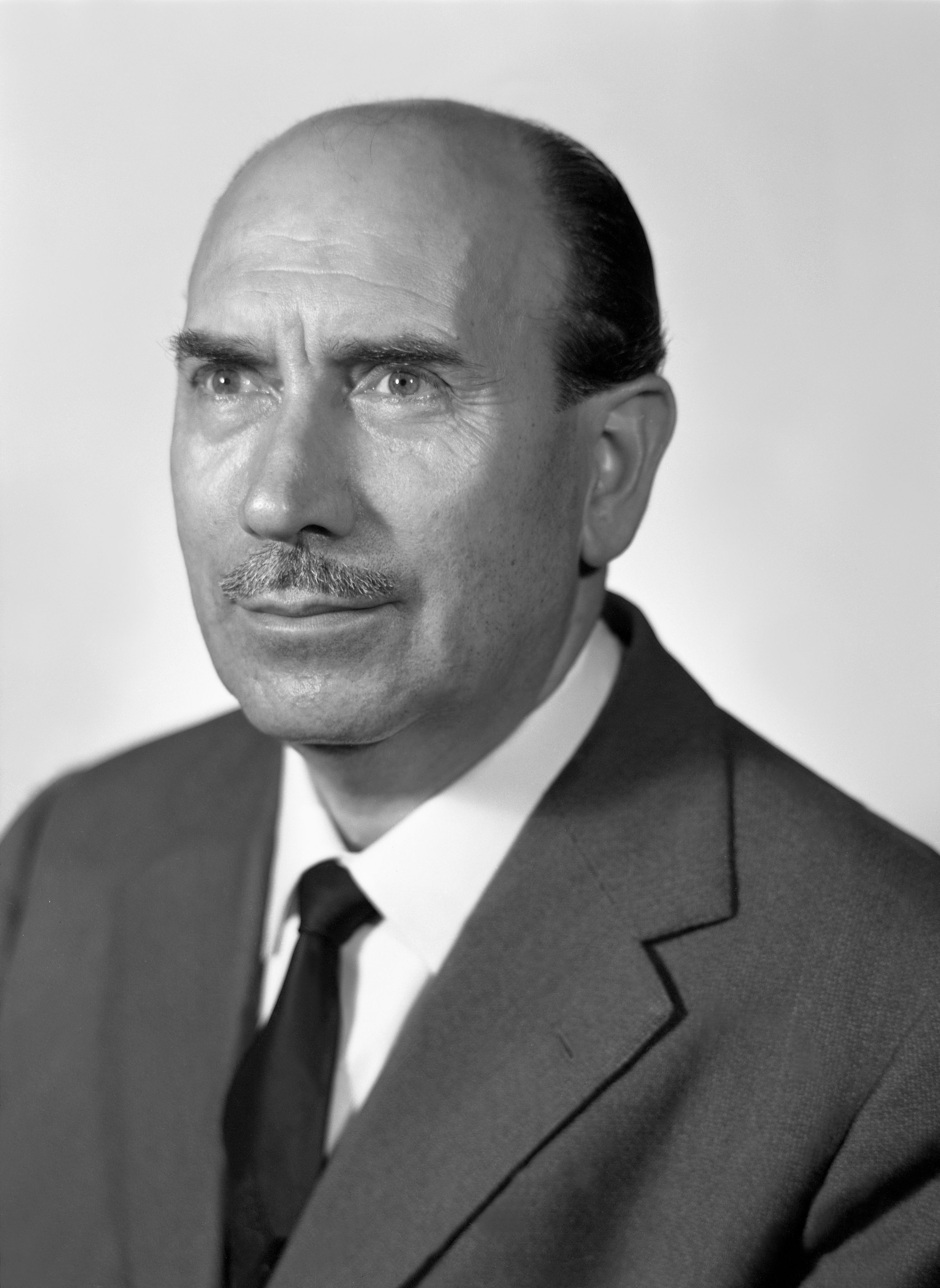
- Official Senate portrait, 1963

Member of the Senate of the Republic
- In office 16 May 1963 – 4 June 1968
- Constituency: Piedmont

Member of the Chamber of Deputies
- In office 8 May 1948 – 15 May 1963
- Constituency: Cuneo

Personal details
- Born: 28 June 1909 Alessandria, Piedmont, Kingdom of Italy
- Died: 11 October 1973 (aged 64) Rome, Lazio, Italy
- Resting place: Campo Verano, Rome
- Party: PCI
- Occupation: Accountant
- Nickname: Colonnello Valerio

Military service
- Allegiance: National Liberation Committee
- Service years: 1943–1945
- Rank: Lieutenant colonel
- Unit: Garibaldi Brigades
- Conflict: Italian Civil War

Walter Audisio (Italian pronunciation: [ˈvalter auˈdiːzjo]; 28 June 1909 – 11 October 1973), also known by his nom-de-guerre Colonel Valerio, was an Italian partisan and communist politician. A member of the Italian resistance movement during World War II, Audisio was involved in the death of Benito Mussolini, and personally executed the dictator and his mistress Clara Petacci according to the generally accepted account of the event.

== Biography ==
=== Early activities ===
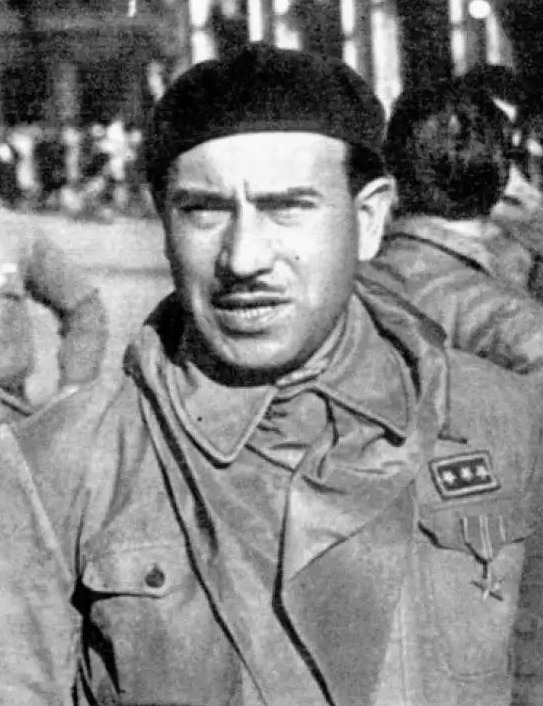
Audisio in 1945

Walter Audisio was born in Alessandria, in the north-western Piedmont region of Italy, in a family of modest economic conditions. He rose to the top of his class in school and found his first employment in a factory making Borsalino hats before working as an accountant. After his military service he got close to the underground anti-fascist movement and joined the illegal Communist Party of Italy in 1931. In 1932 he married Ernestina Ceriana, the daughter of another Communist militant. In May 1934 the group he was part of, which mostly distributed propaganda, was discovered by the police and Audisio was arrested. He was sentenced to five years of internal exile on the island of Ponza, where he managed to keep contacts with other Communist exiles and to deepen his studies on political and military topics. In 1935 he spent ten months in prison at Poggioreale for having taken part in a public protest while in Ponza. In May 1939 he was hospitalized for pleurisy; the poor health conditions of his wife convinced him to publicly renounce his "subversive principles" and ask for his punishment to be commuted. However, by 1942 he had resumed underground activity with the Communist Party.

In the days following the armistice of Cassibile, in September 1943, he took part in an attempt to organize anti-German resistance, and went into hiding after its failure. After spending some weeks in Casale Monferrato, where he helped organize partisan groups, he reached Turin and made contact with the National Liberation Committee (CLN) and the Piedmontese leadership of the Communist Party. In January 1944 he was sent to Vigevano, Lombardy, to set up the local GAP, underground urban guerrilla groups. From May to August 1944 he was inspector of the Garibaldi Brigades for the Varese and Bergamo area. He was then given the military command for the Mantua area and parts of the Po Valley, where he was in charge of about one thousand partisans and liaisoned directed with the general command of Resistance units, the Corpo Volontari della Libertà (CVL). During this time he started using the pseudonym "Colonel Valerio".

In December 1944, Giorgio Amendola, who had been exiled on Ponza with him, introduced him to Luigi Longo, vice-commander of the CVL. After this Audisio took part in the organization of the general insurrection of April 1945.

=== Killing of Mussolini ===
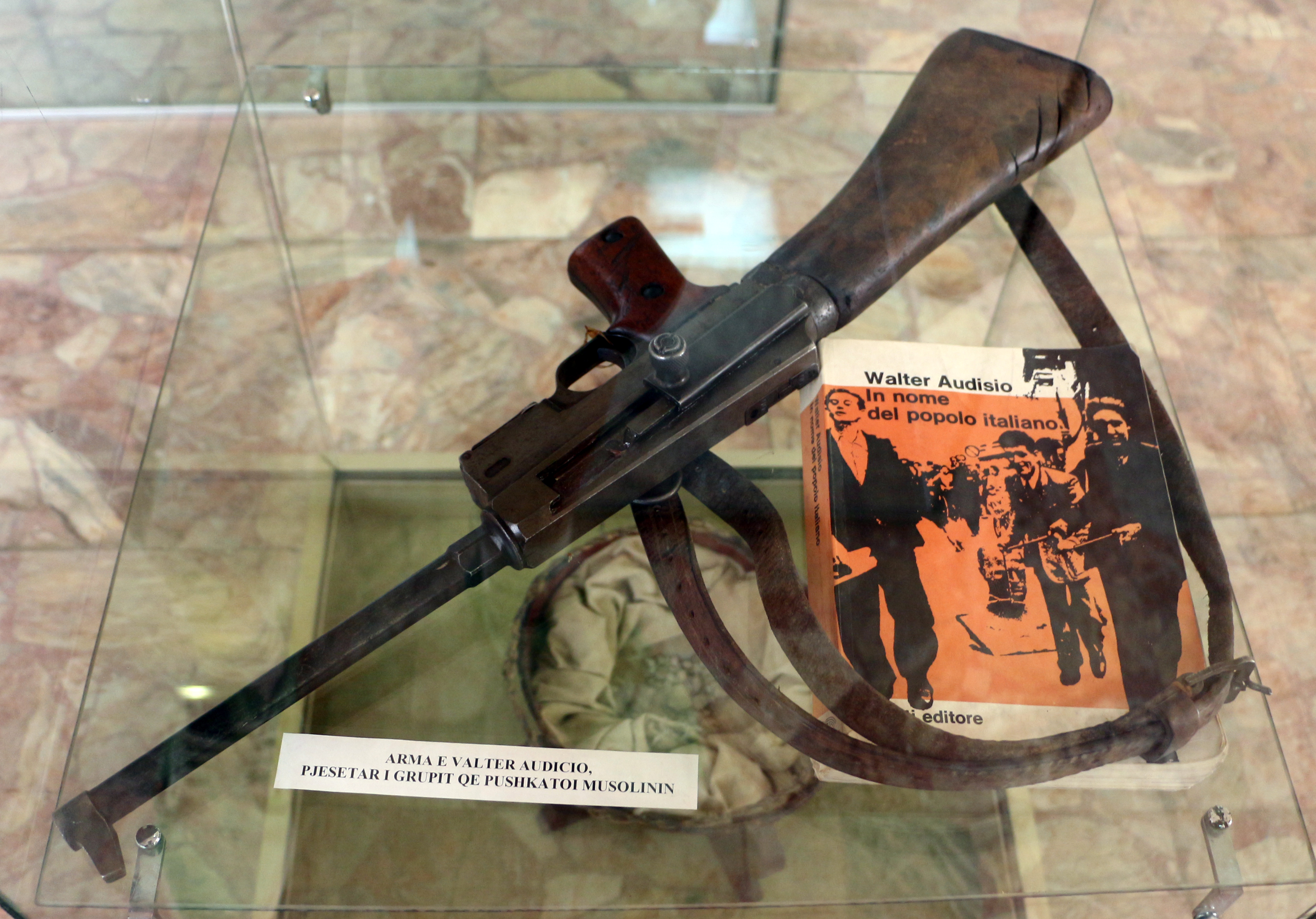
The MAS-38 submachine gun used by Audisio to execute Mussolini. It belonged to political commissar Michele Moretti, who lent it to Audisio after the latter's weapon jammed.

On 27 April 1945 the high command of the CVL entrusted him with the execution of Benito Mussolini, who had been arrested on that day by Communist partisans near Dongo. He carried out the execution of Mussolini, his mistress, and a number of high-ranking Fascists the following day in Giulino di Mezzegra, along with fellow partisan officers Aldo Lampredi and Michele Moretti. Audisio always claimed to have been the one who shot the dictator, something supported by a private report written by Lampredi as well.

Some sources have questioned this version, alleging instead that the execution was carried out by Lampredi, Moretti or other partisans who were with him, by British SOE officers, by Luigi Longo, or that Mussolini and Petacci committed suicide with cyanide capsules.

In the following years, Audisio would also be the target of various disputes over secret papers or valuables that Mussolini had allegedly been carrying at the time of its arrest, the death of Petacci, and the public exhibition of the corpses in Piazzale Loreto. His personal account of the events was published in the party newspaper l'Unità between 18 November and 15 December 1945 (under his pseudonym), and then again in March 1947, and in his memoirs In nome del popolo italiano, published posthumously in 1975.

=== Post-war career ===
After the war Audisio continued working with the communist movement. His identity as "Colonel Valerio" was revealed in March 1947 by the conservative newspaper Il Tempo, and then subsequently confirmed by the Communist Party. In 1948 he was elected to the Italian Chamber of Deputies for Alessandria with the Italian Communist Party, as part of the Popular Democratic Front, an alliance with the Socialist Party and smaller left-wing groups. He was re-elected in 1953 and 1958, and to the Senate in 1963. At the end of his Senate term he quit politics to work for the Italian oil company Eni.

Audisio was active as a member of the National Association of Italian Partisans (ANPI) and the National Association of Antifascist Italian Victims of Political Persecution (ANPPIA). He died of a heart attack in 1973, aged 64.

== In fiction ==
Audisio is played by Franco Nero in the 1974 movie Last Days of Mussolini.

== Electoral history ==
Election	House	Constituency	Party	Votes	Result
1948	Chamber of Deputies	Cuneo–Alessandria–Asti	PCI	67,654	Elected
1953	Chamber of Deputies	Cuneo–Alessandria–Asti	PCI	36,371	Elected
1958	Chamber of Deputies	Cuneo–Alessandria–Asti	PCI	20,082	Elected
1963	Senate of the Republic	Piedmont – Novi Ligure	PCI	31,872	Elected
