= Bonzanigo =

- Comune
- Comune di Bonzanigo
- Location within Italy Location within Lombardy
- Coordinates: 45°58′N 09°12′E
- Country: Italy
- Region: Lombardy
- Province: Como (CO)

Area
  - Total: 13 km^{2} (5.0 sq mi)

Population (2005)
  - Total: 50
  - Density: 3.8/km^{2} (10/sq mi)
- Time zone: UTC+1 (CET)
  - Summer (DST): UTC+2 (CEST)

Bonzanigo is a hamlet in the municipality of Tremezzina, in the province of Como, which went down in history as the place where Benito Mussolini and his lover Claretta Petacci were hosted on 28 April 1945, before being executed in Giulino.

== Bibliography ==
- Pierluigi Baima Bollone : "Le ultime ore di Mussolini" - Mondadori, Milano, 2005.
- Franco Bandini : "Le ultime 95 ore di Mussolini" - Sugar, Milano, 1959.
- Giorgio Pisanò : "Gli ultimi cinque secondi di Mussolini" - Il Saggiatore, Milano, 1996.
