= Francesco Maria Barracu =

Italian politician (1895–1945)

Undersecretary to the Presidency of the Council of Ministers of the Italian Social Republic
- In office 23 September 1943 – 25 April 1945
- Preceded by: office created
- Succeeded by: office abolished

Personal details
- Born: 1 November 1895 Santu Lussurgiu, Kingdom of Italy
- Died: 28 April 1945 (aged 49) Dongo, Italy
- Party: National Fascist Party; Republican Fascist Party

Military service
- Allegiance: Kingdom of Italy; Italian Social Republic
- Rank: Colonel
- Battles/wars: World War I (POW); Second Italo-Ethiopian War (WIA)
- Awards: Gold Medal of Military Valor; War Merit Cross

Francesco Maria Barracu (1 November 1895 – 28 April 1945) was an Italian Fascist politician and soldier who was the Undersecretary to the Presidency of the Council of Ministers of the Italian Social Republic from 1943 to his execution in 1945.

== Biography ==
Born in Sardinia, at age eighteen he enlisted in the Royal Italian Army, and during World War I was taken prisoner by the Austrians. After a prisoner exchange, he served in Libya. He was discharged on August 31, 1921 and joined the National Fascist Party where he obtained various positions within the PNF, including that of President of the Fasces of Sardinia. He fought with the rank of colonel in the Second Italo-Ethiopian War, as commander of the 3rd Dubat Battalion, distinguishing himself in the battle of the Ogaden, where he was seriously wounded. He lost an eye following injuries sustained in a clash against Ethiopian guerrillas in Uara Combo near Goba on March 3, 1937; for having refused to leave his post to receive medical assistance in spite of his injury, and for his previous role in the battle of Ogaden, he was awarded a Gold Medal of Military Valor.

After being repatriated, he devoted himself to journalism, especially writing on colonial issues. In 1941-1942 he was Federal Secretary of the Fascist Party in Benghazi, and later in Catanzaro. After the Armistice of Cassibile, he followed Benito Mussolini and participated in the foundation of the Italian Social Republic, helping to convince Marshal Rodolfo Graziani to assume the post of the Minister of National Defense.

He was appointed undersecretary to the Presidency of the Council of Ministers of the Italian Social Republic, and had a notable role in the transfer to northern Italy of the officials of the ministries and in the organization of the administration of the Fascist puppet state. He tried, without success, to annexate Sardinia to the Italian Social Republic, and later set up a legion of Sardinian soldiers known as the "Giovanni Maria Angioy" Volunteer Battalion, employed in the Julian March; some members of the battalion were parachuted in Sardinia to act as spies and saboteurs.

During the first meeting of the newborn Republican Fascist Party, Barracu harshly attacked secretary Alessandro Pavolini and minister of the Interior Guido Buffarini-Guidi, unsuccessfully begging the Duce to take their place; he was accused by Giovanni Preziosi of being a member of the Freemasonry. In the final months of the war he sided with the hardliners and asked that Milan not be abandoned, in an attempt to make it the "Alcazar of Fascism".

On 25 April 1945 Barracu participated in the meeting between Mussolini and the leaders of the National Liberation Committee hosted by the Archbishop of Milan, Alfredo Ildefonso Schuster. After the failure of the meeting, he followed Mussolini in his escape to Lake Como, but was captured along with other Fascist leaders in Dongo by the partisans, and executed by firing squad on 28 April 1945. Like the other Fascist leaders, he was shot in the back; before the execution he demanded "I am a gold medalist, I have the right to be shot in the chest", but was forced to turn. His body was among those put on display in Piazzale Loreto in Milan.

== Sources ==
- De Felice, Renzo (1964). "BARRACU, Francesco Maria". Dizionario Biografico degli Italiani (in Italian). Vol. 6: Baratteri–Bartolozzi. Rome: Istituto dell'Enciclopedia Italiana. OCLC 883370.
