= Urbano Lazzaro =

Italian resistance fighter (1924–2006)

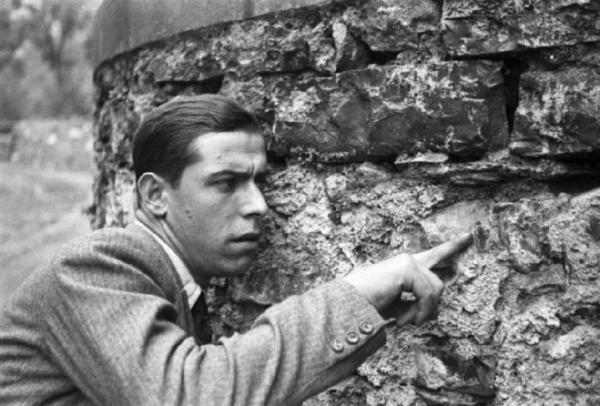
- Lazzaro at the Villa Belmonte, where Benito Mussolini was executed
- Born: 4 November 1924; Quinto Vicentino, Italy
- Died: 3 January 2006 (aged 81); Vercelli, Italy
- Occupation: Partisan

Urbano Lazzaro (4 November 1924 – 3 January 2006) was an Italian partisan who played a vital role in the capture of Benito Mussolini near the end of World War II.

Lazzaro was born in Quinto Vicentino in the Veneto region. As a young man, he joined the Italian Guardia di Finanza before the war. When Italy's alliance with Germany collapsed in 1943, Lazzaro was among many Italian officials arrested by the Germans.

Lazzaro escaped from German detention and joined the communist partisans in northern Italy. By April 27, 1945, he was serving as the political commissar of the 52nd Garibaldi Partisan Brigade. At Dongo, troops of the brigade had halted a convoy of German trucks trying to escape into Switzerland. A partisan became suspicious of an older "German" in a greatcoat, wearing glasses, and with his helmet pulled down over his head. Upon having the man brought to his attention, Lazzaro immediately recognized him as the former Duce.

Lazzaro was not present at Mussolini's subsequent execution. However, he investigated the execution after the war and came to believe that Mussolini was shot the same day he was arrested, in contrast to the officially accepted version of events. Lazzaro published a book on this topic titled Dongo: la Fine di Mussolini in 1962.

Lazzaro went on to become an executive of the Piedmont Hydroelectric Authority after the war. He later moved to Rio de Janeiro, Brazil where he and his wife had three children. During his wartime combat he was known as "Bill." He died in a hospital in Vercelli, Italy, in 2006, at age 81, having outlived almost all the other leading partisans.

== See also ==
- Dongo Treasure
