= MAS-38 =

French submachine gun

Pistolet Mitrailleur de 7,65mm MAS modèle 38
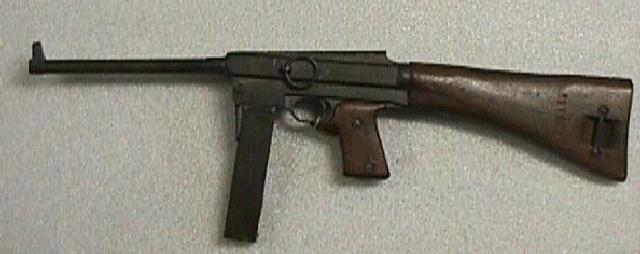
- Type: Submachine gun
- Place of origin: French Third Republic / Vichy France / Provisional Government of the French Republic / French Fourth Republic

Service history
- In service: 1938–present
- Used by: See Users
- Wars: World War II; First Indochina War; Algerian War; Laotian Civil War; Vietnam War

Production history
- Designed: 1938
- Produced: 1938—1949
- No. built: 1,958 (made before May 1940) thousands more made under German occupation and post war

Specifications
- Mass: 2.87 kg (6.3 lb) (empty)
- Length: 630 mm (25 in)
- Barrel length: 224 mm (8.82 in)
- Cartridge: 7.65mm Longue
- Caliber: 7.65mm
- Action: Off-axis bolt travel blowback
- Rate of fire: 600–700 rounds/min
- Muzzle velocity: 350 m/s (1,148 ft/s)
- Effective firing range: 100m
- Maximum firing range: 200m
- Feed system: 32-round detachable box magazine

The MAS-38 is a French submachine gun designed in the 1930s and used by French and German forces during the Second World War. It was derived from a small arms development program that took place between 1918 and 1922 under the control of the Service Technique de l'Armement. A submachine gun, a light machine gun and a semiautomatic rifle were developed to replace all the existing small arms. Budgetary pressures resulting from the building of the Maginot Line led to the delay of adoption of these new arms except for the LMG 1924.

== History ==
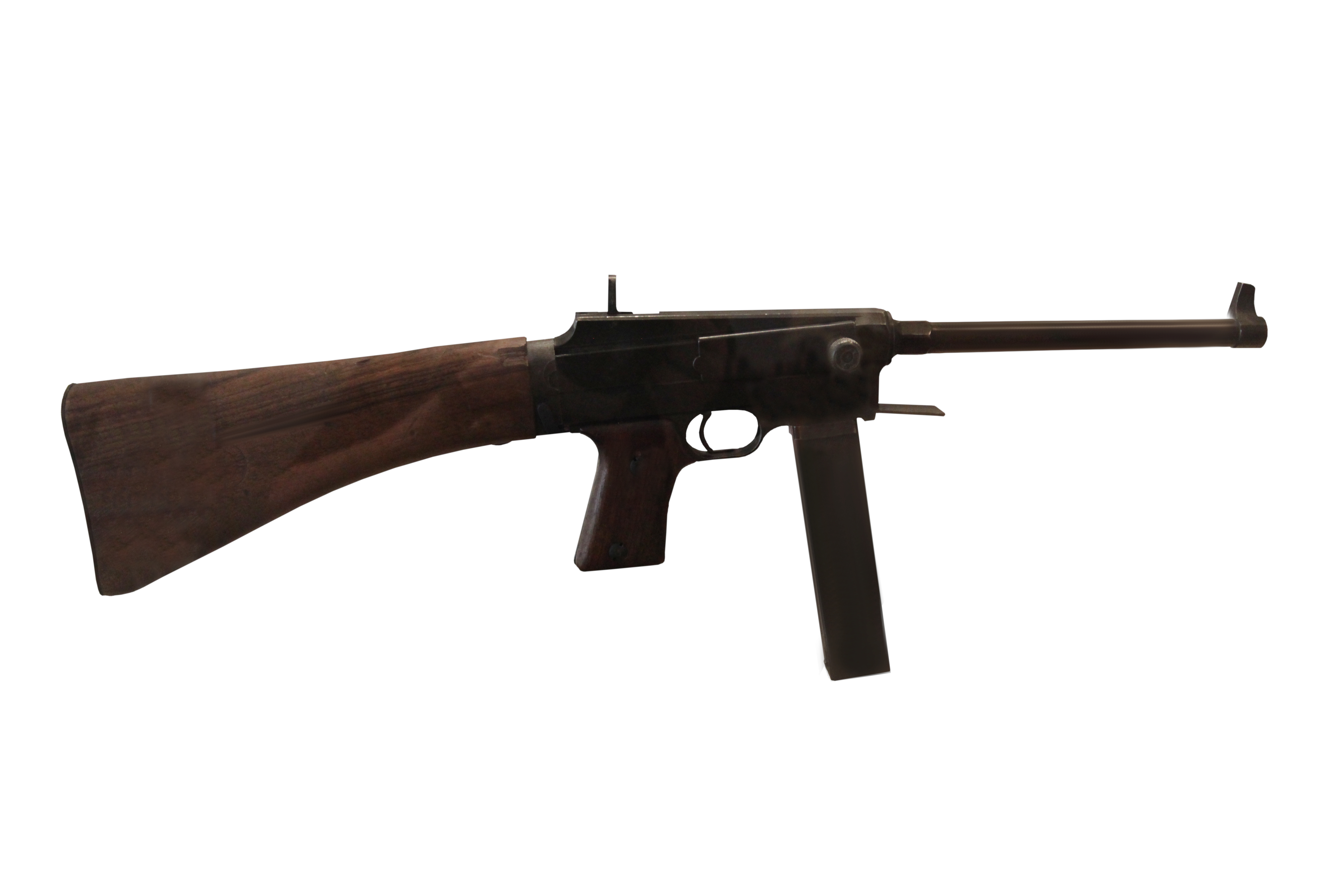
1935 prototype on display at the Musée de l'Armée.

The Pistolet Mitrailleur MAS modèle 38 (MAS Model 38 Submachine Gun) was developed from the experimental MAS-35, itself derived from the STA 1922 and the MAS 1924 both in 9 mm produced immediately after World War I. Prior to the development of this weapon France used a variety of German and Swiss submachine guns.

MAS, the Manufacture d'Armes de Saint-Étienne (Saint-Étienne Weapons Factory), was a French supplier of arms that manufactured several firearms for the French military, including the MAS-36 rifle, the MAS-49 rifle, and the FAMAS. It is now part of Nexter. The French Ministry of War said it had no need for a submachine gun and mass-production did not begin until 1939.

The German army seized the MAS plant in 1940 just as the MAS-38 was entering large-scale production. The Germans accepted the gun as a substitute standard weapon, naming it the 7.65 mm MP722(f). They continued production of the gun for their own armed forces and supplied some to the Vichy French.

On April 28, 1945, one was used by Italian partisans to execute the former Fascist leader Benito Mussolini.

Production ended in 1949. By that time 1,958 were manufactured before German occupation, and further production is unknown. The French police continued to use the MAS-38 after World War II until it was replaced in the 1950s by the MAT-49 submachine gun.

== Design details ==
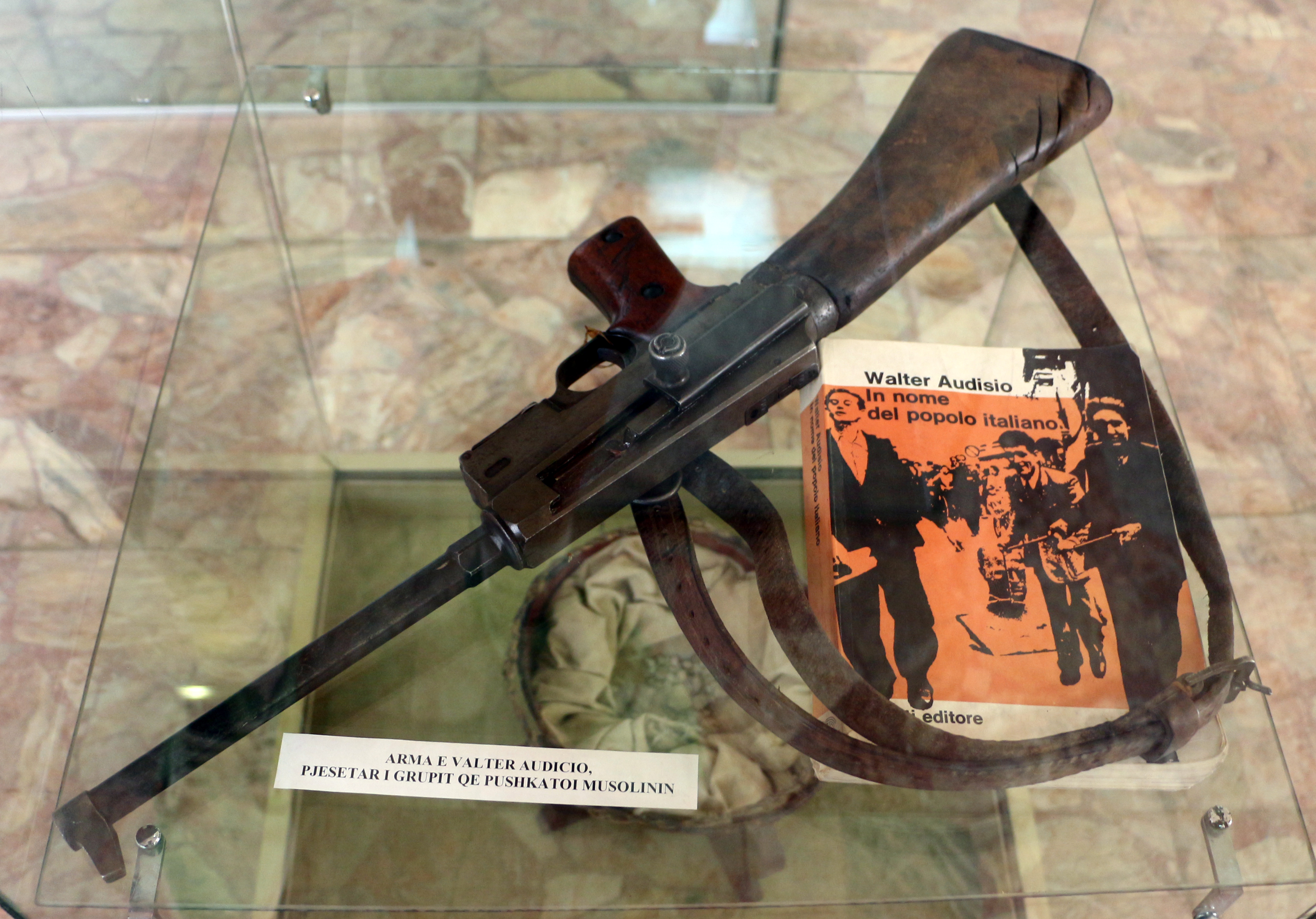
The MAS-38 used by Walter Audisio to execute Benito Mussolini (National Historical Museum of Albania)

The MAS-38 is 623mm (24.53 in) long with a 224 mm (8.82 in) barrel; it weighs 2.87 kg (6.33 lb) empty. It uses a 32-round box magazine. The muzzle velocity is 350 m/s (1,148 ft/s) and it has a rate of fire of 600 to 700 rounds per minute.

The MAS-38 was chambered for the 7.65mm Longue cartridge, which although similar to the .30 Pedersen cartridge is not an exact copy. The 7.65 French Longue cartridge is nearly identical to its predecessor used by the Pedersen device, but with slight differences in the groove of the shell. This was also the cartridge used for France's M1935 series of service pistols, allowing for limited standardization, but with the effect of preventing French soldiers from using captured enemy ammunition.

The MAS-38 is easily recognizable due to its unorthodox receiver layout. This is because the receiver and butt diverge in alignment from the axis of the barrel by several degrees, making the weapon compact as its bolt recoils inside a tube running through the buttstock, while also enabling a lighter bolt to be used by providing mechanical disadvantage to the pressure from the expanding propellant gases. To allow a natural aiming stance, the butt had to drop while the receiver had to remain in alignment. This required that the bolt approach the breech at an angle and the face of the bolt was cut obliquely to allow it to close evenly on the cartridge. The MAS-38 also features an unusual safety catch: the bolt was locked (in either the forward or rear position) by pushing the trigger forward. A valuable feature was that tools were not required for its disassembly.

A very high quality weapon, the MAS-38 was machined from solid steel with only a few stamped parts. It was designed with a buffered sear assembly to prevent wear and increase the life of the internal parts. A dual range sight system was concealed within the receiver so as to be out of sight until it was flipped up for use.

The odd appearance of the MAS-38 did not detract from its accuracy, but its cartridge was underpowered compared to the German 9mm standard pistol ammunition.

== Users ==
- Burkina Faso
- Central African Republic Central African Republic Police had 30 MAS-38s in 1963.
- France: French armed forces.
  - (Free France) : French Resistance and Free French Forces.
  - Vichy France
- Germany: Known as the Maschinenpistole 722(f) in German service.
- Poland
- Senegal
- Vietnam
  - (North Vietnam) : Viet Minh.
  - South Vietnam
- Laos: Lao Issara and Pathet Lao.
