= Pier Luigi Bellini delle Stelle =

Italian anti-fascist partisan and lawyer (1920–1984)

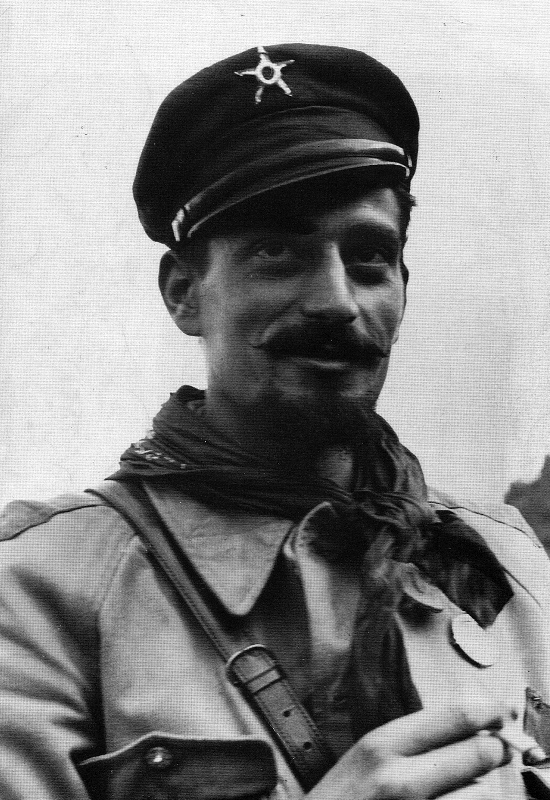
- Pier Luigi Bellini delle Stelle, Italian partisan
- Born: May 14, 1920; Florence, Italy
- Died: January 25, 1984 (aged 63); San Donato Milanese, Italy
- Occupation: Military commander · Lawyer

Notes
- Source A.N.P.I.

Pier Luigi Bellini delle Stelle (14 May 1920 – 25 January 1984) was an Italian anti-fascist communist partisan and practicing lawyer, notable for capturing Benito Mussolini at Dongo in April 1945, where he used the nom de guerre of Pedro.

He was born into an aristocratic family in Florence and was schooled in Pistoia. After the war, he worked in the Metanopoli neighbourhood of San Donato Milanese and later became an official of Snam.

== Works ==
- (with Urbano Lazzaro) Dongo: la fine di Mussolini. Translated by W. H. Darwell as Dongo: The Last Act. London, MacDonald & Co, 1964.
