= Piazzale Loreto =

City square in Milan, Italy

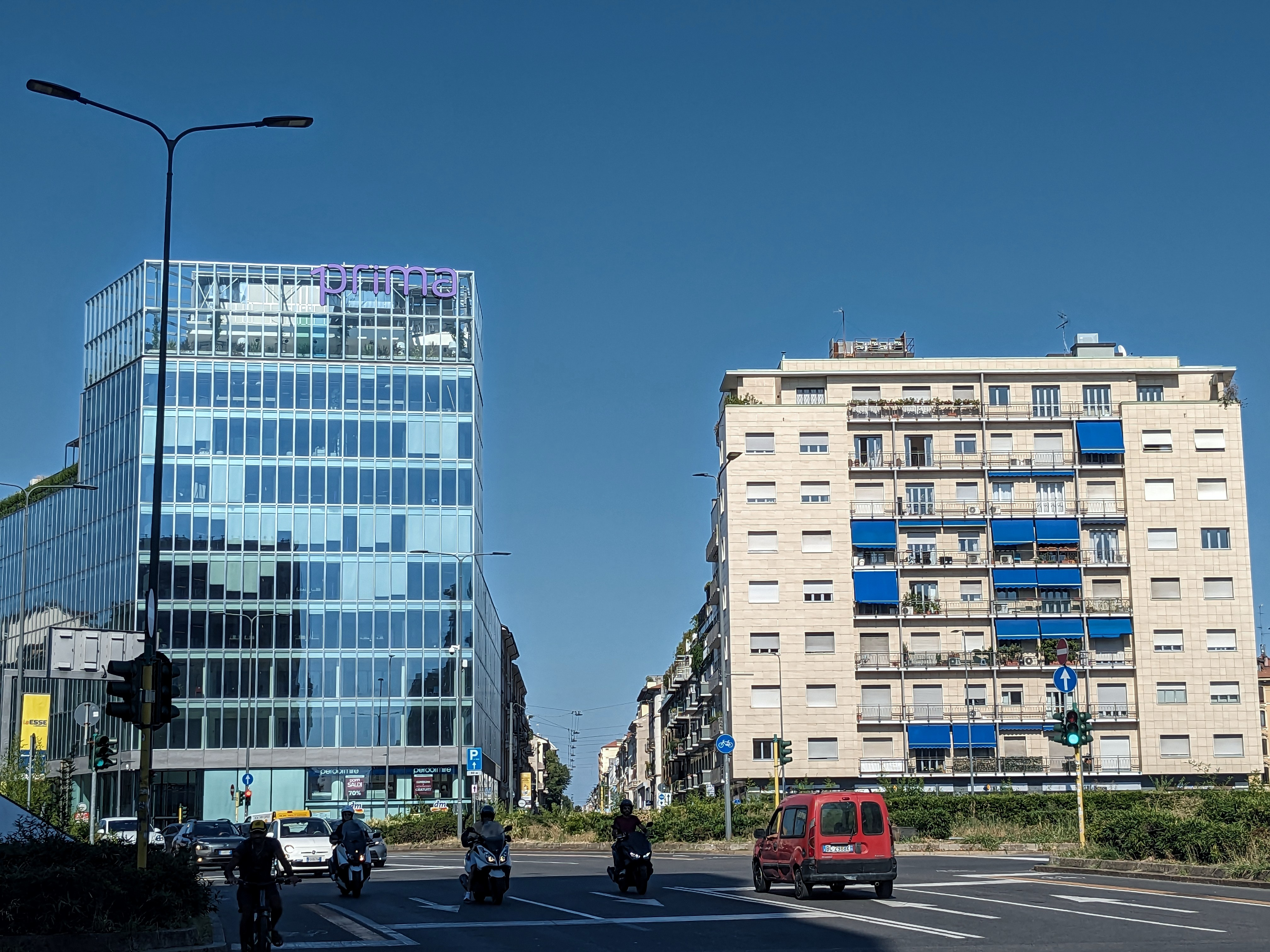
- Interactive map of Piazzale Loreto
- Former name: Piazza Quindici Martiri
- Namesake: Our Lady of Loreto
- Location: Milan, Italy
- Coordinates: 45.48645°N 9.21615°E

Other
- Known for: Mussolini's corpse on 29 April 1945

Piazzale Loreto is a major city square in Milan, Italy.

== Origin ==
The name Loreto is also used in a wider sense to refer to the district surrounding the square, which is part of the Zone 2 administrative division, in the northeastern part of the city. The name "Loreto" derives from an old sanctuary that used to be there and that was dedicated to Our Lady of Loreto in the province of Ancona.

== Transportation ==
The Milan Metro Loreto station on line 1 is located partially underneath the square; it is an important transfer station with line 2. The tracks and platforms of this latter line are located, however, underneath nearby Piazza Argentina.

== History ==
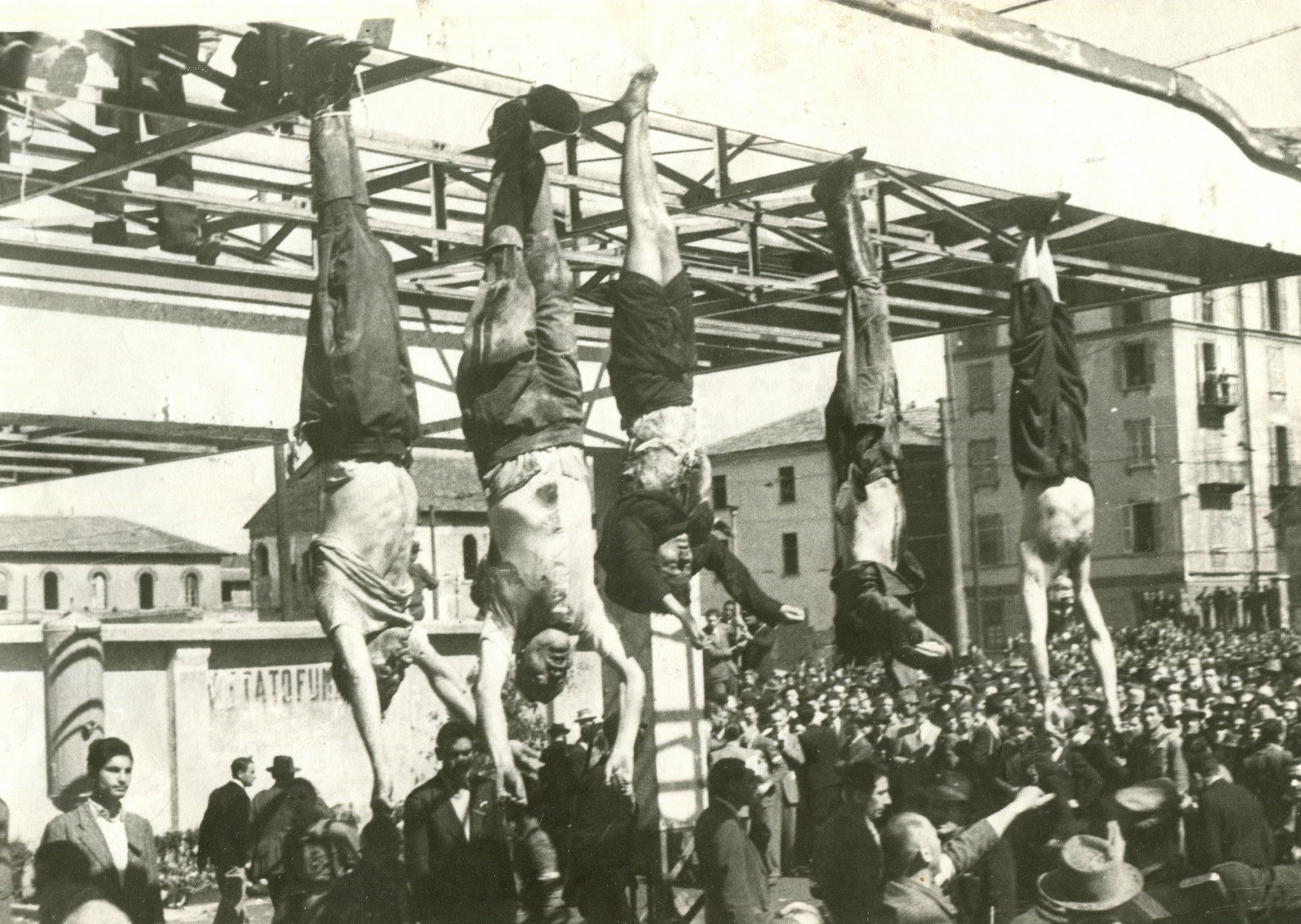
From left to right, the dead bodies of Bombacci, Mussolini, Petacci, Pavolini and Starace in Piazzale Loreto, 29 April 1945

The square, on 10 August 1944, was the scene of the public execution by the German occupation authorities of 15 Milanese civilians handpicked by Theo Saevecke, head of the Gestapo in Milan, as a reprisal for a partisan attack on a German military convoy. The executed were left on display for a number of days. The event became known as the "massacre of piazzale Loreto" and the executed as "martyrs of piazzale Loreto." In the aftermath of that event, Mussolini is said to have prophetically remarked "for the blood of Piazzale Loreto, we shall pay dearly". The square, for a time, was renamed Piazza Quindici Martiri in honour of the executed.

Piazzale Loreto was later the scene of the public display of Benito Mussolini's corpse on 29 April 1945. The day before, Mussolini, his mistress Clara Petacci and some other high-ranking Fascists had been captured and shot by partisans in Giulino, near Lake Como. Their bodies were taken to Milan and hung upside down from the roof of an Esso petrol station in the square, located between Corso Buenos Aires and Viale Andrea Doria.

On 29 April 1945, fascist party gerarca Achille Starace, who had been living in Milan, was recognized and arrested by government forces. He was turned over to the partisans who tried him and sentenced him to death. He was taken to the square and shown the body of Mussolini, which he saluted before being executed himself. Starace's body was subsequently strung up next to Mussolini's. The bodies were photographed as the crowd vented their rage upon them. The display of the bodies took place in the same spot where they had displayed the fifteen Milanese civilians whom they had killed in retaliation against partisan activity.

After the war, the design of the square was changed to accommodate increasing road traffic in the city.

== See also ==
- Death of Benito Mussolini
