= Musso, Lombardy =

Musso Muss (Lombard)
- Comune
- Comune di Musso
- Coat of arms

- Location within Italy Location within Lombardy
- Coordinates: 46°6′44″N 9°16′33″E
- Country: Italy
- Region: Lombardy
- Province: Como (CO)
- Frazioni: Bresciana, Campagnano, Campaccio, Croda, Genico, Terza

Government
  - Mayor: Ugo Bertera

Area
  - Total: 4.12 km^{2} (1.59 sq mi)
- Elevation: 201 m (659 ft)

Population (31 December 2007)
  - Total: 1,060
  - Density: 257/km^{2} (666/sq mi)
- Demonym: Mussesi
- Time zone: UTC+1 (CET)
  - Summer (DST): UTC+2 (CEST)
- Postal code: 22010
- Dialing code: 0344
- Patron saint: Saint Biaggio
- Saint day: 3 February

Musso (Comasco: Muss [ˈmys]) is a small town in the Province of Como in the Italian region Lombardy. It lies on the western shore of the northern branch of Lake Como about 35 kilometres (22 mi) northeast of the city of Como. The comune of Musso, which includes the town itself and the surrounding area of lake and mountainside, extends over an area of 412 hectares (1,020 acres), with a minimum elevation of 199 metres (653 ft) and a maximum of 1,325 metres (4,347 ft) and has a population of 1,020. It borders the communes of Dongo to the north, Pianello del Lario to the south and Colico across the lake in the Province of Lecco.

The commune is a member of the Comunità Montana Alto Lario Occidentale.

== Main sights ==
The castle, which dates back to the fourteenth century, was the power-base of Gian Giacomo Medici (‘il Medeghino’), brother of Pope Pius IV, and variously known as “pirate, king, brigand, traitor, rebel, assassin and hero”. During the years 1522 to 1532 he acquired control over much of the lake and parts of Brianza. He was finally defeated by the combined forces of the Duke of Milan Francesco II Sforza, the Swiss Confederacy and the Grisons.
