= Giulino =

- Frazione
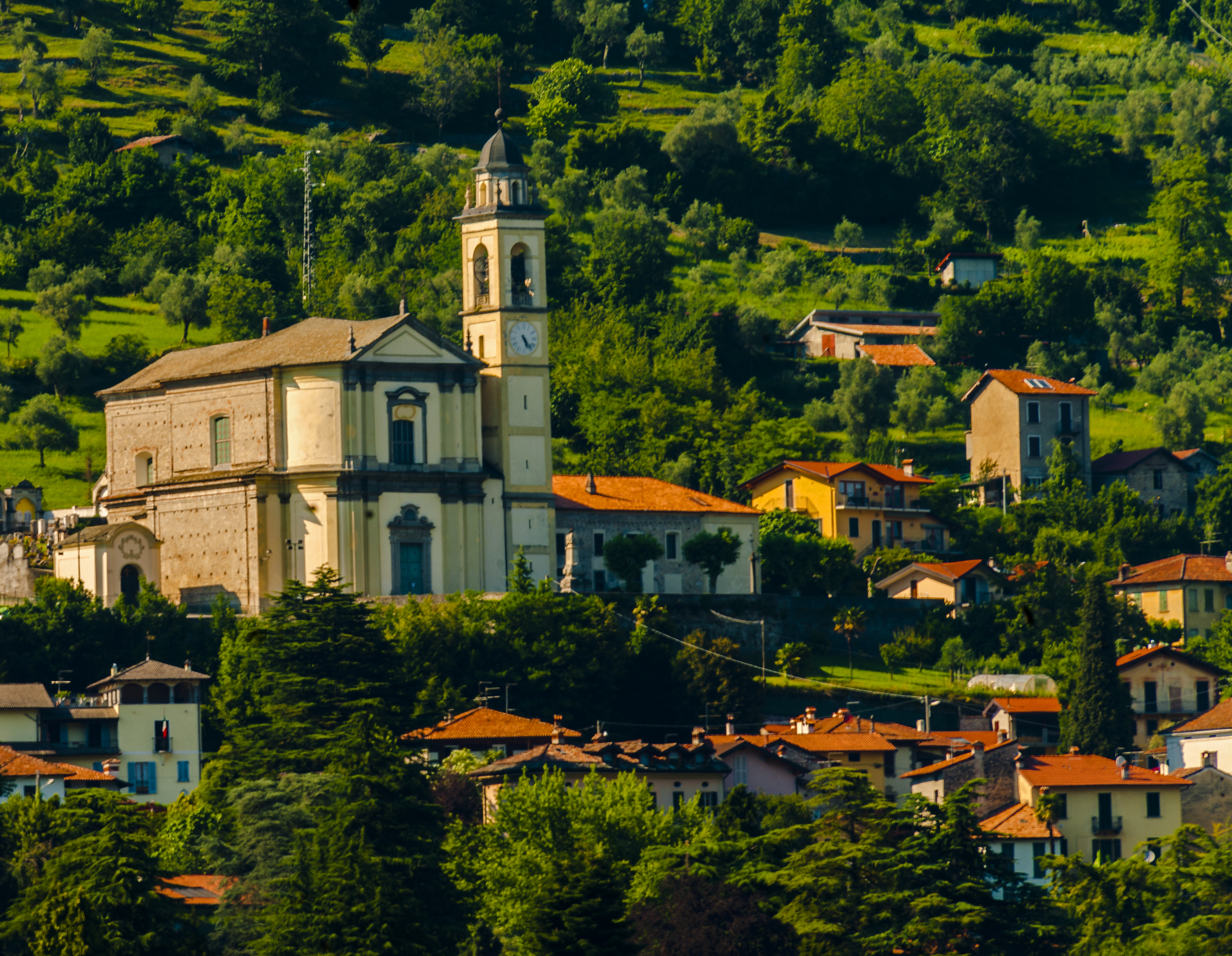
- View from the lake

- Location of Giulino in Italy
- Coordinates: 45°58′57″N 09°12′22″E
- Country: Italy
- Region: Lombardy
- Province: Como (CO)
- Comune: Tremezzina
- Elevation: 250 m (820 ft)

Population (2005)
  - Total: 50
- Demonym: Giulinesi
- Time zone: UTC+1 (CET)
  - Summer (DST): UTC+2 (CEST)
- Postal code: 22010
- Dialing code: 0344

Giulino (also known as Giulino di Mezzegra) is an Italian frazione of the Comune of Mezzegra, in the province of Como. Since 21 January 2014, both Giulino and Mezzegra are included in the comune of Tremezzina.

== History ==
=== Early history ===
The village was an autonomous municipality until 1928, when it merged into Mezzegra becoming its frazione (civil parish).

=== Death of Mussolini ===
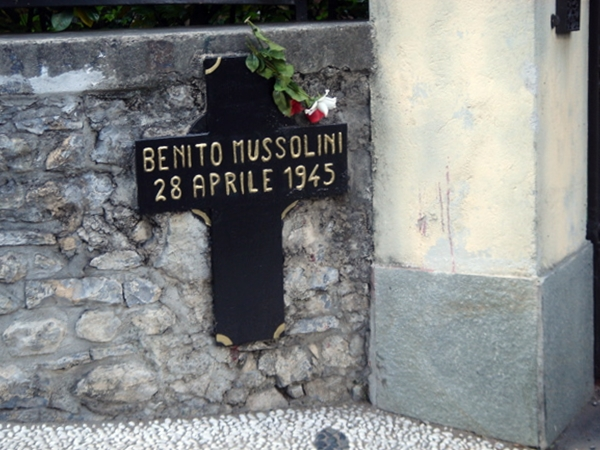
Memorial cross at Mussolini's death place

The village is the place where Benito Mussolini and his lover Claretta Petacci were executed on 28 April 1945, in front of a manor house named Villa Belmonte. The execution was carried out on the orders of the National Liberation Committee by Walter Audisio, a Communist partisan, after Mussolini was captured in Dongo (often erroneously considered to be the place where the execution took place).

== Geography ==
Giulino, part of the Intelvi geographical region, lies on the hills close to the north-western shore of the Lake Como. It is 2 km from Mezzegra, 30 from Como and 40 from Lugano (in Switzerland).

== Literature ==
- Bruno Giovanni Lonati : "Quel 28 aprile. Mussolini e Claretta: la verità". Mursia, 1994. ISBN 88-425-1761-5
