= Armorial of Italy =

This article presents the coats of arms of Italy.

== National ==
1948–Present

=== Historical ===
Kingdom of Italy (Napoleonic) 1805–1814

Kingdom of Italy 1861–1890

1890–1927 and 1943–1946

1927-1929

1929–1943

Italian Social Republic 1943–1945

=== Emilia-Romagna ===
Duchy of Mirandola 1310–1711

County of Novellara and Bagnolo 1371–1728

Duchy of Mantua 1406–1621

Duchy of Ferrara 1450–1597

Duchy of Modena and Reggio 1452–1796 and 1814–1859

Duchy of Parma 1545–1802/1808 and 1814–1859

Taro (department) 1808–1814

Republic of Rose Island 1968

=== Friuli-Venezia Giulia ===
County of Gorizia 1127–1747

Kingdom of Illyria 1816–1849

Free Territory of Trieste 1947–1954

=== Campania ===
Coat of arms of the Kings of Naples 1442–1501

Coat of arms of Ferdinand II of Aragon as King of Naples 1504–1516

Coat of arms of Joanna of Castile as Queen of Naples 1504–1516

Coat of arms of Charles V as King of Naples 1516-1554

Kingdom of the Two Sicilies 1816–1861

=== Lazio ===
Papal States 756–1870

Duchy of Castro 1537–1649

Principality of Pontecorvo 1806–1815

=== Liguria ===
Marquisate of Finale 967–1602

Republic of Genoa XIth century – 1797

Republic of Noli 1192–1797

Ligurian Republic 1797–1805

=== Lombardia ===
Duchy of Milan 1395–1447 and 1450–1796

Margraviate of Mantua 1433–1530

Duchy of Mantua 1530–1708

Cisalpine Republic 1797–1802

Italian Republic (Napoleonic) 1802–1805

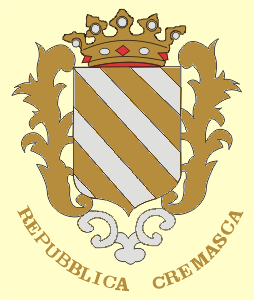
Republic of Crema 1796–1797

=== Marche ===
Republic of Ancona XIth century – 1532

Duchy of Urbino 1213–1631

=== Piedmont ===
March of Montferrat 961–1574

Marquisate of Saluzzo 1125–1548

=== Sardinia ===
Judicate of Arborea IXth – 1420

Judicate of Cagliari 1020–1258

Judicate of Gallura Xthk – 1296

Judicate of Logudoro Xth – 1259

Kingdom of Sardinia 1297–1743-1861

Kingdom of Tavolara 1836–1886

=== Sicily ===
Kingdom of Sicily 1130–1816

=== Tuscany ===
Republic of Pisa XI-th – 1406

Republic of Florence 1115–1537

Republic of Siena 1125–1555

Republic of Lucca 1160–1805

County of Santa Fiora 1274–1806

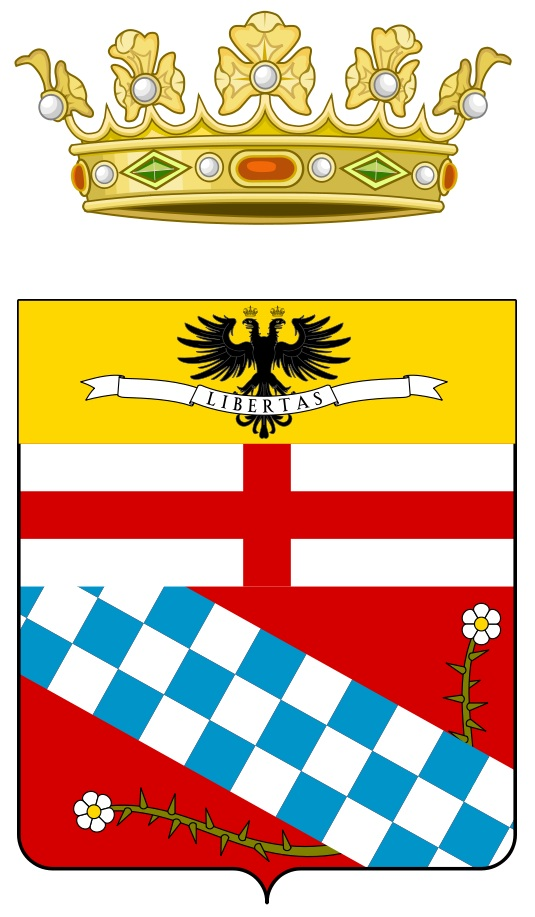
Duchy of Massa and Carrara 1473–1829

Grand Duchy of Tuscany 1532–1737

Grand Duchy of Tuscany 1737–1859

Kingdom of Etruria 1801–1807

Principality of Lucca and Piombino 1805–1814

Principality of Elba 1814–1815

Duchy of Lucca 1815–1847

=== Trentino-Alto Adige/Südtirol ===
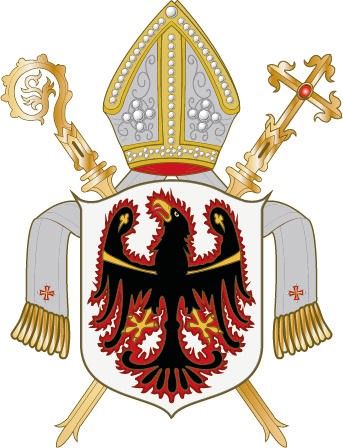
Prince-Bishopric of Trent 1027–1803

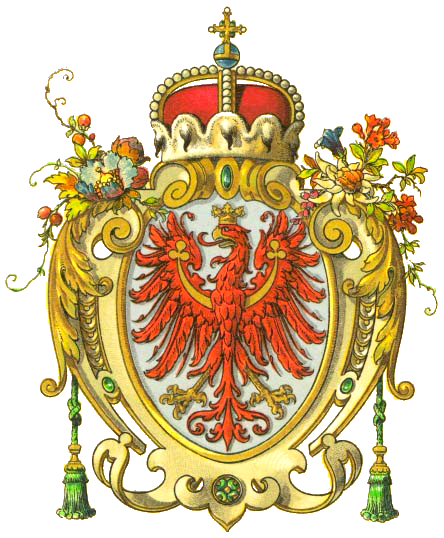
County of Tyrol 1271-1919

=== Umbria ===
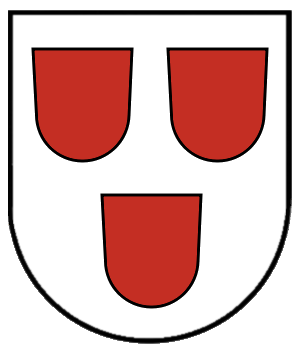
Duchy of Spoleto

Republic of Cospaia 1440–1826

=== Veneto ===
Republic of Venice 697–1797

Republic of Venice (alternate version)

Kingdom of Lombardy–Venetia 1815–1859/1866

=== President ===
Many of the Presidents of Italy have borne arms; either through inheritance, or via membership of foreign Orders of Chivalry, in particular, the Order of the Seraphim and the Order of the Elephant.

Arms	Name of President and Blazon
	Arms of Enrico De Nicola, President of Italy, 1948 Ancestral arms: Gules, a hound rampant argent neckbanded Or.
	Arms of Luigi Einaudi, President of Italy, 1948–1955 Argent upon on a cogwheel proper, a Mullet of five points Argent fimbriated Gules, within a wreath of laurel Vert on a ribbon Gules the words REPVBBLICA ITALIANA in capital letters Argent. No crest No motto
	Giovanni Gronchi, President of Italy, 1955–1962 No arms known
	Arms of Antonio Segni, President of Italy, 1962–1964 Ancestral arms: Or, a cross Azure. On a chief Or, an Eagle displayed Sable Crest: the coronet of an Italian Patrician proper As a Knight of the Papal Supreme Order of Christ, he bore the arms: Argent upon on a cogwheel proper, a Mullet of five points Argent fimbriated Gules, within a wreath of laurel Vert on a ribbon Gules the words "REPVBBLICA ITALIANA" in capital letters Argent. No crest No motto
	Arms of Giuseppe Saragat, President of Italy, 1964–1971 As a Knight of the Swedish Order of the Seraphim, President Saragat chose to use the emblem of the Italian Republic in place of a coat of arms.
	Giovanni Leone, President of Italy, 1971–1978 No arms known
	Arms of Sandro Pertini, President of Italy, 1978–1985 As a Knight of the Spanish Order of Charles III, President Pertini chose to use the emblem of the Italian Republic in place of a coat of arms.
	Arms of Francesco Cossiga, President of Italy, 1985–1992 Per pale Argent and Gules in Dexter from base an olive tree Gules fructed Sable and to the sinister issuant from base an Oak branch Argent fructed Or. In base point per pale Gules and Argent. Motto: Nisi domine custodierit civitatem frusta visila qui custodem eam (Latin: 'Unless the Lord guards the city, the watchmen guard it in vain').
	Arms of Oscar Luigi Scalfaro, President of Italy, 1992–1999 Ancestral arms: Party per fess Azure and Or, in honour point an arm armoured Or, holding a sword pommeled and bladed Argent in the base a book Argent, pages Gules, surrounded by sprig of Olive plant Vert, fructed Sable on a chief checky Argent and Gules.
	Carlo Azeglio Ciampi, President of Italy, 1999–2006 No arms known
	Giorgio Napolitano, President of Italy, 2006–2015 As a Knight of the Swedish Order of the Seraphim, President Napolitano chose to use the emblem of the Italian Republic in place of a coat of arms.
	Sergio Mattarella, President of Italy, 2015–present As a Knight of the Swedish Order of the Seraphim and Spanish Order of Isabella the Catholic, President Mattarella chose to use the emblem of the Italian Republic in place of a coat of arms.

== Regions ==
Abruzzo

Aosta Valley

Apulia

Basilicata

Calabria

Campania (details)

Emilia-Romagna

Sardinia

Friuli-Venezia Giulia

Lazio

Liguria

Lombardy

Marche

Molise

Piedmont

Sicily

Tuscany

Trentino-Alto Adige/Südtirol

Umbria

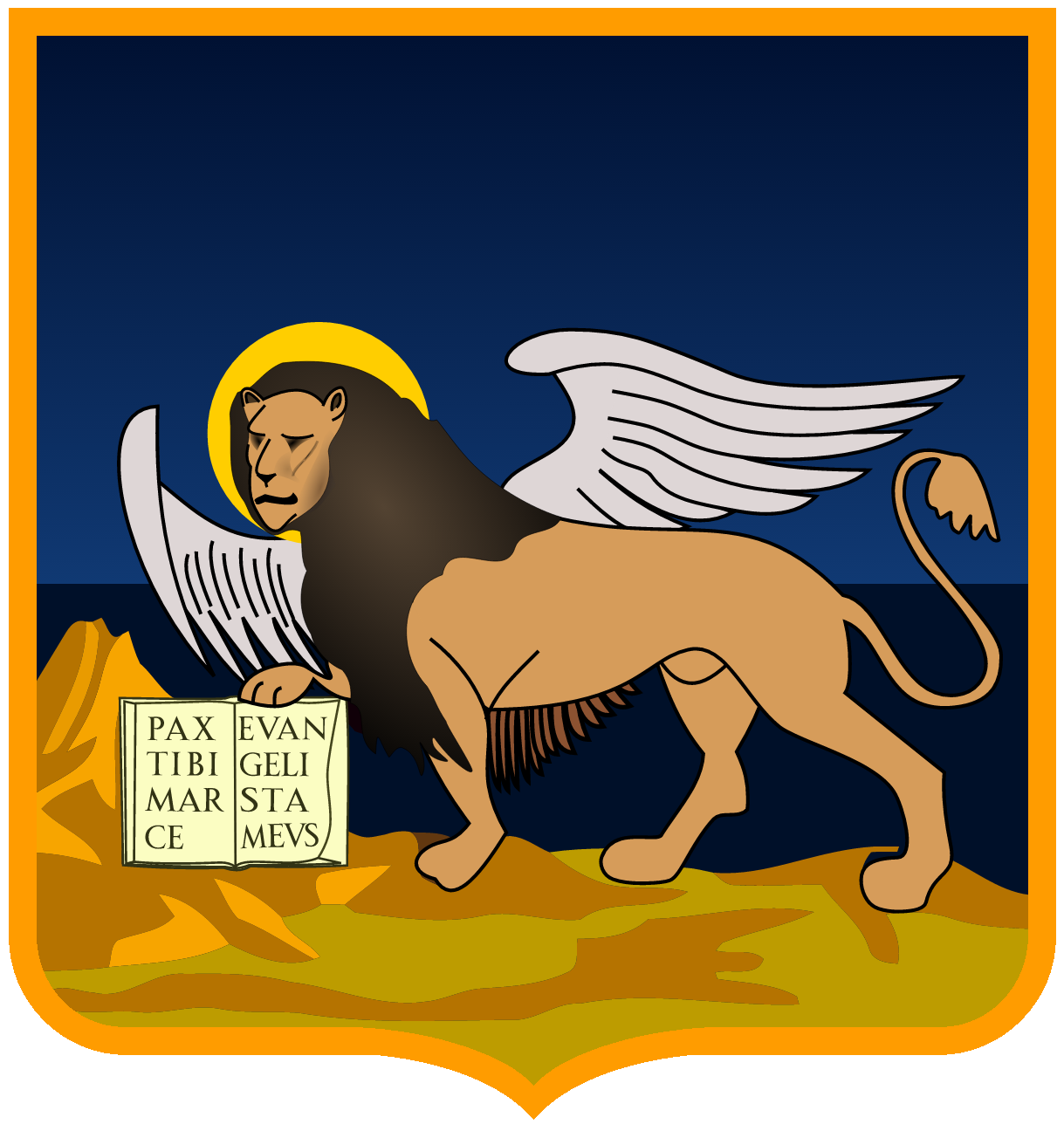
Veneto

== Former colonies ==
The coats of arms of the Italian colonies.

This gallery include the lesser coats of arms. The years given are for the coats of arms.

Italian concession in Tientsin
(1901–1947)

Italian Tripolitania
(1912–1934)

Italian Cyrenaica
(1927–1934)

Italian Libya
(1934–1943)

Italian Somaliland
(1889–1936)

Italian Eritrea
(1890–1936)

Italian East Africa
(1936–1941)

Italian Aegean Islands
(1937–1947)

Italian Albania
(1939–1943)

Trust Territory of Somalia
(1954–1956)

Trust Territory of Somalia
(1956–1960)

== See also ==
- Coat of arms of Italy
