= Giuseppe Prina =

Italian statesman (1766–1814)

Giuseppe Prina in 1781

Count Giuseppe Prina (20 July 1766 in Novara – 20 April 1814) was an Italian statesman killed in the Milan riots of 1814.

== Biography ==
Prina gave early evidence of his rare talent. After studying at the University of Pavia, he became a doctor of law in 1789. He worked in his native town, Novara, for some years as a lawyer.

From 1791 he was appointed with different charges in the Piedmontese administration of the Kingdom of Sardinia. In the first years of the French invasion of Piedmont, Prina refused any collaboration with the French, but after the Battle of Marengo, he returned to public life. Napoleon Bonaparte appointed Prina Minister of Finance first in 1802 for the Italian Republic and then in 1805 for the new Kingdom of Italy.

Genial in private life, he was harsh and unyielding in his official capacity. His singular skill in devising fresh taxes to meet the enormous demands of Napoleon's government made him the most-hated man in Lombardy. This was further intensified because he was a Piedmontese and he was regarded as a foreigner.

=== Murder ===
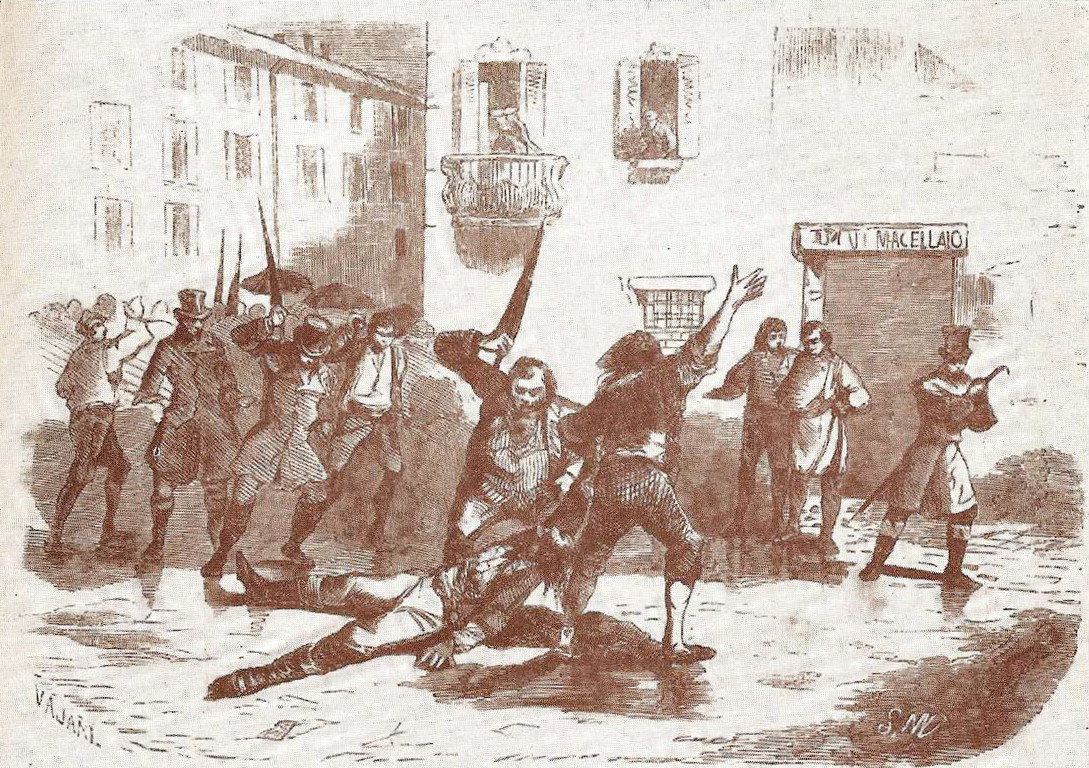
Prina's murder in a contemporary print

The news of the emperor's forced abdication on 11 April 1814 reached Milan on the 16th, and raised hopes of Italian independence. The Senate assembled on 19 April and Prina's party suggested that delegates should be despatched to Vienna to request that Eugene Beauharnais be raised to the throne of a free Italian kingdom. Despite precautions, the suggestion became public and provoked the formidable riot called the "battle of the umbrellas". A furious mob burst into the senate on 20 April 1814, pillaged its halls and searched for Prina. Not finding him there, the rioters rushed to his residence, the former Palazzo Sannazzari, which they wrecked, and seized the doomed minister, who was discovered in a remote chamber donning a disguise. Over the course of four hours, the angry rioters dragged him about the town, until wounded, mutilated, almost torn to pieces, Prina received his death blow.

The mob then insulted his miserable remains, stuffing stamped paper into his mouth. These indignities were enacted by day, in a thoroughfare crowded with citizens sheltered from the rain by umbrellas. The authorities were passive, and although some courageous persons actually rescued the victim at an early stage and concealed him in a friendly house, the mob soon discovered his refuge and were about to force an entrance, when the dying man surrendered to save his saviours' property. The riots and murder directly contributed to the re-establishment of Austrian rule in Milan.

The murder of Prina is the subject of a satirical poem in the Milanese dialect by Tommaso Grossi entitled La Prineide, and of a play by Gerolamo Rovetta entitled Principio di secolo.

== Bibliography ==
- Massimo Fabi (1860). Milano e il ministro Prina. Novara: Agostino Pedroli.
- Francesco Lemmi (1902). La Restaurazione austriaca a Milano nel 1814. Bologna: Nicola Zanichelli.
- Ugo Foscolo (1860). "Alcune parole intorno alla fine del Regno d'Italia". Milano e il ministro Prina. Novara: Agostino Pedroli. pp. 179–208.
