= Kingdom of Italy (Napoleonic) =

State in northern Italy (1805–1814)

Kingdom of Italy Regno d'Italia (Italian) Royaume d'Italie (French)
- 1805–1814
- Flag Coat of arms

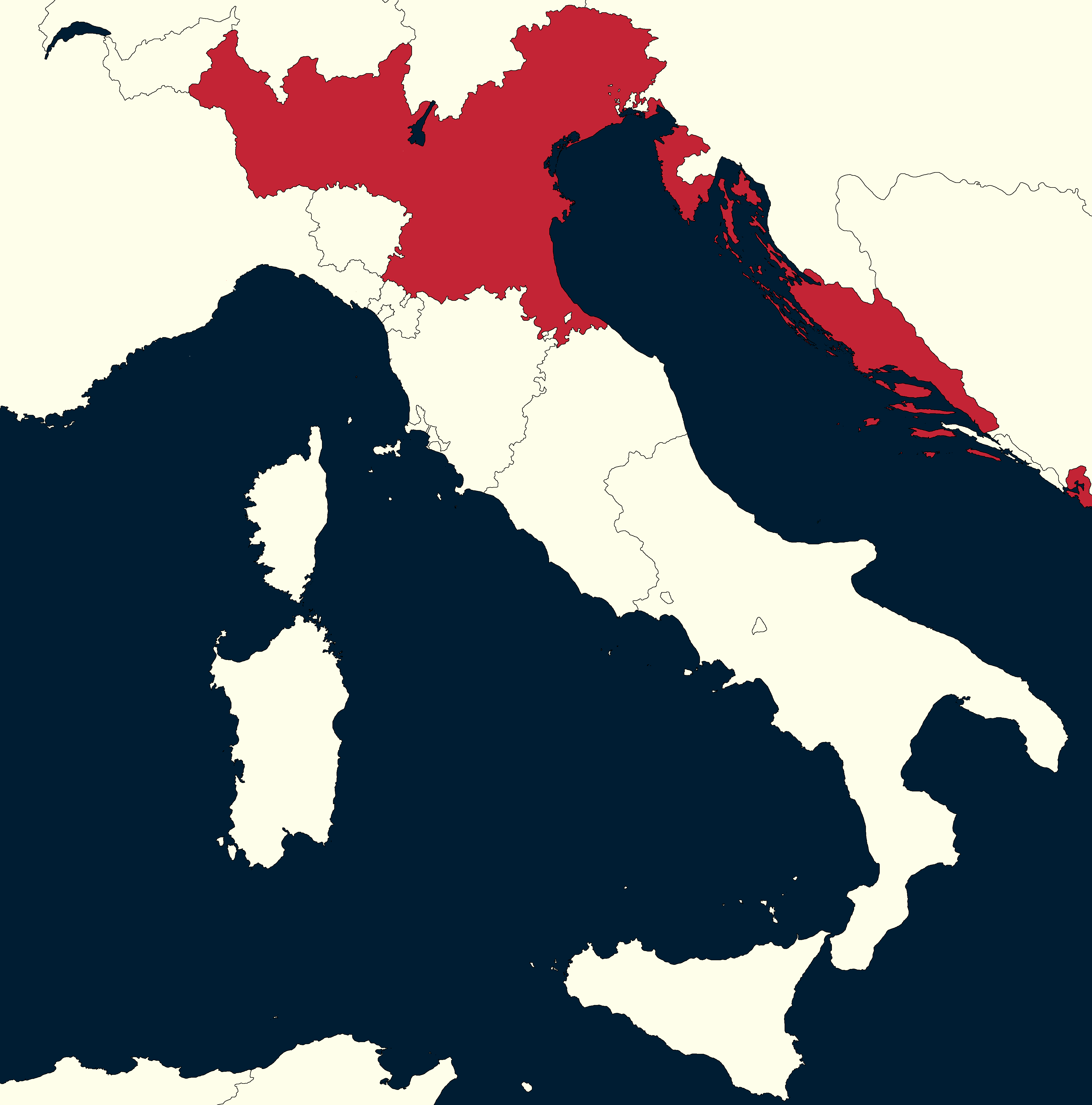
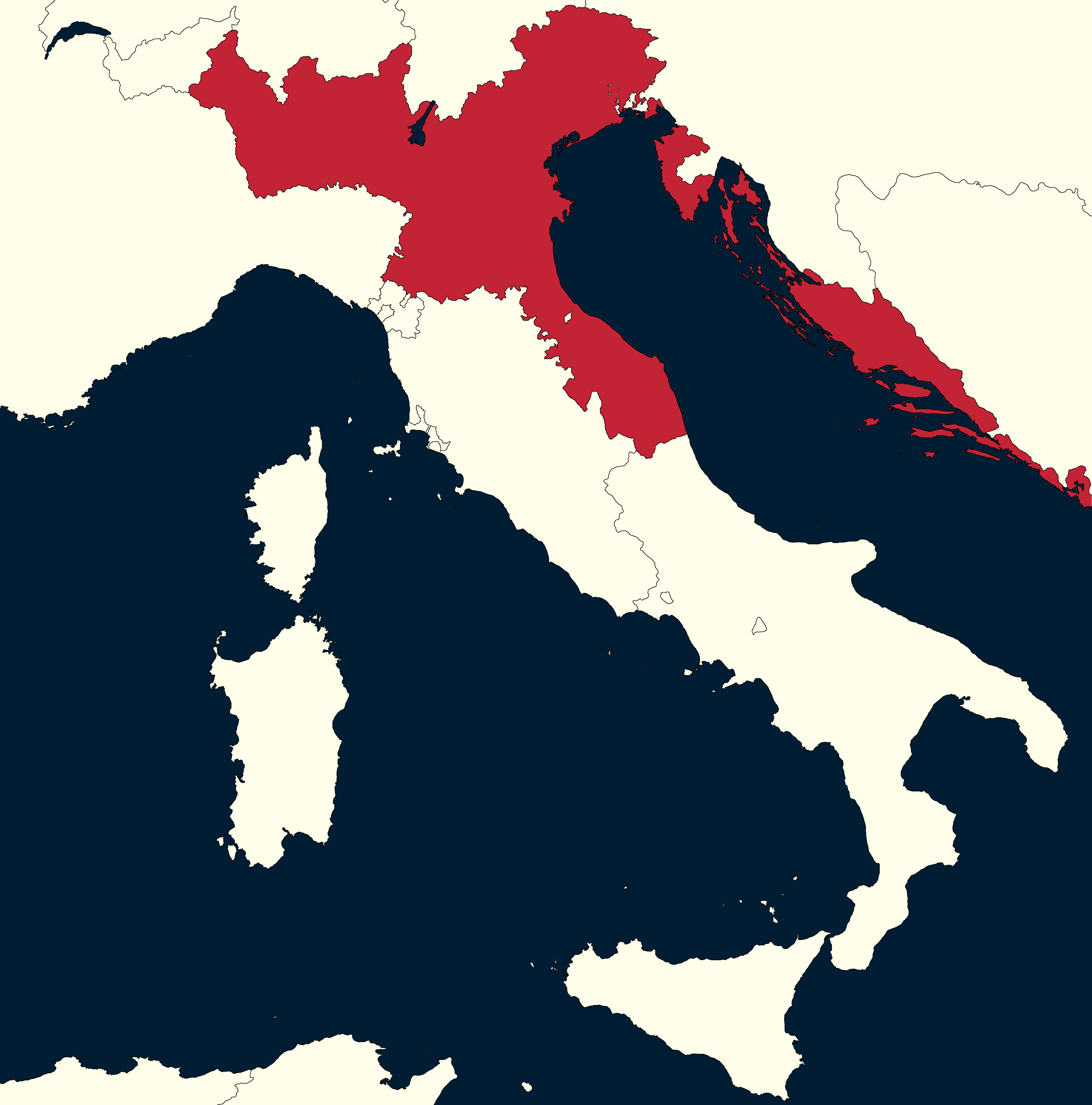
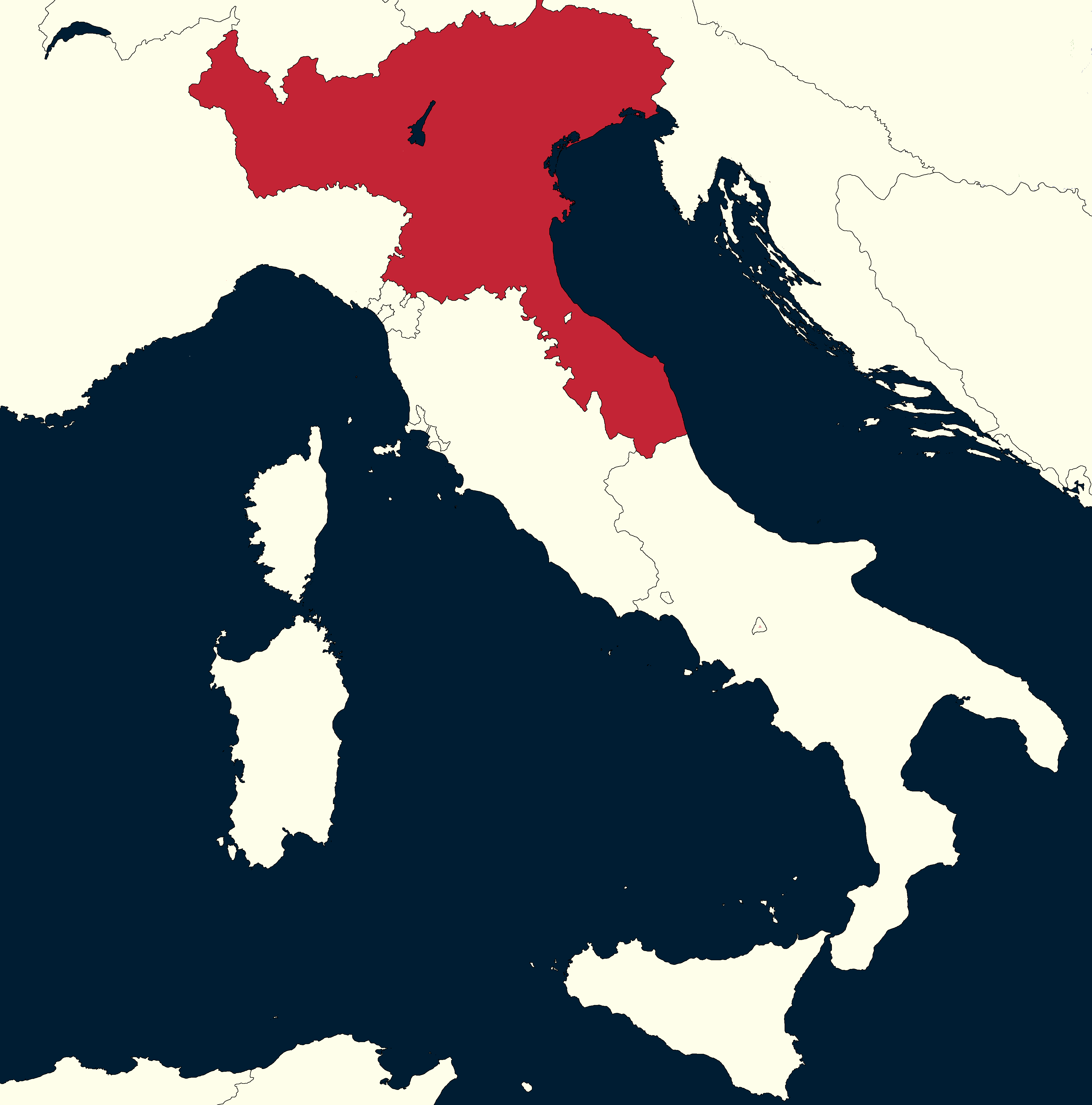
- Status: Client state of the French Empire
- Capital: Milan
- Official languages: Italian; French
- Religion: Catholic
- Government: Unitary absolute monarchy
- King
  - 1805–1814: Napoleon I
- Viceroy
  - 1805–1814: Eugène de Beauharnais
- Legislature: Consultant Senate
- Historical era: Napoleonic Wars
  - Proclamation: 17 March 1805
  - Constitution adopted: 19 March 1805
  - Coronation of Napoleon I: 23 May 1805
  - Peace of Pressburg: 26 December 1805
  - Battle of the Mincio River: 8 February 1814
  - Treaty of Fontainebleau: 11 April 1814
  - Treaty of Paris: 30 May 1814

Area
  - 1808: 20,500 sq mi (53,000 km^{2})

Population
  - 1808: 5,800,000
- Currency: Italian lira
Preceded by
First French Empire
Italian Republic
Venetian Province
Papal States
Republic of Noli
Republic of Ragusa
Succeeded by
Kingdom of Lombardy–Venetia
Kingdom of Sardinia
Duchy of Modena and Reggio
Papal States
Austrian Empire

The Kingdom of Italy (Italian: Regno d'Italia; French: Royaume d'Italie) was a kingdom in Northern Italy (formerly the Italian Republic) that was a client state of Napoleon's French Empire. It was fully influenced by revolutionary France and ended with Napoleon's defeat and fall. Its government was assumed by Napoleon as King of Italy and the viceroyalty delegated to his stepson Eugène de Beauharnais.

It covered some of Piedmont and the modern regions of Lombardy, Veneto, Emilia-Romagna, Friuli-Venezia Giulia, Trentino, South Tyrol, and Marche. Napoleon I also ruled the rest of northern and central Italy in the form of Nice, Aosta, Piedmont, Liguria, Tuscany, Umbria, and Lazio, but directly as part of the French Empire (as departments), rather than as part of a vassal state.

At its peak, the kingdom covered 84,000 square kilometers and had a population of 6.5 million.

== Constitutional statutes ==
The Kingdom of Italy was born on 17 March 1805, when the Italian Republic, whose president was Napoleon Bonaparte, became the Kingdom of Italy, with the same man (now styled Napoleon I) as the new King of Italy and his 24-year-old stepson Eugène de Beauharnais as his viceroy. Napoleon I was crowned at the Milan Cathedral, Milan on 23 May, with the Iron Crown of Lombardy. His title was "Emperor of the French and King of Italy" (French: Empereur des Français et Roi d'Italie, Italian: Imperatore dei Francesi e Re d'Italia), showing the importance of this Italian kingdom to him.

Even though the republican constitution was never formally abolished, a series of Constitutional Statutes completely altered it. The first one was proclaimed two days after the birth of the kingdom, on 19 March, when the Consulta declared Napoleon I as king and established that one of his natural or adopted sons would succeed him once the Napoleonic Wars were over, and once separated the two thrones were to remain separate. The second one, dating from 29 March, regulated the regency, the Great Officials of the kingdom, and the oaths.

The most important was the third, proclaimed on 5 June, being the real constitution of the kingdom: Napoleon I was the head of state and had the full powers of government; in his absence, he was represented by the Viceroy, Eugène de Beauharnais. The Consulta, Legislative Council, and Speakers were all merged into a Council of State, whose opinions became only optional and not binding for the king. The Legislative Body, the old parliament, remained in theory, but it was never summoned after 1805; the Napoleonic Code was introduced on 21 March 1804.

The fourth Statute, decided on 16 February 1806, indicated Beauharnais as the heir to the throne.

The fifth and sixth Statutes, on 21 March 1808, separated the Consulta from the Council of State and renamed it the Senate, with the duty of informing the king about the wishes of his most important subjects.

The seventh Statute, on 21 September, created a new nobility of dukes, counts, and barons; the eighth and the ninth, on 15 March 1810, established the annuity for the members of the royal family. In 1812, a Court of Accounts was added.

The government had seven ministers:

- The Minister of War was at first General Augusto Caffarelli, later General Giuseppe Danna for a year, and then, from 1811, General Achille Fontanelli;
- The Minister of Interior was at first Ludovico Arborio di Breme and then, from 1809, Luigi Vaccari;
- The Minister for Foreign Affairs was Ferdinando Marescalchi;
- The Minister of Justice and Great Judge was Giuseppe Luosi;
- The Minister of the Treasury was Antonio Veneri and then, from 1811, Ambrogio Birago;
- The Minister of Finance was Giuseppe Prina;
- The Minister of Religion was Giovanni Bovara.

=== Image gallery ===
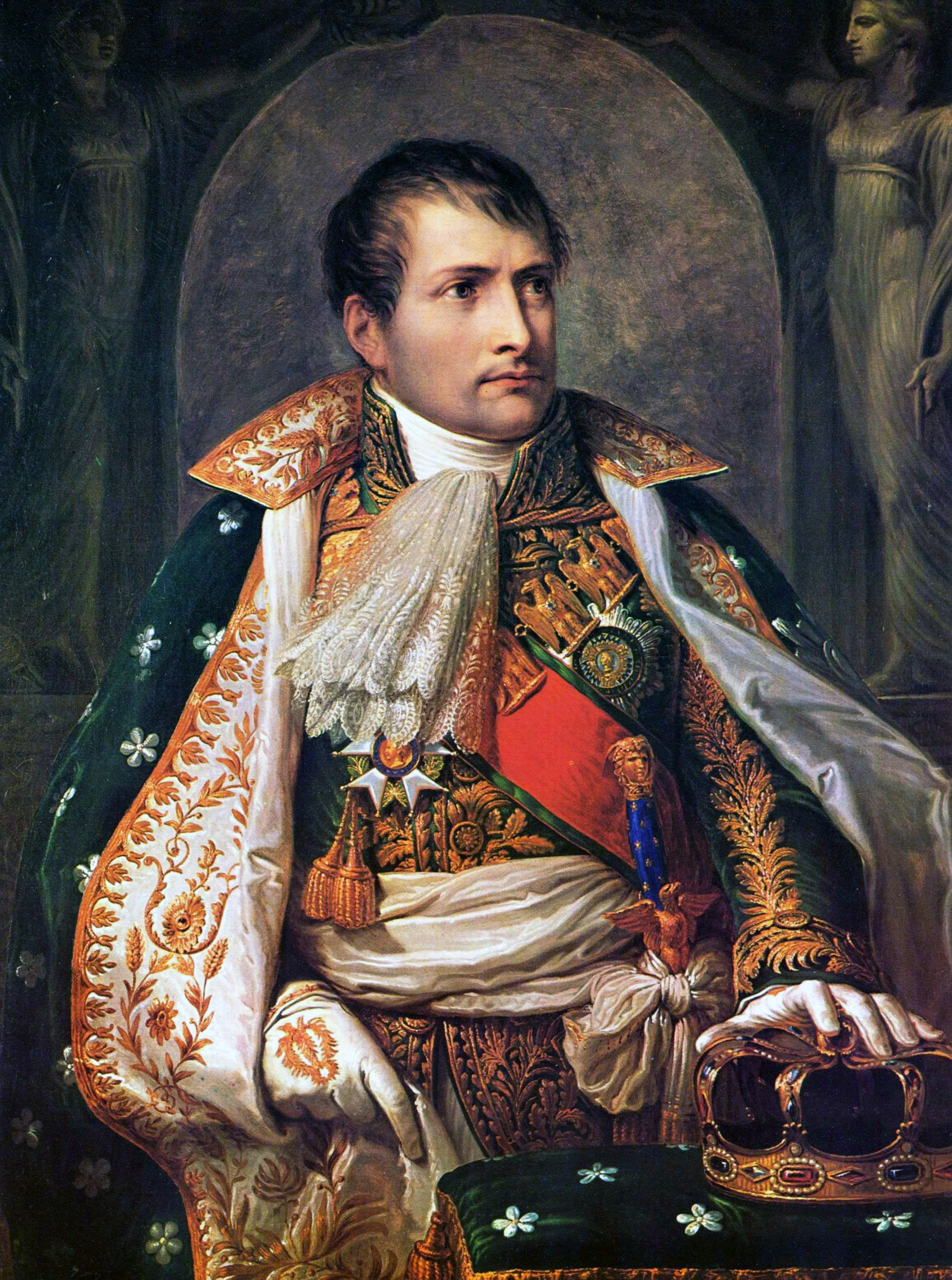
Napoleon I,
King of Italy
(1805–1814)

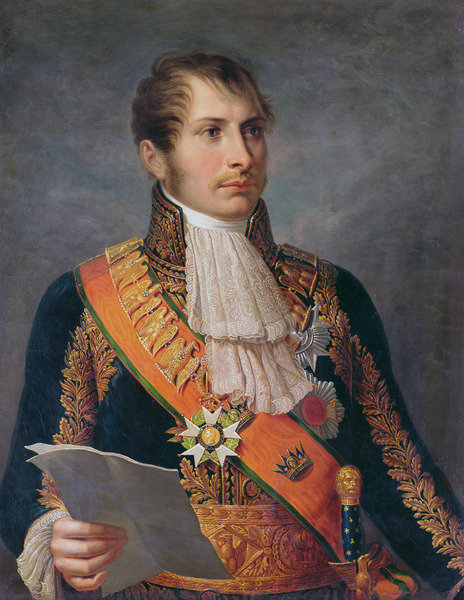
Eugène de Beauharnais,
Viceroy of Italy
(1805–1814)

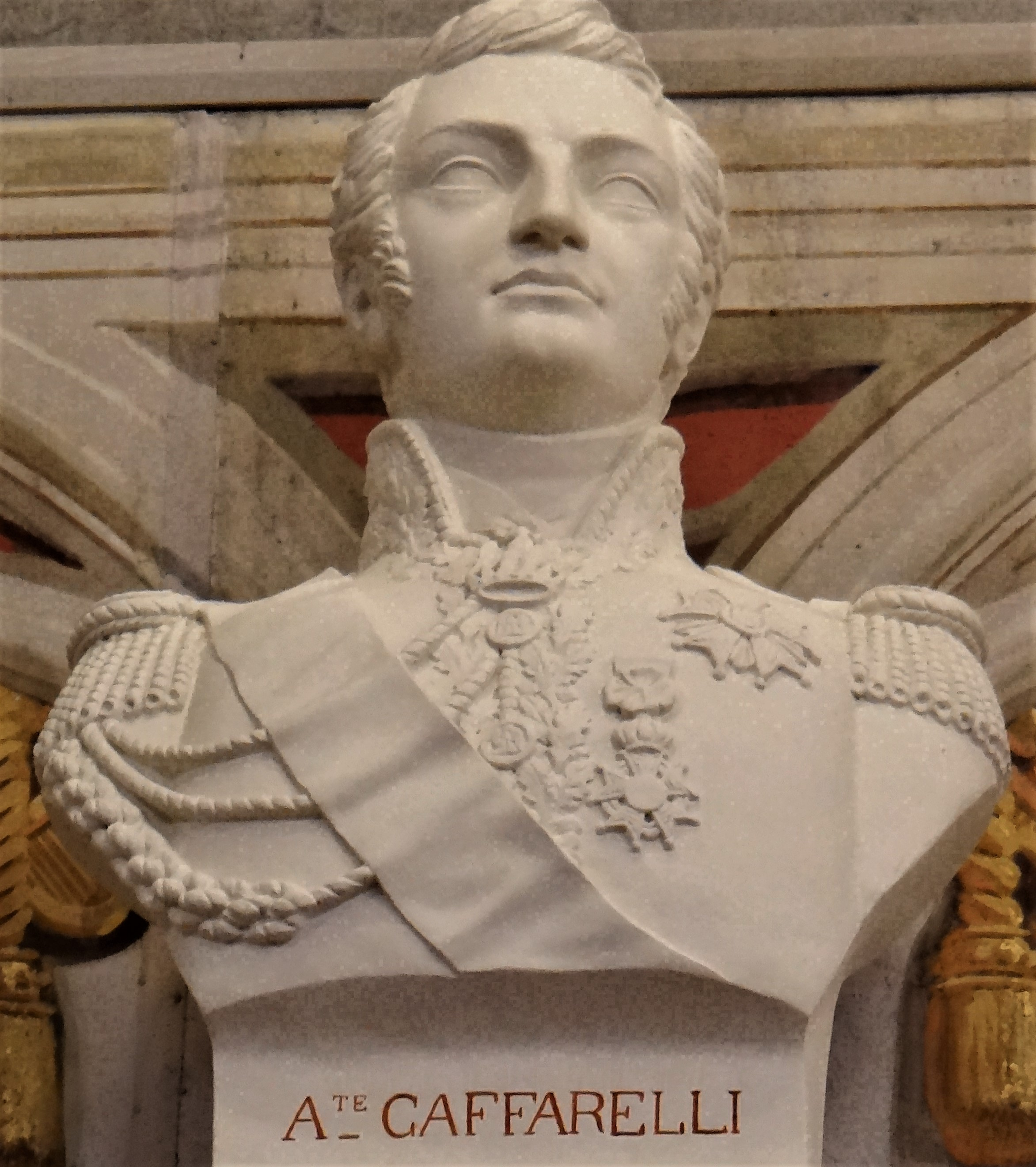
Augusto Caffarelli,
Minister of War
(1806–1810)

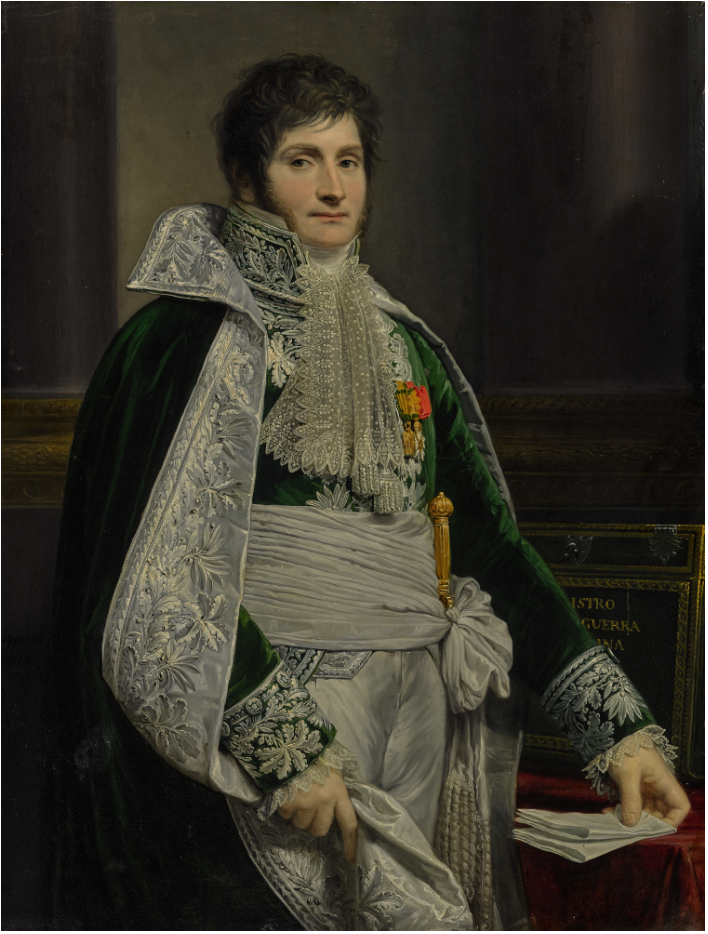
Achille Fontanelli,
Minister of War
(1811–1813)

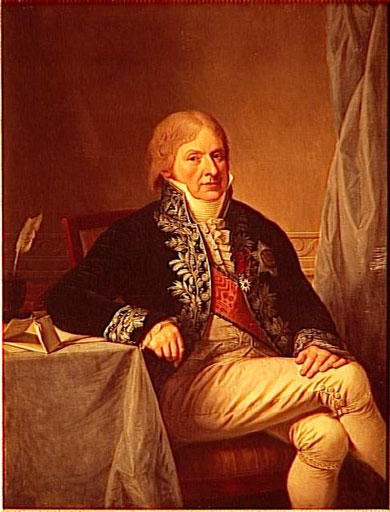
Ferdinando Marescalchi,
Minister of Foreign Affairs
(1805–1814)

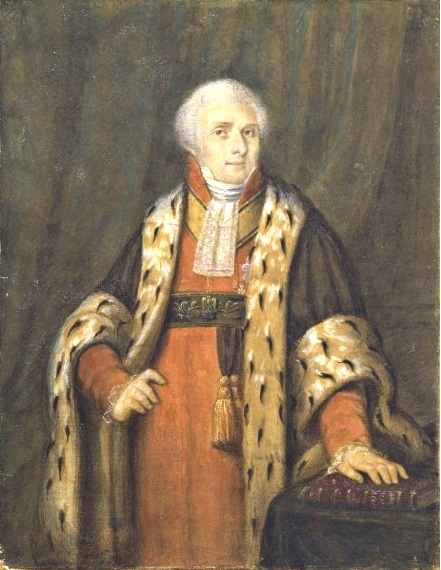
Giuseppe Luosi,
Minister of Justice
(1805–1814)

== Territory ==
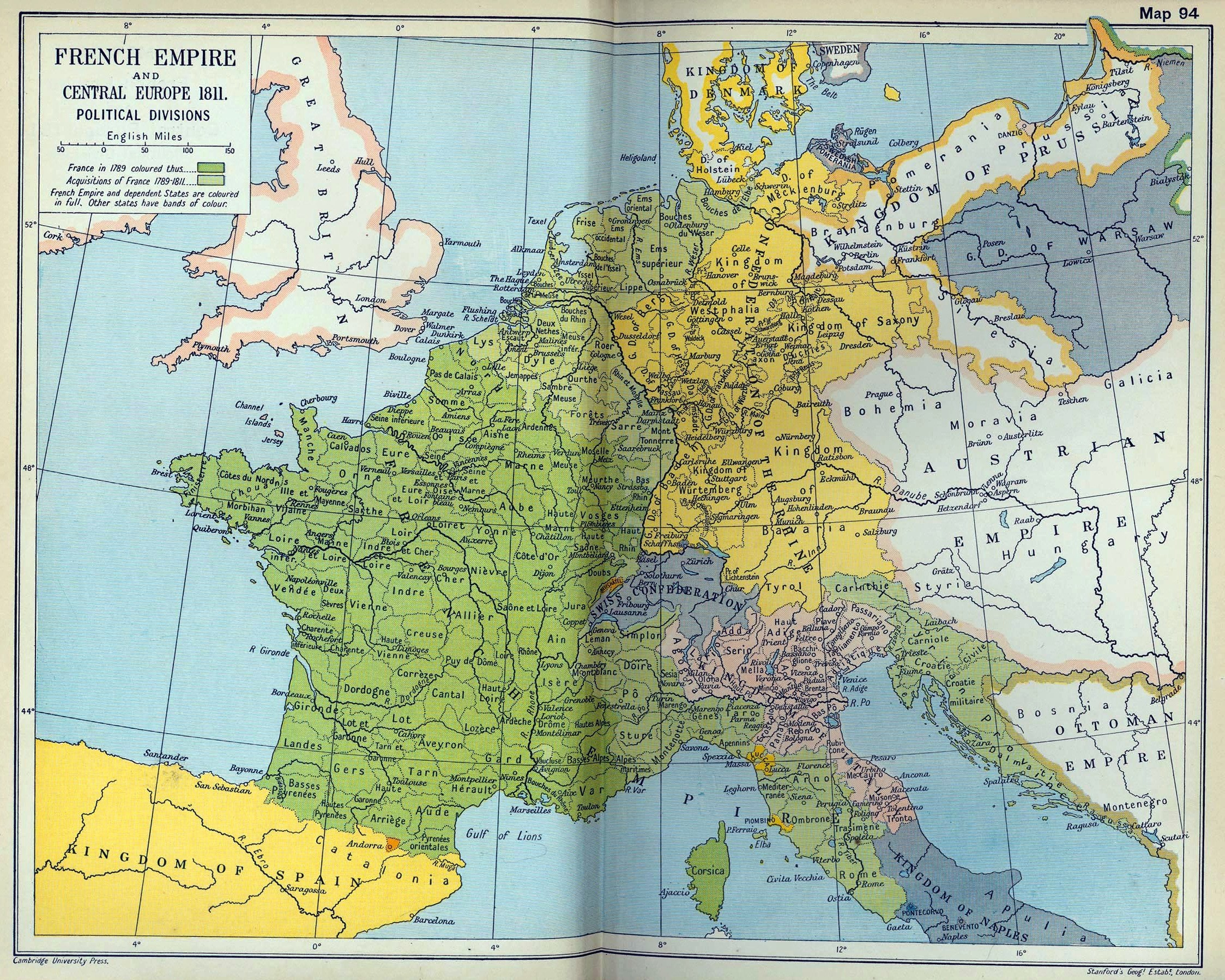
The Kingdom of Italy and its Departements (1811) (in pink colour)

Originally, the Kingdom consisted of the territories of the Italian Republic: the former Duchy of Milan, Duchy of Mantua, Duchy of Modena, the western part of the Republic of Venice, part of the Papal States in Romagna, and the Department of Agogna (it) centred on Novara.

After the defeat of the Third Coalition and the consequent Treaty of Pressburg, on 26 December 1805, the Kingdom gained from Austria the eastern and remaining part of the Venetian territories, including Istria and Dalmatia with Cattaro, though it lost Massa and Carrara to Elisa Bonaparte's Principality of Lucca and Piombino. The Duchy of Guastalla was annexed on 24 May.

With the Convention of Fontainebleau with Austria of 10 October 1807, Italy ceded Monfalcone to Austria and gained Gradisca, putting the new border on the Isonzo river.

The conquered Republic of Ragusa was annexed in spring 1808 by General Auguste de Marmont. On 2 April 1808, following the dissolution of the Papal States, the Kingdom annexed the present-day Marches. At its maximum extent, the Kingdom had 6,700,000 inhabitants and comprised 2,155 comunes.

The final arrangement resulted from Austria's defeat in the War of the Fifth Coalition. Emperor Napoleon and King Maximilian I Joseph of Bavaria signed the Treaty of Schönbrunn on 14 October 1809, exchanging territories in Italy and Germany. Bavaria ceded southern Tyrol to the Kingdom of Italy, which in turn ceded Istria, Dalmatia and Ragusa to France, incorporating the eastern Adriatic territories into France's Illyrian Provinces. Small changes to the borders between Italy and France in Garfagnana and Friuli came into effect on 5 August 1811.

In practice, the Kingdom was a dependency of the French Empire.

The Kingdom served as a theater in Napoleon's operations against Austria during the wars of the various coalitions. Trading with the United Kingdom of Great Britain and Ireland was forbidden under the Continental System.

== Currency ==
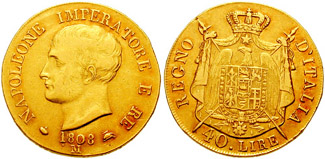
40 lire coin of the Regno d'Italia (1808)

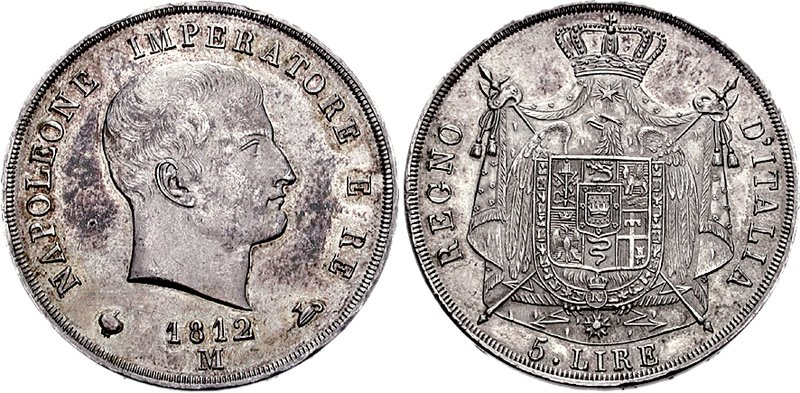
5 lire coin of the Regno d'Italia (1812)

The kingdom was given a new national currency, replacing the local coins circulating in the country: the Italian lira, of the same size, weight, and metal of the French franc. Mintage being decided by Napoleon with an imperial decree on 21 March 1806, the production of the new coins began in 1807. The monetary unit was the silver lira, which weighed 5 grams. There were multiples of £2 (10 grams of silver) and £5 (25 grams of silver), and precious coins of £20 (6.45 grams of gold) and £40 (12.9 grams of gold). The lira was basically divided in 100 cents, and there were coins of 1 cent (2.1 grams of copper), 3 cents (6.3 grams of copper), and 10 cents (2 grams of poor silver), but following the tradition, there was a division in 20 soldi, with coins of 1 soldo (10.5 grams of copper, in practice 5 cents), 5 soldi (1.25 grams of silver), 10 soldi (2.5 grams of silver), and 15 soldi (3.75 grams of silver).

== Army ==
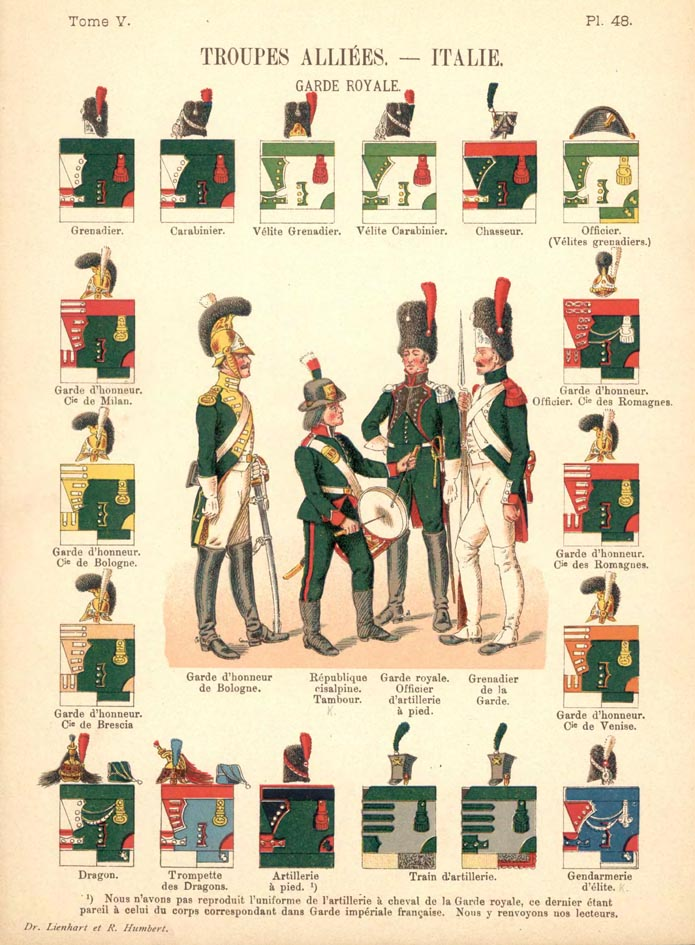
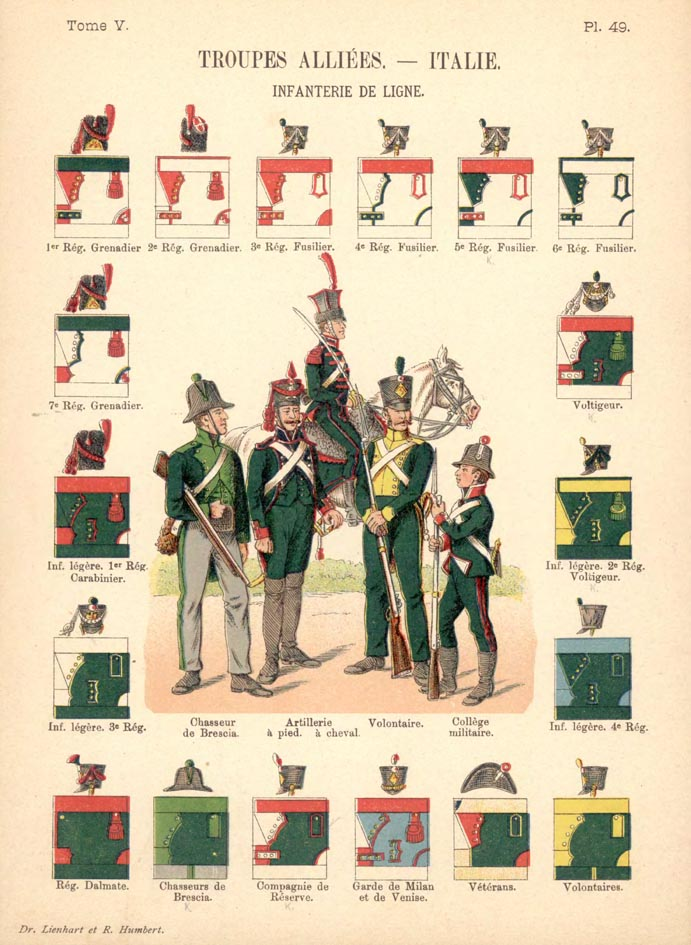
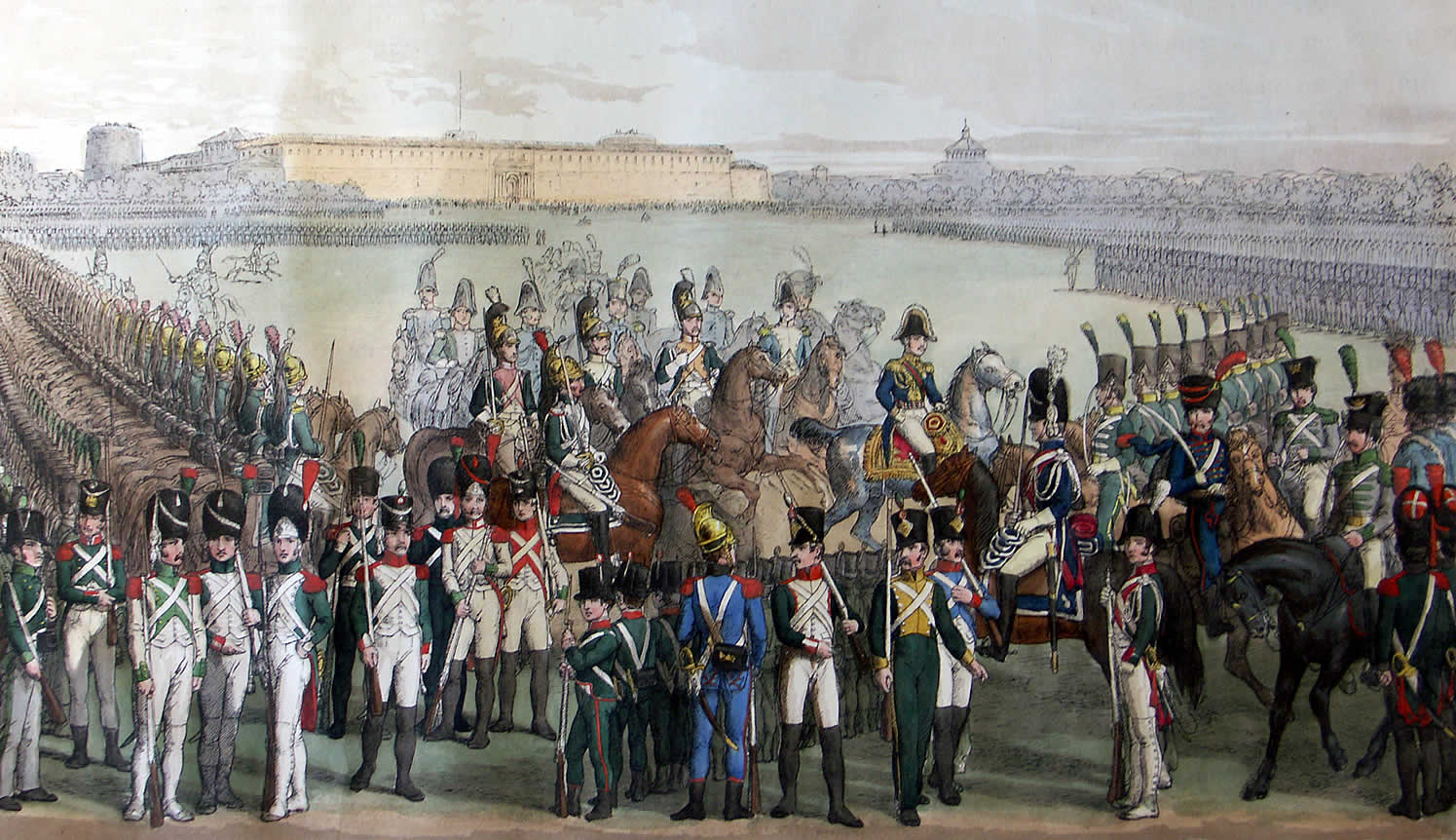
Clockwise from top:
- Troop uniforms of the Kingdom of Italy, 1805–15
- Military parade in 1812

The regions of the Napoleonic Kingdom of Italy had been borderline demilitarized in the prior century, and it was a popular sentiment among French and Italian administrators that the Italians had no military value. Napoleon was conscious of the challenge of creating an effective army in a country where the traditional military spirit had disappeared. However, after much work and reform, the army finally reached both its quantitative conscription goals and qualitative parity in training and discipline with regular French army units by 1810-1812. Between 1800 and 1812, the Kingdom of Italy, with a population of somewhat over 6 million, supplied 200,000 soldiers to Napoleon's armies. Due to their extensive employment in the Peninsular War and the Russian campaign, they nonetheless had high casualty rates. In addition to these 200,000, a similar number of troops were conscripted from the Italian provinces directly annexed into the French Empire. Thus 400,000 Italian soldiers fought for France in the Napoleonic Wars, excluding those who served in the army of the Kingdom of Naples. At least three-quarters of these men served outside of Italy.

The army of the Kingdom derived from that of the Republic, which conscripted 31,200 civilians between 1803 and 1805. The two Hussar regiments were converted into Dragoons and renamed Regina (Queen's Dragoons) and Napoleone (Napoleon's Dragoons), this brigade became the main cavalry force of the Kingdom in all campaigns. The Presidential Guards of the Republic were renamed the Royal Guards, to which was added, in 1806, the regiment of Royal Velites. In 1805, the Kingdom had, in addition to the two Dragoon regiments and the Royal Guards, five line and two light Infantry regiments, along with one light Cavalry (Chasseurs à Cheval) and one Artillery regiment. In 1807, the Jäger battalion Brescia was increased to three battalions and renamed the 3rd Light regiment. Also in 1807, the Royal Dalmatian regiment and the Jäger battalion Istria were formed by recruits from the former Venetian domains attached to the Kingdom. By the end of 1808, the overall combat strength was increased from two to three combat battalions per regiment, with the creation of the 6th and 7th Line regiments from the areas of the Papal States now attached to the Kingdom, and the 2nd Light cavalry. In 1809, an additional regiment, the 4th Light, was formed, and the companies of the Jäger battalion Istria were reassigned to the 1st and 2nd Light, along with two more cavalry regiments, the 3rd and 4th Light (Chasseurs à Cheval), being formed in 1810.

The years 1806-13, excluding volunteers, saw the conscription of 128,316 civilians for the military, from every département of the Kingdom with peak conscriptions between 1810 and 1812. Unlike the Republic the units of the Kingdom were inserted into the Grande Armée and deployed to and employed in foreign campaigns. The last units of the Kingdom were disbanded on 11 February 1814, the divisions Palombini and Zucchi, after a final engagement on the Mincio, and the divisions Severoli and Lechi following the Convention of Mantua.

From 1808 to 1813, entire Italian divisions served in the Peninsular War. In early 1808, Giuseppe Lechi was deployed and commanded the 2nd Division in Duhesme's Observatory Corps. The division consisted of units levied in Italy and in Naples. In early 1809, a second all-Italian division was sent to Spain under Domenico Pino and attached to Saint-Cyr's VII Corps as the 5th Division. Lechi's all-Italian division, except for the 1st Line regiment "Re" from Naples, was by now also attached to the VII Corps and designated the 6th Division. In early 1810, the two divisions merged under Pino and formed the all-Italian 2nd Division of the VII Corps, though the 5th Italian Line was assigned to Duhaseme's 4th Division, and the 1st Neapolitan joined with the 2nd Neapolitan Line in Verdier's 3rd Division. In May 1811, the 5th Line, along with the 4th and 6th Line as well as the 2nd Light of the 2nd Division, transferred to the command of Harispe for the siege of Tarragona. In late 1811, these units formed the "Italian Division" of the Army of Aragon under Palombini at Saguntum and Valencia. For a brief period, Peyri was in command. In the same year, a second Italian division was created under Severoli and attached to the reserve corps. In late 1812, Palombini's division was attached to the Army of the Center before being transferred in early 1813 to the Army of the North, whereas Severoli remained in reserve of the Army of Aragon, and the 7th Line garrisoned Tarragona. By mid-1813, the Italian units were reduced to a brigade and attached to the reserve under Saint-Paul; the complete departure followed in December 1813. Overall, between 1808 and 1813, the Kingdom of Italy provided 30,183 soldiers, of which only 8,958 returned; the rest fell to combat and disease. The units fought amongst others at Roses, Cardadeu, Molins de Rei, Valls, Gerona at El Pla, Figueras and Valencia, and especially distinguishing themselves under Suchet at Tarragona and Saguntum.

In 1809, Eugène's Army of Italy formed the right wing of Napoleon I's invasion of the Austrian Empire, winning a considerable victory at Raab and having a respectable share in the victory at Wagram.

In 1812, Eugène de Beauharnais commanded the IV Corps of the Grande Armée, which invaded Russia. It included two divisions levied in the Kingdom of Italy, the 15th (Italian) Infantry Division commanded by Gen. Domenico Pino and the Italian Royal Guard division under Gen. Teodoro Lechi. The Italians took part in every battle of the IV Corps (Smolensk, Borodino) under the Viceroy, including the battle of the retreat (Maloyaroslavets and Krasnoi). In total 27,000 troops of the Kingdom of Italy marched into Russia. The Italian contingent distinguished themselves at Borodino and Maloyaroslavets, receiving the recognition:

"The Italian army had displayed qualities which entitled it evermore to take rank amongst the bravest troops of Europe."

Only 1,000–2,000 Italians survived the Russian campaign, but they returned with most of their banners secured. In 1813, Eugène de Beauharnais held out as long as possible against the onslaught of the Austrians (Battle of the Mincio) and was later forced to sign an armistice in February 1814.

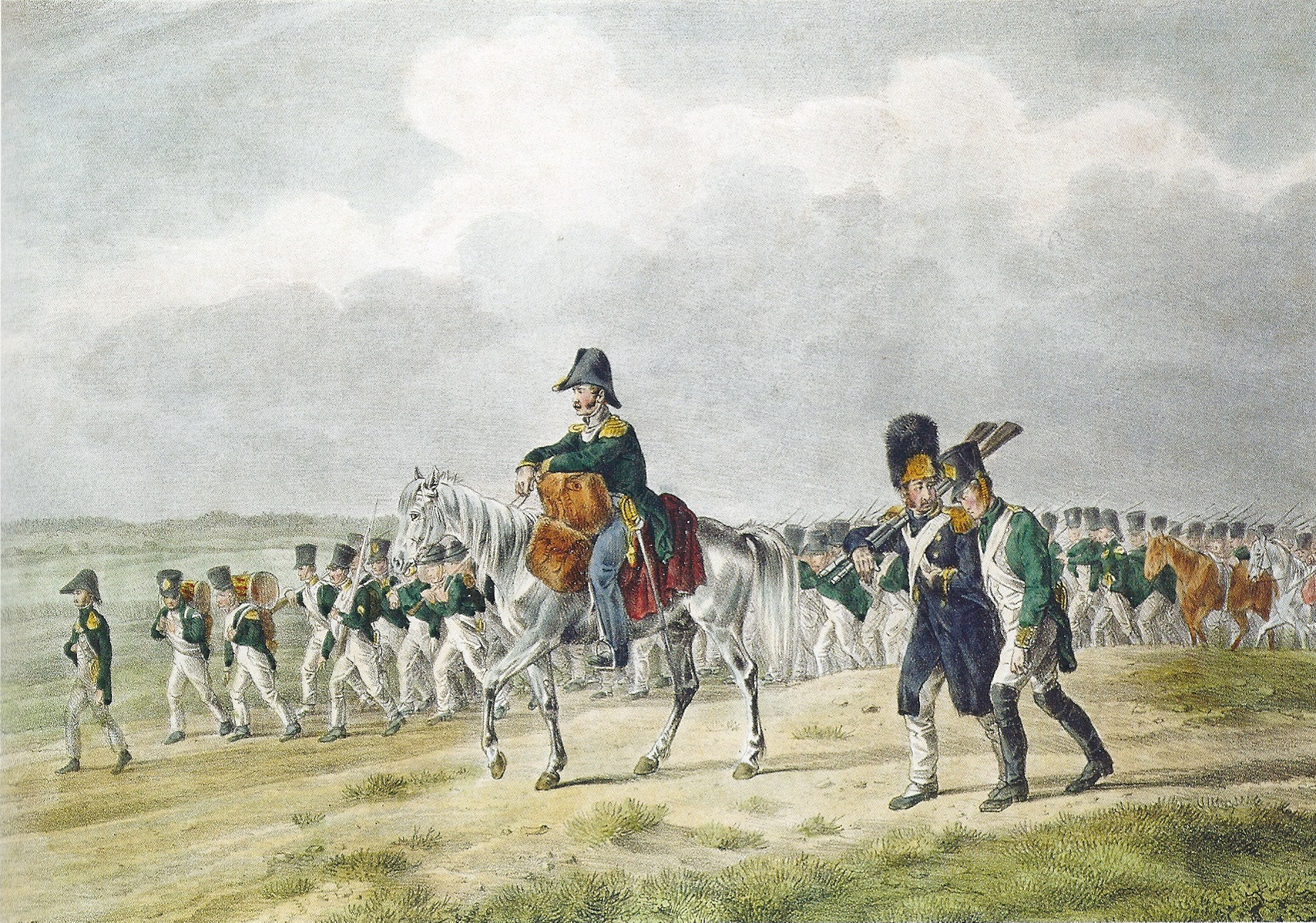
Italian troops of the Grande Armée's IV Corps struggling from the thirst and heat in Russia

Infantry:

- Line infantry: five regiments from the Italian Republic, with two more later raised, in 1805 and 1808.
- Light infantry: three regiments from the Italian Republic, plus another one raised in 1811.
- Royal Guard: two battalions from the Italian Republic (Granatieri and Cacciatori), plus other two (Velites) raised in 1806, plus two battalions of young guard raised in 1810, and another two raised in 1811.

Cavalry:

- Dragoons: two regiments from the Italian Republic.
- Cacciatori a Cavallo (light horse): one regiment from the Italian Republic, plus three others, raised in 1808, 1810, and 1811.
- Royal Guard: two squadrons of dragoons, five companies of Guards of Honour.

== Local administration ==
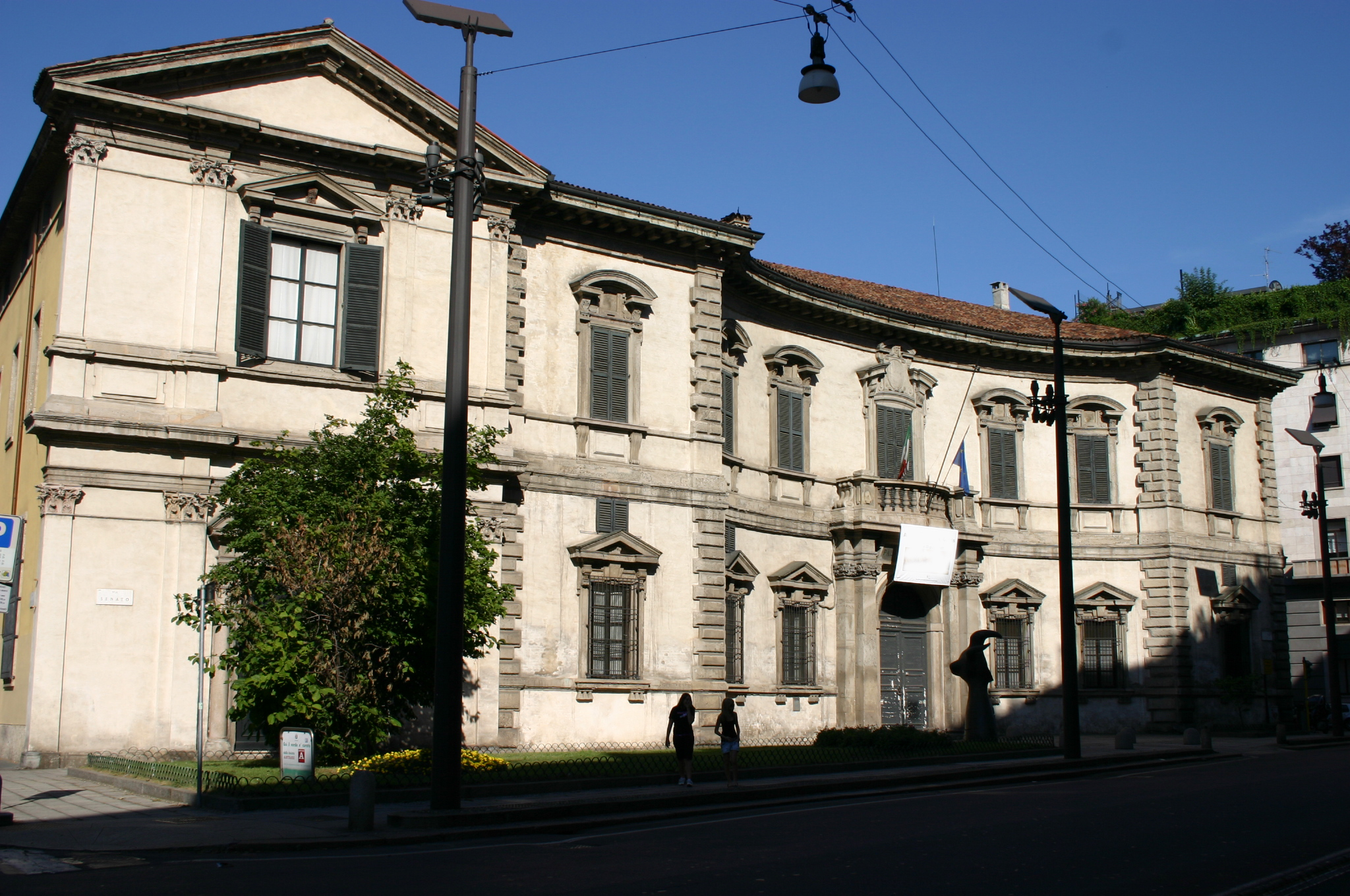
The Palace of the Senate, Milan

The Consulte de Lyon meeting in 1802, which gave birth to the Italian Republic

The administrative system of the Kingdom was firstly drawn by a law on 8 June 1805. The state was divided, following the French system, into 14 départements; the twelve inherited from the republican era, plus Adda (Sondrio) and Adige (Verona). The chief of the department, the prefect, was the State's representative in each province, improved the administrative decisions of the central government, controlled the local authorities, led the police and, differently from the republican era, had all the executive powers in its territory. The local legislative body was the General Council, composed by the representatives of the comunes.

The departments were divided in districts, equivalent to the French arrondissements. The chief of the district was the vice-prefect, which had similar powers to the prefect, but over a smaller area. The local legislative body was the District Council, composed of eleven members. The districts were divided, as in France, into cantons, seats of Tax collectors and Justices of the peace.

The cantons were divided into comunes. The comunes had a City Council (Consiglio Comunale) of fifteen, thirty or forty members, chosen by the king or the prefect, depending on the comune size. The Council elected two, four or six Elders for the ordinary administration, helped by a City Secretary. The chief of biggest comunes were the royal Podestà, when in smaller comunes there was a prefectoral Mayor. All the city offices were held only by owners and traders, and the leadership of the owners was assured.

During the kingdom's life, the administrative system of the State changed for domestic and international reasons. Following the defeat of Austria and the Treaty of Pressburg, Napoleon annexed to Italy the territory of the former Republic of Venice, as announced on 30 March 1806, and ratified on 1 May. Seven new departments were created, six in the Venetian mainland, and one in Istria (Capodistria). Dalmatia received special institutions led by the General Provider Mr. Dandolo, and maintained its own laws. On 14 July 1807, the government passed a decree that reduced the number of comunes. Following the dissolution of the Papal States, the kingdom was extended along the Adriatic coast, and on 20 April 1808, three new departments were established. The final territorial change came into effect on 10 June 1810, when, as announced by Napoleon previously on 28 May, Italy lost Istria and the never fully incorporated Dalmatia, gaining as reward all the southern Tirol up to the city of Bolzano, creating the 24th and last department: Haut Adige.

=== Language and education ===
The language used officially in the Kingdom of Italy was Italian. The French language was used for ceremonies and in all relationships with France.

Education was made universal for all children, which was also conducted in Italian. By decree of the governor Vincenzo Dandolo, this was so even in Istria and Dalmatia, where local populations were more heterogeneous.

=== List of departments and districts ===
The Kingdom of Italy in 1812, when it was extended from Bolzano to central Adriatic Italy (Marche), losing at the same time Istria and Dalmatia

During its last maximum extension (from 1809 to 1814), the Kingdom lost Istria/Dalmatia but got added Bolzano/Alto Adige and consisted of 24 departments.

- Adda (capital Sondrio)
  - No districts
- Adige (capital Verona)
- Agogna (capital Novara)
  - District of Novara, District of Vigevano, District of Domodossola, District of Varallo, District of Arona
- Alto Adige (capital Trento)
- Crostolo (capital Reggio Emilia)
- Lario (capital Como)
  - District of Como, District of Varese, District of Menaggio, District of Lecco
- Lower Po (capital Ferrara)
- Mella (capital Brescia)
  - District of Brescia, District of Chiari, District of Verolanuova, District of Salò
- Mincio (capital Mantua)
  - District of Mantua, District of Revere, District of Castiglione
- Olona (capital Milan)
  - District of Milan, District of Pavia, District of Monza, District of Gallarate
- Panaro (capital Modena)
- Reno (capital Bologna)
- Rubicone (capital Cesena)
- Serio (capital Bergamo)
  - District of Bergamo, District of Treviglio, District of Clusone, District of Breno
- Upper Po (capital Cremona)
  - District of Cremona, District of Crema, District of Lodi, District of Casalmaggiore
- Adriatico (capital Venice)
- Bacchiglione (capital Vicenza)
- Brenta (capital Padua)
- Istria
- Passariano (capital Udine)
- Piave (capital Belluno)
- Tagliamento (capital Treviso)
- Metauro (capital Ancona)
- Musone (capital Macerata)
- Tronto (capital Fermo)

== Decline and fall ==
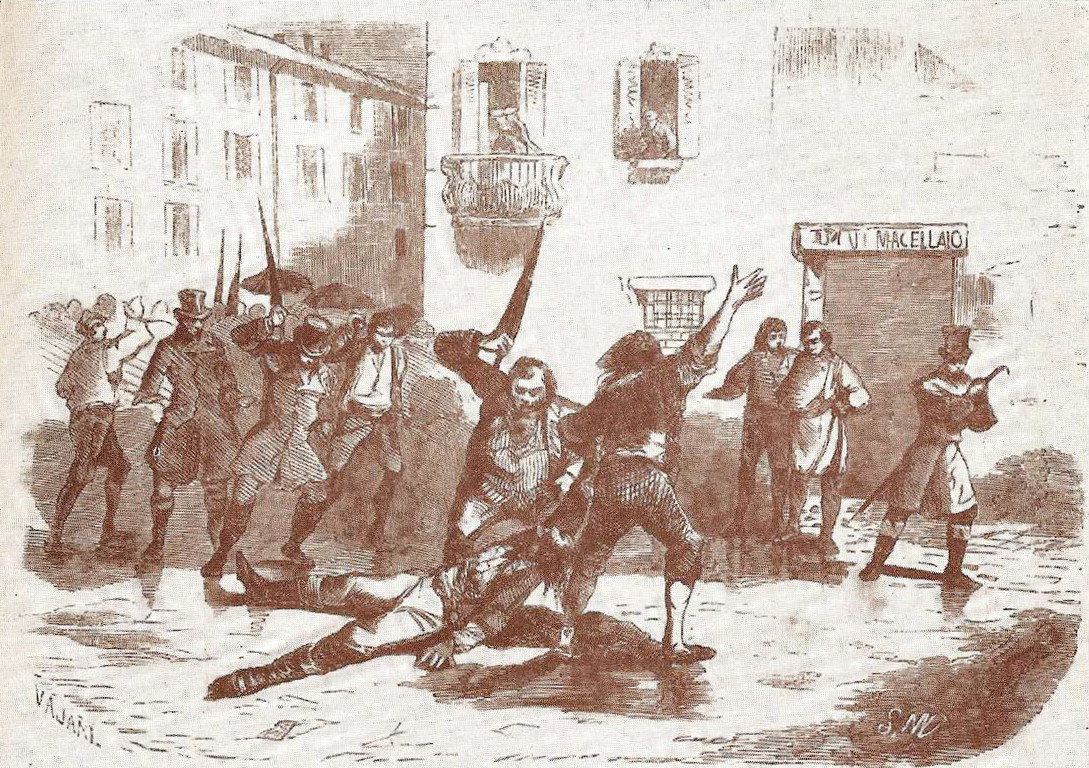
The murder of finance minister Prina in Milan marked the effective end of the kingdom.

When Napoleon abdicated both the thrones of France and Italy on 11 April 1814, Eugène de Beauharnais was lined up on the Mincio river with his army to repel any invasion from Germany or Austria, and he attempted to be crowned king. The Senate of the Kingdom was summoned on 17 April, but the senators showed themselves undecided in that chaotic situation. When a second session of the assembly took place on 20 April, the Milan insurrection foiled the Viceroy's plan. In the riots, finance minister Count Giuseppe Prina was massacred by the crowd, and the Great Electors disbanded the Senate and called the Austrian forces to protect the city, while a Provisional Regency Government under the presidency of Carlo Verri was appointed.

Eugène surrendered on 23 April, and was exiled to Bavaria by the Austrians, who occupied Milan on 28 April. On 26 April, the Empire appointed Annibale Sommariva as Imperial Commissioner of Lombardy, while many taxes were abolished or reduced by the Provisional Regency. Finally, on 25 May, the Supreme Imperial Commissioner Count Heinrich von Bellegarde took all the powers in Lombardy, and former monarchies in Modena, Romagna and Piedmont were gradually re-established; on 30 May, the Treaty of Paris was signed, and the remains of the kingdom were annexed by the Austrian Empire as the Kingdom of Lombardy–Venetia, which was announced by Count Bellegarde on 12 June.

== See also ==
- Coat of arms of Napoleonic Italy
- Emblem of Italy
- Flags of Napoleonic Italy
