= Palazzo Sannazzari =

Building in Milan, Italy

Giovanni Migliara, The looting of the residence of Giuseppe Prina in Piazza San Fedele (c. 1815), Palazzo Morando, Milan

The Palazzo Sannazzari (also spelled Sannazari or Sannazzaro) was an 18th-century neoclassical palace in Milan. Designed by Giuseppe Piermarini and located on Via Marino within the Porta Nuova district, the palace was ransacked and looted during the 1814 uprising, which saw the defenestration and subsequent lynching of Giuseppe Prina, the Minister of Finance of the Napoleonic Kingdom of Italy. It was later demolished, though not before some surviving frescoes by Andrea Appiani were detached and relocated to the Pinacoteca di Brera.

== History ==
Piazza San Fedele in the mid-1700s. Engraving by Marcantonio dal Re

Palazzo Sannazzari was built in 1776 on a site previously occupied by the residence of Count Antonio Greppi on the piazza facing the Jesuit Church of San Fedele. Greppi sold the premises after moving to the newly built Palazzo Greppi on Via Sant'Antonio in the Sestiere di Porta Romana.

The Palazzo was commissioned by the merchant and philanthropist Count Giacomo Sannazzari della Ripa (1755–1804). It featured opulent interiors and a hanging garden situated on a large terrace, as a traditional ground-level garden could not be accommodated within the building. Reportedly designed by Sannazzari himself, the terrace housed a large aviary, a greenhouse for citrus plants, a fountain, a grotto and a small, circular temple adorned with frescoes by Appiani. The palace housed a large art collection which included Raphael's Marriage of the Virgin, Marco d'Oggiono's Assumption, and Giovanni Ambrogio Figino's Portrait of a Warrior.

The interior was adorned with a fresco cycle by Appiani depicting the Stories of Apollo, dating from 1799. After the destruction of the palace in 1814, the frescoes were detached and some were transferred to the Pinacoteca di Brera, while others were sent to the Galleria d'Arte Moderna, Milan.

Following Count Sannazzaro's death in 1804, the collection was transferred to the Ospedale Maggiore, the universal heir to his estate. In 1807, Raphael's painting was purchased by Eugène de Beauharnais, and transferred to the Brera Academy.

After the Count's death in 1808, the palace remained vacant and passed into the hands of the State. During the French occupation, it became the residence of Giuseppe Prina, the Minister of Finance of the Kingdom of Italy. Prina was thrown from a window and murdered by an enraged mob on 20 April 1814. During the incident, the palace was ransacked and stripped of everything, including its iron window grilles, nails and even the gutters. In the aftermath, the Minister of the Interior under the new Austrian administration ordered the demolition of a large portion of the structure on 25 May 1814, as the building was beyond repair.

The surviving part of Palazzo Sannazzari was destroyed by Anglo-American bombing raids during the Second World War.
