= Coat of arms of Napoleonic Italy =

Coat of arms of the Kingdom of Italy

Versions
- Inescutcheon only variant
- Armiger: Napoleon I
- Shield: Tierced per pale: 1) per fess a) Gules on a gonfalone two keys per saltire all or (Parma-Farnese) and b) Azure an eagle displayed argent, wings inverted, crowned and armed or (Modena-Este); 2) Argent a serpent erect per vert, crowned or, swallowing a child gules (Lombardia); 3) per fess, a) Azure the lion of Saint-Mark or (Veneto) and b) Gules on a cross argent a label or and in base sinister a tower of the second (Bologna). Overall an escutcheon bearing: or a crown radiant vert, on a bordure gules 8 plates.

The coat of arms of Napoleonic Italy was the coat of arms used by the Kingdom of Italy (1805–1814) during the reign of Napoleon as King of Italy.

== Description ==
The arms displayed on the heraldic shield are tierced per pale (three vertical divisions of equal width):

- First pale: the upper portion shows a papal ombrellino with the keys of Saint Peter (for the Duchy of Parma), while the lower portion shows the white eagle of the House of Este (for the Duchy of Modena).
- Second pale: a silver pale charged with the blue Milanese serpent of the House of Visconti (for the Duchy of Milan).
- Third pale: the upper portion shows the lion of Saint Mark with a red cap on its head (for Veneto), while the lower portion shows the altered arms of Bologna, charged with a silver tower (for Rovigo and Feltre).
- Inescutcheon: the heraldic shield is charged with a gold inescutcheon displaying an iron crown with six points (representing the Iron Crown of Lombardy) inside a red border with eight silver rings (for Lombardy).

The heraldic shield is encircled by the gold collar of the Légion d'honneur and superimposed on a Napoleonic eagle wielding a thunderbolt. Above the imperial eagle rises a Napoleonic star. The eagle is surrounded by a green mantle that is lined with ermine and surmounted by a royal crown in gold.

A more complete heraldic description (blazon) of the arms of the Kingdom of Italy is as follows.

Tierced per pale:

- (1) per fess (a) Gules on an umbraculum two keys per saltire all Or and (b) Azure an eagle displayed Argent, wings inverted, crowned and armed Or;
- (2) Argent a serpent erect per Azure, crowned Or, in its mouth a figure Gules;
- (3) per fess (a) Azure a lion of Saint Mark Or wearing a cap Gules and (b) Gules on a cross Argent a label Azure and in base sinister a tower Argent.

Overall an inescutcheon bearing: Or an iron crown radiant, on a bordure Gules eight plates Argent. The shield encircled by the collar of the Légion d'honneur on the breast of an imperial eagle Or, within a mantle Vert lined Ermine, crowned by a royal crown Or.

This coat of arms can be seen on the coins minted in the kingdom, as shown below.

== Gallery ==
Emblem of the Italian Republic (1802–1805)

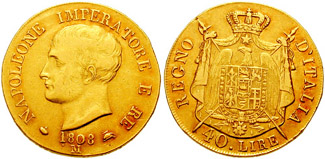
40 lire coin from 1808

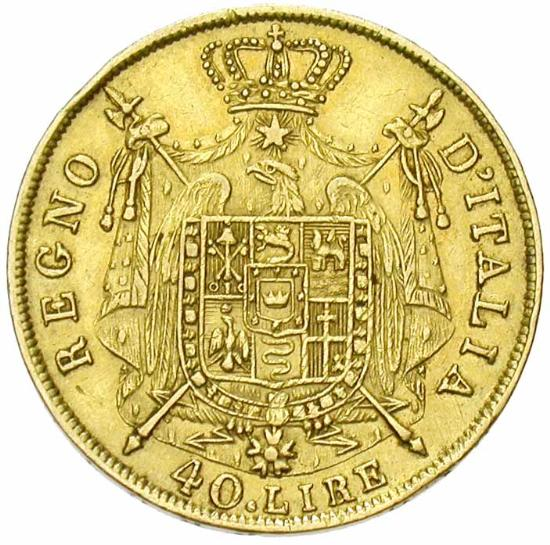
40 lire coin from 1812

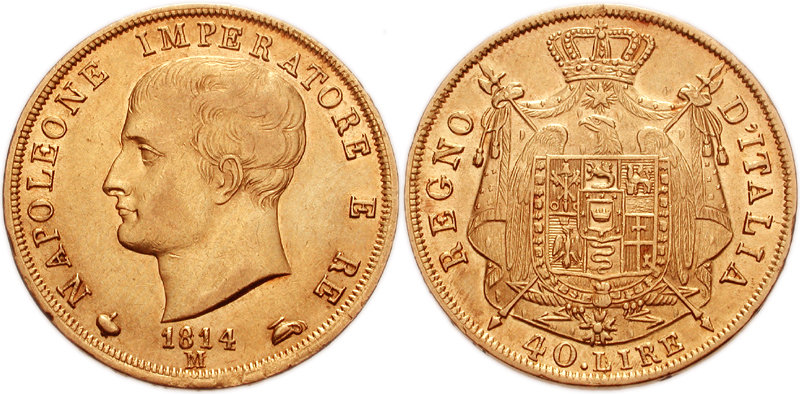
40 lire coin from 1814

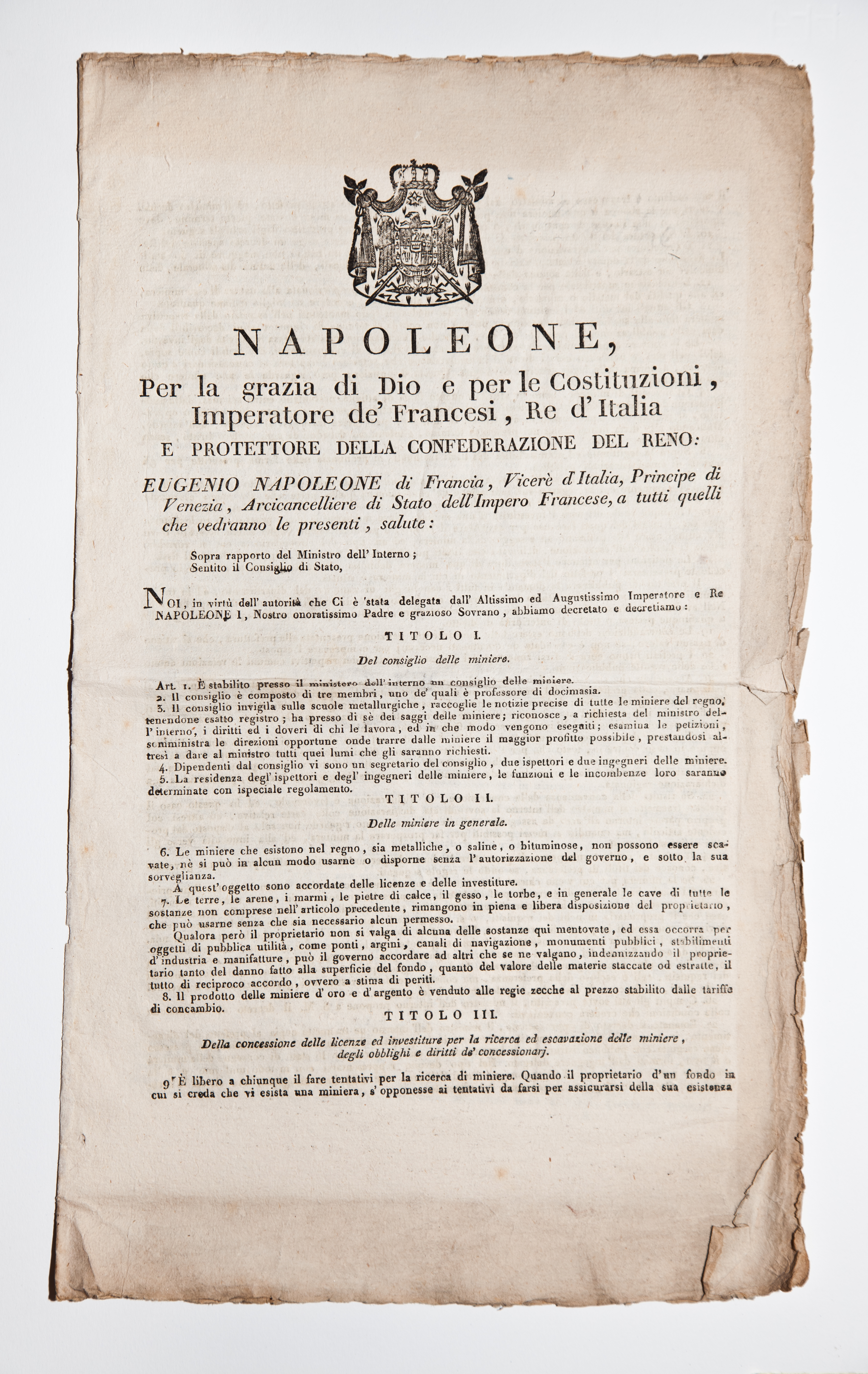
Document from 1808

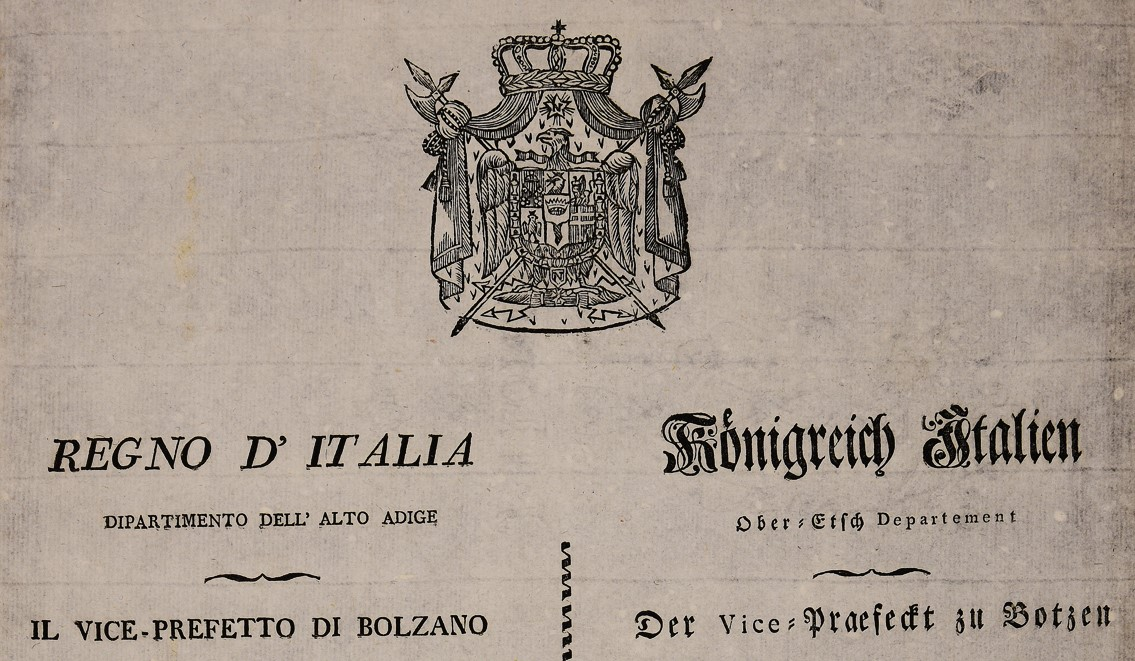
Document from 1810

== See also ==
- Emblem of Italy
- Flags of Napoleonic Italy
- Kingdom of Italy (Napoleonic)
