= Giovanni Bovara =

Italian priest and politician (1734–1812)

Giovanni Bovara Rejna (30 September 1734, Malgrate, not far from Como - 12 October 1812, Milan) was an Italian priest and politician.

== Life ==
=== Early years ===
The second son of Cristoforo Bovara Rejna and Teodora Brentano Riati, Bovara's family had become rich through the silk-trade and silk-production since the early years of the 18th century. This gave Bovara an easy start to his ecclesiastical career, studying in the Milan seminary and ordained priest in Milan Cathedral in 1758. He then joined the congregation of Oblates. He was interested in contemporary literary and cultural life in Milan and entered the Accademia dei Trasformati, excelled in Latin poetry and entered padre Branda's polemics alongside other writers such as Giuseppe Parini.

=== Educational reformer ===
He was appointed professor of Canonical Institutions at the University of Pavia in 1769, not only due to his own merits but also since he was a strong supporter of state policy in general and of the relationship between the church and state power in particular. In 1772 the Austrian authorities chose him as 'Secretary of Government' (i.e. Minister) for the Duchy of Milan and moved him to a teaching post in Milan's 'Scuole palatine' (Palatine Schools).

During these years Bovara began working on education reforms, visiting several schools, colleges, libraries and cultural institutions in Austrian Lombardy between 1771 and 1775. He then experimented with a model for schools in the provinces of Cremona, Lodi and Casalmaggiore, hoping it should be applied to the whole state. He was the first reformer in Italy to realise the need to create three types of schools - primary (where children were taught reading, writing and arithmetic), Italian and Latin grammar schools (to prepare pupils for high school) and craft schools (teaching subjects such as ornamental design, arithmetic and being a merchant). The then-dominant Josephinism looked favourably on Bovara's work and agreed to ask the bishops of the dioceses affected by the reforms to suppress local fraternities considered as redundant to the community's needs. However, Bovara was unable to set up this arrangement in Milan itself due to strong opposition from the archbishop, who only gave into his three-streams school model in 1786.

Bovara also reformed teaching in high schools and colleges, with teaching by laypeople not priests, introducing arithmetic, history, geometry, geography, physics and natural history as subjects, improving knowledge of Italian and having philosophy taught in Italian not Latin. He led the Austrian authorities' biggest seizure from the Jesuits in Brera, proposing that their schools be replaced by a new academy of sciences and the arts. He also proposed reforms in Mantua from 1777 onwards.

He continued to be actively engaged in politics, looking at marriage as many began to argue that the state had jurisdiction in civil marriages and at the diocese's boundaries, especially Joseph II's negotiations with the Republic of Venice (arguing Rome should be kept out of the negotiations). His links with the Austrian state became even closer during this period, as Bovara's brother became business partner with the wealthy Milanese merchant and banker Antonio Greppi. Building on Bovara's foundations, when Wenzel Anton von Kaunitz-Rietberg had to demonstrate the Empire's power over Rome in Milan's ecclesiastical affairs in 1782, he appointed Bovara as abbot of San Giovanni Evangelista in Appiano Gentile, an area where other members of his family would also buy large amounts of land and property.

After a period of experimentation, in 1786 the Austrian government appointed an ecclesiastical commission, including Bovara, who took charge of reforming the universities, gymnasiums, book censorship, nuns, policing the secular clergy, the churches in the diocese and in Como and the academies of Milan and Mantua. In 1788 he abolished a number of parishes in Como which had been criticised for their economic and spiritual failings. He reformed the study programmes at the University of Pavia on the Viennese model, setting up a chair for the study of theological sources in addition to ones in patristics and the history of theology, strongly suggesting the study of Jansenist and Gallican authors who would in his view strengthen the state's role in the new students' mindset.

=== Kingdom of Italy ===
From 1796 to 1802, Bovara led a life distant from the heart of government due to the French occupation of Lombardy, since he was seen as an awkward reminder of the former Austrian government. When Francesco Melzi d'Eril became vice-president of the Italian Republic, he inherited the existing problems of the relationship between church and state and so considered recalling Bovara, asking Napoleon I to nominate him as Minister of Religion. Bovara's first suggested reforms proposed cancelling the popular vote for selection of parish priests and giving bishops back their right to choose them, taking into account that bishops had now been turned into government officials by Napoleon.

Bovara tried to revive and move forward the reforms already underway under Joseph II, but found himself again hindered by financial difficulties. He also had little influence and much opposition, since after the constitution of the Kingdom of Italy many critics resented his return to political power and suspected him of being pro-Austrian. Even so, Bovara proved a good official and so was summoned to Paris in 1811 to join the national council of bishops and archbishops of the French territories and of the Italian and French Ministers of Religion which Napoleon had summoned. Soon afterwards he returned to Italy, where he fell seriously ill and died.

== Bibliography ==
- A. Pingaud, Les hommes d'état de la Rèpublique italienne, Parigi 1914
- E. Chinea, Dalle antiche botteghe d'arti e mestieri alle prime scuole industriali in Lombardia, Milano 1933
- C. A. Vianello, La giovinezza di Parini, Verri e Beccaria, Milano 1933
- E. Chinea, La riforma scolastica negli stati della Lombardia austriaca. Studi preliminari alla riforma della scuola media, Milano e Genova, Napoli 1935
- C. Castiglioni, Napoleone e la Chiesa milanese, Milano 1935
- C. A. Vianello, La legislazione matrimoniale in Lombardia da Giuseppe II a Napoleone, Milano 1938
