= Emblem of Italy =

Emblem of the Italian Republic

Versions
- Golden version, used on the presidential standard
- Armiger: Italian Republic (colored); Sergio Mattarella, President of the Italian Republic (golden)
- Adopted: 5 May 1948
- Crest: None
- Shield: Upon a cogwheel proper, the Stella d'Italia ('Star of Italy')
- Supporters: Olive and oak
- Motto: REPVBBLICA ITALIANA (Note: Repubblica Italiana is Italian for 'Italian Republic', with the letter U – absent from the classical Latin alphabet – replaced with a V, as is common in inscriptions and heraldry.)

The emblem of the Italian Republic (Italian: emblema della Repubblica Italiana) was formally adopted by the newly formed Italian Republic on 5 May 1948. Although often referred to as a coat of arms (or stemma in Italian), it is an emblem as it was not designed to conform to traditional heraldic rules. The emblem is used extensively by the Italian government.

The emblem, shaped as a Roman wreath, comprises a white five-pointed star, the Stella d'Italia (English: 'Star of Italy'), which is the oldest national symbol of Italy, since it dates back to the Graeco-Roman tradition, with a thin red border, superimposed upon a five-spoked cogwheel, standing between an olive branch to the left and an oak branch to the right; the branches are in turn bound together by a red ribbon with the inscription "REPVBBLICA ITALIANA" in Roman square capitals.

The armorial bearings of the House of Savoy, blazoned gules a cross argent, were previously in use by the former Kingdom of Italy; the supporters, on either side a lion rampant Or, were replaced with fasci littori (lit. 'bundles of the lictors') during the fascist era.

== Description ==
Emblem of the Italian Republic rendered in black and white

State ensign of the Italian Republic (since 2003)

The central element of the emblem is a five-pointed white star, also called the Stella d'Italia (English: 'Star of Italy'), which is the oldest national symbol of Italy, dating back to ancient Greece. In that epoch Italy was associated with the Star of Venus because it is west of the Greek peninsula. Immediately after sunset, Venus is sometimes visible on the horizon towards the west. It has been a traditional symbol of Italy since the Risorgimento, and is also associated with the traditional iconography of a woman wearing a turreted crown – the allegory of Italia turrita – and dominated by a bright star, the Star of Italy.

The star marked the first award of post-war reconstruction, the Order of the Star of Italian Solidarity, and still indicates membership in the Armed Forces today.

On the republican emblem, the Star of Italy is superimposed on a grey cogwheel, representing labour, which is the foundation of the Republic. Article 1 of the Italian Constitution reads:

Italy is a democratic republic, built on labour. Sovereignty belongs to the people, who exercise it in the forms and within the limits of the Constitution [...]

— Article 1

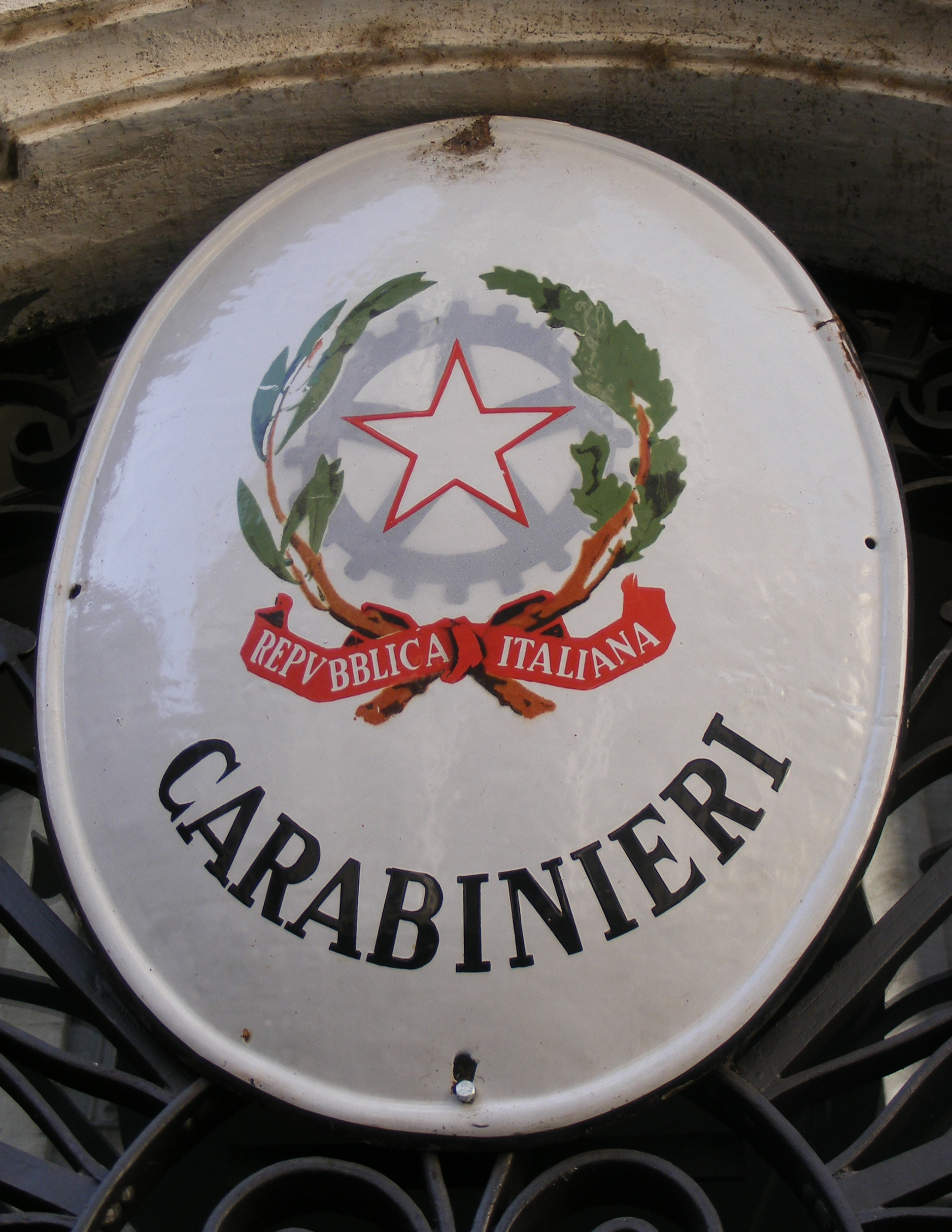
Institutional symbol of the Carabinieri, present at the entrance of all the barracks

The reference to labour is not to be understood as a legal rule, but rather as a principle, which recognizes it as the foundation of Italian society. The second paragraph assigns sovereignty exclusively to the people, and establishes the democratic character of the republic. The cogwheel is also present on the flag and emblem of Angola and on the emblem of Mozambique, nations founded through the decolonization of the Portuguese Empire as well as on the coats of arms of the Italian municipalities of Assago, Cafasse and Chiesina Uzzanese.

The cogwheel and star are enclosed by an oak branch on the right, which symbolizes the strength and dignity of the Italians (in Latin the term robur means both 'oak' and 'moral and physical strength'), and by an olive branch on the left, which represents Italy's will for peace, both internally and with other nations. Both oak and olive trees are characteristic of the Italian landscape. The green branches are in turn bound together by a red ribbon bearing the inscription "REPVBBLICA ITALIANA" in white capital letters. As regards Italy's desire for peace, Article 11 of the Constitution states:

Italy rejects war as an instrument of offense against the freedom of other peoples and as a means of resolving international disputes; allows equal conditions with other states to the limitations of sovereignty necessary for an order that ensures peace and justice between nations; promotes and favors international organizations aimed at this purpose [...]

— Article 11

The refusal of war as an instrument of offense does not signify that Italy cannot participate in a conflict, instead that articles 78 and 87 of the Constitution prescribe which state organs decide the state of war. In particular for Italy, it is the two chambers that decree the state of war, which is then formally declared by the President of the Republic; the chambers then give the Italian government the necessary powers to face the conflict. Another extraordinary provision in case of war is the duration of the legislature of the two chambers, which can be exceptionally extended, as stated in article 60 of the Constitution, beyond the five canonical years.

The emblem of the Italian Republic is not defined as a coat of arms as it has no shield; the latter being, according to the rules of heraldry, an essential part of such devices (as opposed to other decorations such as crowns, helmets, or fronds, which are accessory parts). For this reason, it is more accurate to refer to it as a national emblem.

== Armed forces ==
Coat of arms of the Italian Navy, used on ensign

The Italian naval ensign, since 1947, comprises the national flag defaced with the arms of the Italian Navy: The shield is quartered, symbolic of the four repubbliche marinare, or thalassocracies, of Italy: Venice (represented by the lion passant, top left), Genoa (top right), Amalfi (bottom left), and Pisa, represented by their respective crosses. The Marina Mercantile (and private citizens at sea) use the civil ensign, differentiated by the absence of the mural crown and the presence of a lion holding open the gospel, bearing the inscription PAX TIBI MARCE EVANGELISTA MEVS (lit. 'Peace to you, Mark, my evangelist') instead of a sword.

To acknowledge the Navy's origins in ancient Rome, the rostrata crown, an "emblem of honor and of value that the Roman Senate conferred on duci of shipping companies, conquerors of lands and cities overseas," was proposed by Admiral Domenico Cavagnari in 1939. An inescutcheon, bearing the Savoy shield flanked by fasces, was removed before the arms were first employed.

The Italian Army, Air Force and Carabinieri also have their own coats of arms, as do each of the municipalities, provinces and regions of Italy.

== History ==
=== Kingdom of Italy (Napoleonic) ===
The Kingdom of Italy was a French client state founded in Northern Italy by Napoleon, Emperor of the French in 1805. It had a peculiar coat of arms, formed by the arms of the House of Bonaparte augmented by charges from various Italian regions. When Napoleon abdicated the thrones of France and Italy in 1814, the former monarchies were gradually re-established and following the Treaty of Paris in 1815, the rump kingdom was annexed by the Austrian Empire.

=== Kingdom of Italy ===
Between 1848 and 1861, a sequence of events led to the independence and unification of Italy (except for Venetia, Rome, Trento and Trieste, or Italia irredenta, which were united with the rest of Italy in 1866, 1870 and 1918 respectively); this period of Italian history is known as the Risorgimento, or resurgence. During this period, the green, white and red tricolore became the symbol which united all the efforts of the Italian people towards freedom and independence.

The Italian tricolour, defaced with the coat of arms of the House of Savoy, was first adopted as a war flag by the Regno di Sardegna-Piemonte (Kingdom of Sardinia-Piedmont) army in 1848. In his Proclamation to the Lombard-Venetian people, Charles Albert said "… in order to show more clearly with exterior signs the commitment to Italian unification, We want that Our troops … have the Savoy shield placed on the Italian tricolour flag." As the arms mixed with the white of the flag, it was fimbriated azure, blue being the dynastic colour. On 15 April 1861, when the Regno delle Due Sicilie (Kingdom of the Two Sicilies) was incorporated into the Regno d'Italia, after defeat in the Expedition of the Thousand led by Giuseppe Garibaldi, this flag and the armorial bearings of Sardinia were declared the symbols of the newly formed kingdom.

On 4 May 1870, nine years later, the Consulta Araldica issued a decree on the arms, as with the Sardinian arms, two lions rampant in gold supporting the shield, bearing instead only the Savoy cross (as on the flag) now representing all Italy, with a crowned helmet, around which, the collars of the Military Order of Savoy, the Civil Order of Savoy, the Order of the Crown of Italy (established 2 February 1868), the Order of Saints Maurice and Lazarus, and the Supreme Order of the Most Holy Annunciation (bearing the motto FERT) were suspended. The lions held lances flying the national flag. From the helmet fell a royal mantle, engulfed by a pavilion under the Stella d'Italia, purported to protect the nation.

After twenty years, on 1 January 1890, the arms' exterior were slightly modified more in keeping with those of Sardinia. The fur mantling and lances disappeared and the crown was taken from the helmet to the pavilion, now sewn with crosses and roses. The Iron Crown of Lombardy was placed on the helmet, under the traditional Savoyan crest (a winged lionhead), which, together with the banner of Savoy from the former Sardinian arms, replaced the star of Italy. These arms remained in official use for 56 years until the birth of the Italian Republic, and continued as the dynastic arms of the head of the House of Savoy.

On 11 April 1929, the Savoy lions were replaced by Benito Mussolini with fasces from the National Fascist Party shield, which had been previously depicted accollé. After his dismissal and arrest on 25 July 1943 however, the earlier version was briefly restored until the emblem of the new Repubblica Italiana was adopted, after the institutional referendum on the form of the state, held on 2 June 1946. This is celebrated in Italy as Festa della Repubblica.

=== Italian Social Republic ===
The arms of the short-lived Nazi puppet state in northern Italy, the Repubblica Sociale Italiana (Italian Social Republic), or Republic of Salò as it was commonly known, was that of the governing Republican Fascist Party, a silver eagle clutching a banner of the tricolore inverted on a shield charged with fasces. Italian fascism derived its name from the fasces, which symbolises authority and "strength through unity". The fasces has been used to show the imperium (power) of the Roman Empire, and was thus considered an appropriate heraldic symbol. Additionally, Roman legions had carried the aquila, or eagle, as signa militaria (military standards).

This shield had previously been displayed alongside the royal arms from 1927 to 1929, when the latter was modified to incorporate elements of both.

On 25 April 1945, commemorated as Festa della Liberazione, the government of Mussolini fell. The separate Italian Social Republic had existed for slightly more than one and a half years.

=== Italian Republic ===
The decision to provide the new Italian Republic with an emblem was taken by the government of Alcide De Gasperi in October 1946. The design was chosen by public competition, with the requirement that political party emblems were forbidden and the inclusion of the Stellone d'Italia (English: 'Great Star of Italy'), "inspired by a sense of the earth and municipalities." The five winners were assigned further requirements for the design of the emblem, "a ring that has a tower-shaped crown," surrounded by a garland of Italian foliage and flora.

Below a representation of the sea, and above, the gold star, with the legend Unità e Libertà or Unity and Liberty in Italian. The winner was Paolo Paschetto, Professor of the Institute of Fine Arts in Rome from 1914 to 1948, and the design was presented in February 1947, together with the other finalists, in an exhibition in Via Margutta. This version, however, did not meet with public approval, so a new competition was held, again won by Paolo Paschetto. The new emblem was approved by the Constituent Assembly in February 1948, and officially adopted by the President of the Italian Republic, Enrico De Nicola, in May 1948.

Coat of arms of Napoleonic Italy (1805–1814)

Coat of arms of the Kingdom of Sardinia from 1848, and first coat of arms of the Kingdom of Italy until 1870

Greater coat of arms of the Kingdom of Italy (1870–1890)

Full achievement of the coat of arms (1890–1927; 1944–1946)

Greater coat of arms of the Kingdom of Italy flanked by the tricolour coat of arms with the fasces (1927–1929)

Greater coat of arms with fasces inserted inside as supporters (1929–1944)

Coat of arms of the Italian Social Republic (1943–1945)

== Trivia ==
On 8 August 2026, the Ministry of Foreign Affairs' social media accounts published a statement regarding the Sánchez government's decision to impose border controls in retaliation against Italy; however, the official emblem of Italy was AI-generated, resulting in an error in the text "Repubblica Italiana," which appeared as "Repubblica Fealiana." The ministry subsequently deleted and reposted the statement with the corrected image.

== Gallery ==
Seal of State

Emblem rendered in black and white (with striped backgrounds)

Presidential standard of Italy (since 2000)

Standard of the acting president of Italy (since 1986)

Standard of the President of the Council of Ministers of the Italian Republic (since 2008)

Standard of the civil authorities

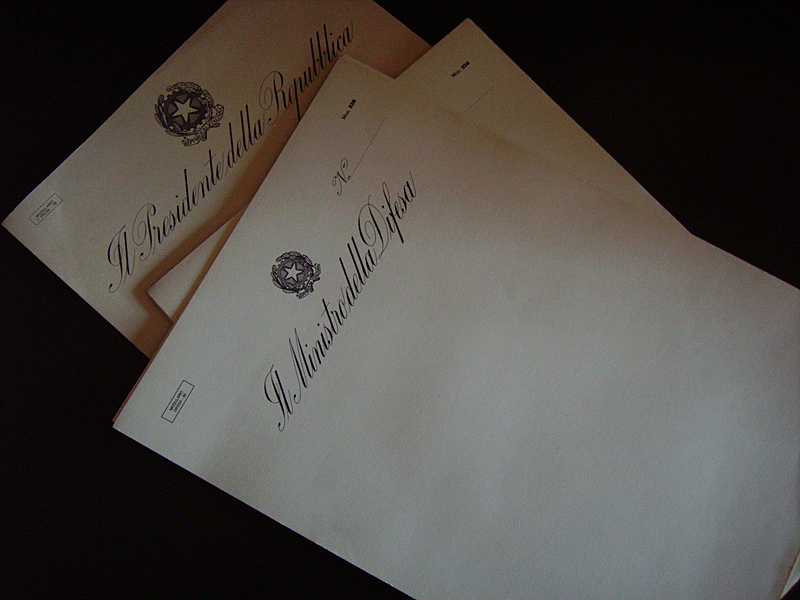
Emblem on government letterhead

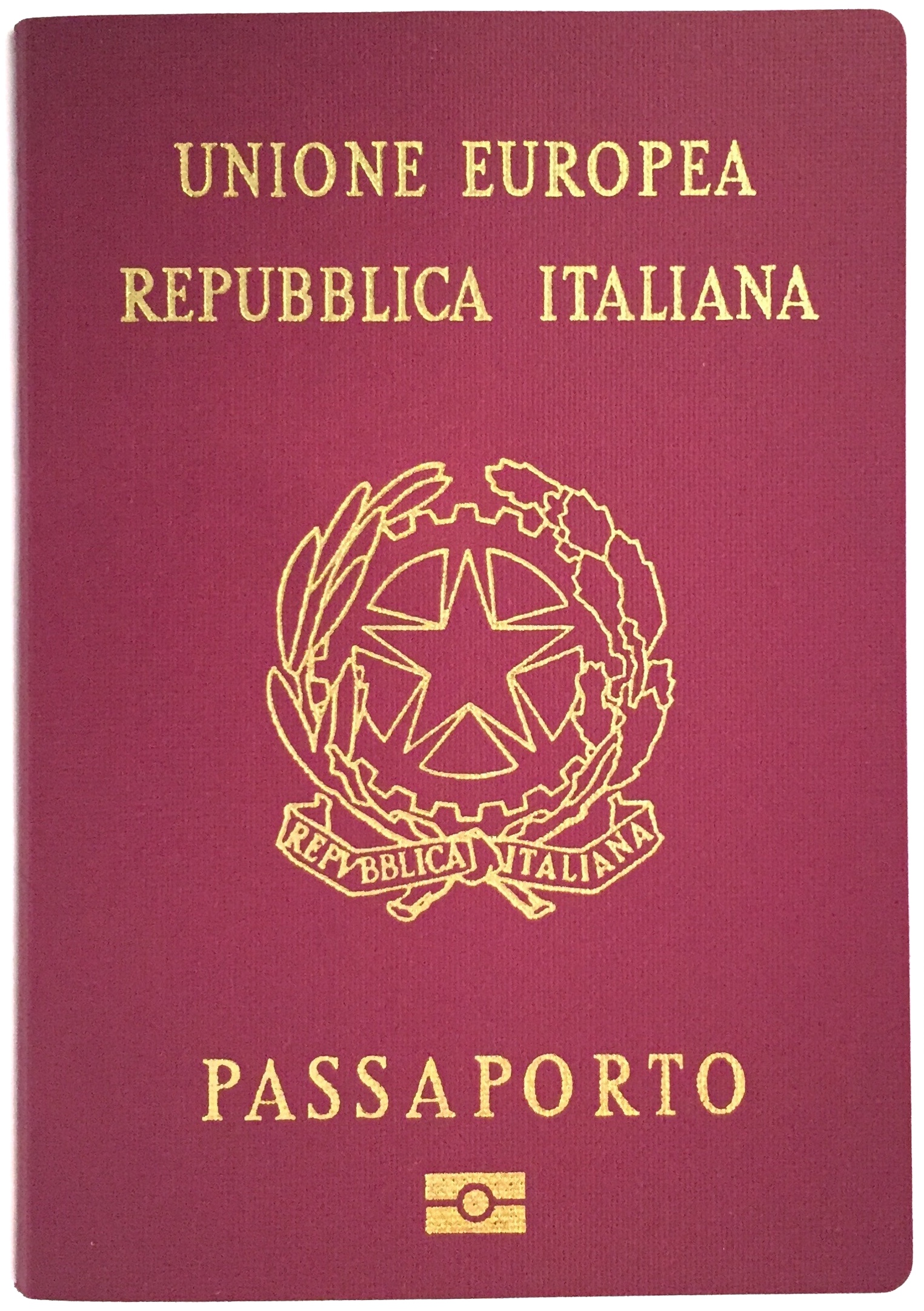
Emblem on an Italian passport

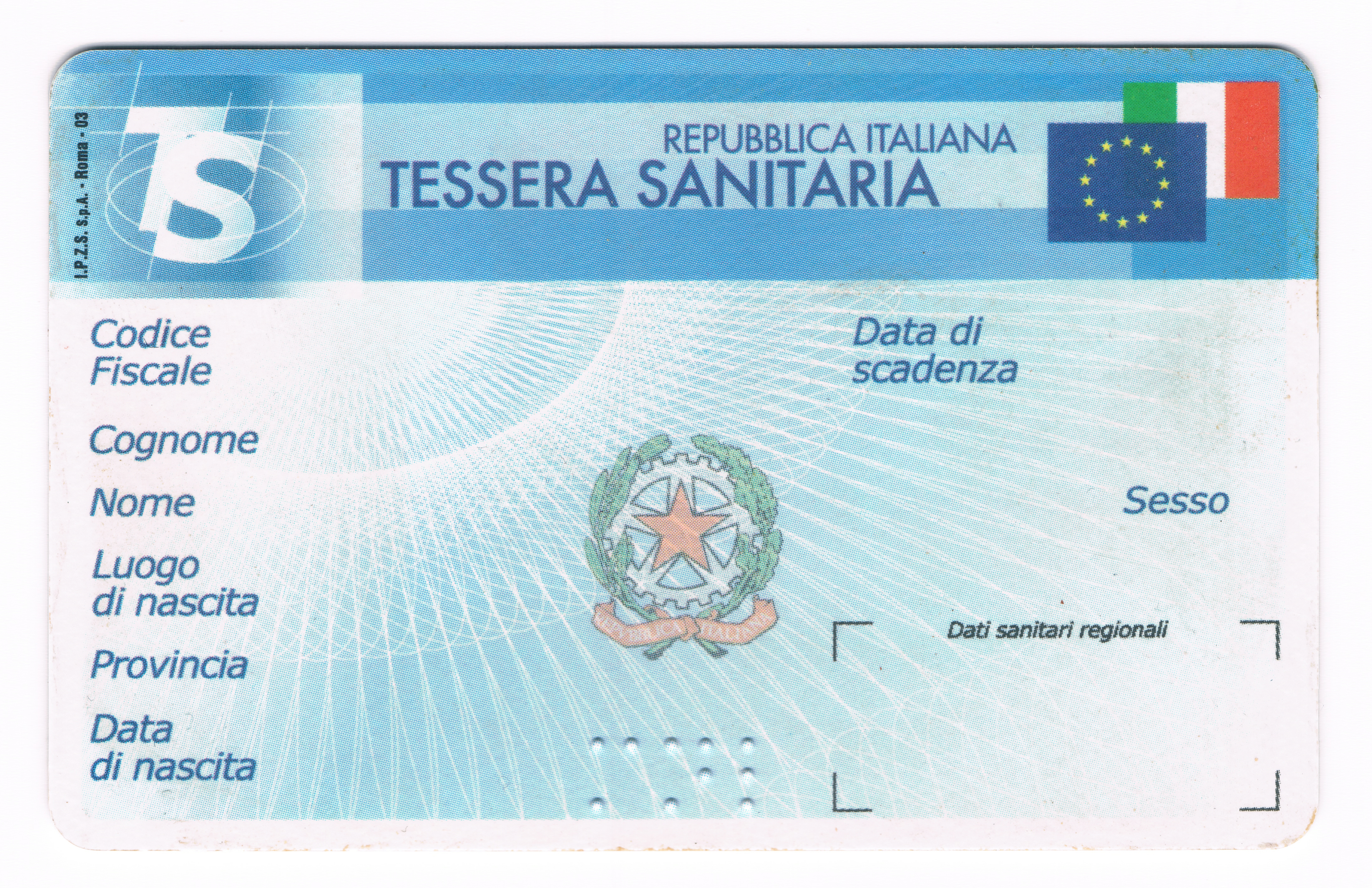
European Health Insurance Card issued in Italy showing the emblem

== See also ==
- Armorial of Italy
- Coat of arms of Napoleonic Italy
- Il Canto degli Italiani
- National symbols of Italy
- Stella d'Italia
