= Italian Republic (Napoleonic) =

French client state in northern Italy (1802–05)

Coordinates: 45°28′N 9°10′E

Italian Republic Repubblica Italiana (Italian)
- 1802–1805
- Flag Emblem

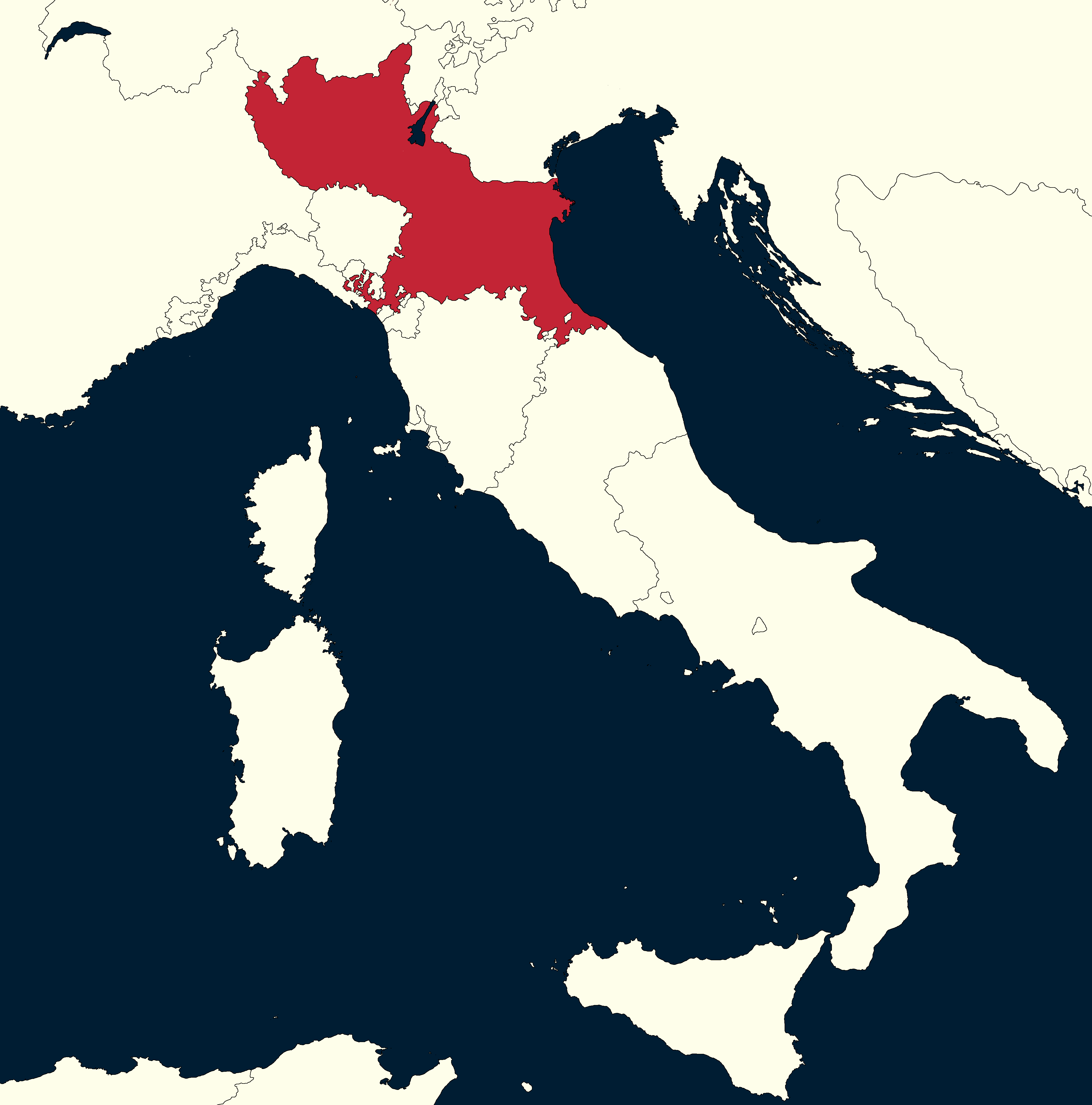
- The Republic of Italy in 1803
- Status: Sister republic of France
- Capital: Milan
- Common languages: Lombard, Emilian-Romagnol and Italian
- Religion: Catholic Church
- Demonym: Italian
- Government: Presidential republic
- President
  - 1802–1805: Napoleon Bonaparte
- Vice President
  - 1802–1805: Francesco Melzi d'Eril
- Legislature: Legislative Body
- Historical era: Napoleonic Wars
  - Treaty of Lunéville: 9 February 1801
  - National Meetings in Lyon: 26 January 1802
  - Monarchy proclaimed: 17 March 1805
- Currency: Milanese scudo, lira, soldo and denaro
| Preceded by | Succeeded by |
| Cisalpine Republic; Subalpine Republic | Kingdom of Italy |

The Italian Republic (Italian: Repubblica Italiana) was a short-lived (1802–1805) republic located in Northern Italy. Napoleon Bonaparte served as president and its capital was Milan.

== The Republic ==
The Consulta of the République cisalpine receives the First Consul, 26 January 1802, Nicolas-André Monsiau, 1806–08

The Italian Republic was the successor of the Cisalpine Republic, which changed its constitution to allow the French First Consul Napoleon to become its president. The new constitution changed the name of the state to the "Italian Republic"; it consisted of the same areas that had comprised the Cisalpine Republic, primarily Lombardy and Romagna.

The republic had a territory of more than 42,500 square kilometers (16,400 sq mi), and a population of 3,840,000 in 12 départements. Milan was the capital city, the main center having 124,000 inhabitants in 1764. The country was prosperous despite the plundering experienced in preceding centuries. Its economy was based on cereal agriculture and cattle raising, plus flourishing small industries, notably the production of silk.

The flag of the Italian Republic maintained the three Italian-Milanese national colours, but with a new, less revolutionary, pattern. The coat of arms was specified in a decree on 13 May 1802. A treaty of friendship and commerce with the Republic of San Marino was signed on 10 June 1802, and a Concordat with the Holy See on 16 September 1803.

The government created the National Guard of Italy, a National Gendarmerie, and a finance police; the metric system was introduced and a national currency was planned, although never minted during the Republican era.

In 1805, following Bonaparte's assumption of the title of Emperor of the French, the Italian Republic was transformed into the Kingdom of Italy (Regno d'Italia), with Napoleon as king and his stepson Eugène de Beauharnais as viceroy.

== Institutional form ==
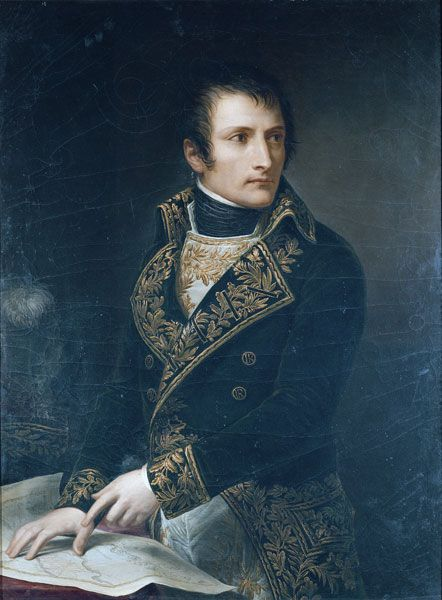
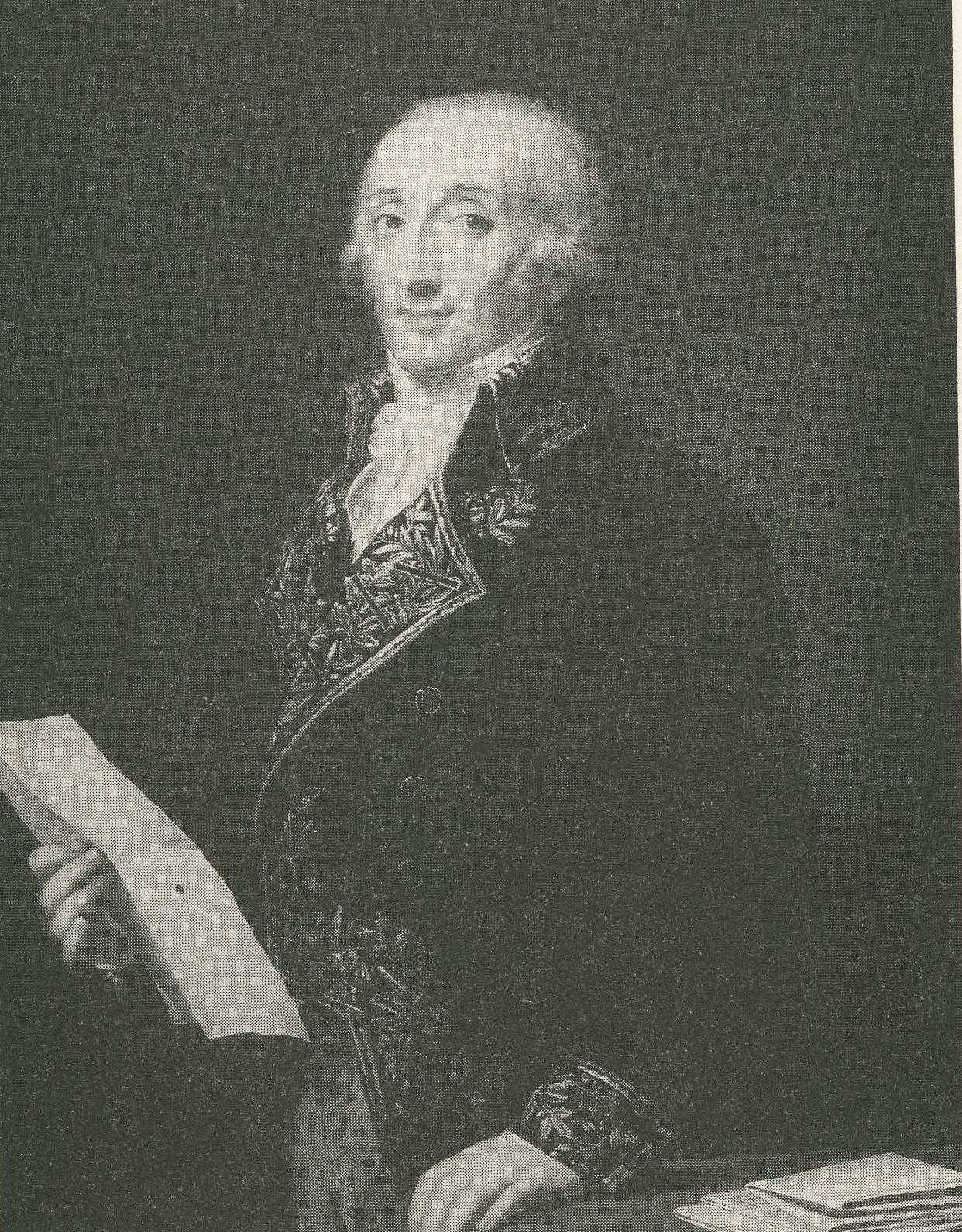
Portraits of Napoleone Bonaparte and Francesco Melzi as president and vice president of the Italian Republic, respectively, by Andrea Appiani (1803)

According to the Italian constitution of 1802, sovereignty resided in three electoral colleges of three to two hundred members: the College of Owners (il Collegio dei possidenti), the College of Scholars (il Collegio dei dotti), and the College of Traders (il Collegio dei mercanti), the first having its seat in Milan, the second in Bologna, and the third in Brescia. All the colleges elected a commission of control and supreme rule, called the Censorship (la Censura), composed of twenty-one members and based in Cremona.

The head of state was the president of the republic (il Presidente della repubblica), Napoleon Bonaparte, elected for 10 years. The president had full executive powers, appointed the vice-president (il Vicepresidente) and the secretary of state, took legislative and diplomatic initiative, chose the ministers, public agents, ambassadors, and chiefs of the army, summoned the executive councils, and prepared the budget. The vice-president, Francesco Melzi d'Eril, acted for the president during his absence. Melzi was described as a gentleman and effectively ruled over the state's domestic affairs during the three years of the republic's life. Never submitting to Napoleon, Melzi was demoted after the monarchy's proclamation in favour of more controllable men; however, Melzi's character ensured him Napoleon's deep private respect during all the years of the French empire. Melzi also introduced obligatory conscription to Italy.

The Consulta (la Consulta di Stato) was a commission of eight members led by the official president of the republic and in charge of foreign policy. The commissioners were appointed by the Censorship upon nomination by the three colleges: many former members of the Directory of the Cisalpine Republic entered into office. The Consulta ratified treaties, approved any special decrees concerning state security, and in the event of the death or resignation of the president, appointed the successor. The minister of foreign affairs was chosen from among the commissioners.

The Legislative Council (il Consiglio legislativo) was a commission of at least ten members appointed by the president for three years. Its mission was to allow the president to submit legislation, helping him in the elaboration of laws and being present when they were discussed in parliament. The secretary of state (il segretario di Stato) was the chief of the public administration. He promulgated the laws, guarded the state's seal, and countersigned presidential acts. The first secretary was Diego Guicciardi, soon followed by Pellegrino Nobili and, finally, by Luigi Vaccari.

The government comprised seven ministers (i ministri). The Minister of War was at first Alessandro Trivulzi and then, from 1804, General Domenico Pino; Minister of Interior was at first Luigi Villa and then, from 1803, Daniele Felici; Minister of Foreign Affairs was Ferdinando Marescalchi; Minister of Justice and Great Judge was Bonaventura Spannocchi; Minister of Treasury was Antonio Veneri; Minister of Finance was Giuseppe Prina; Minister of Religion was Giovanni Bovara. To draw up its budgets, the government was assisted by a Commissionership for National Accountancy.

The parliament of the republic was the Legislative Body (il Corpo Legislativo) with limited powers. It was composed of 75 members elected in each department by the three colleges. It was summoned by the president of the republic and could only approve or reject a law, the discussion being reserved to a more restricted Chamber of orators or Chamber of speakers (Camera degli oratori, a committee of fifteen speakers). First appointed at the Meetings of Lyon, one-third of the parliament had to be renewed every two years.

The tribunals were divided into tribunals of first instance (tribunali di prima istanza), courts of appeal (corti d'appello), courts of revision (corti di revisione), and a court of cassation (corte di cassazione). The judges of the first two were appointed by the Consulta, the latter two by the three colleges.

== Local administration ==
Following the French system, the state was divided into 12 départements (dipartimenti). The chief of the department was the prefect (prefetto), an office created on 6 May 1802. The prefect was the state's representative in each province (dipartimento), and had two main functions: the first was to implement the administrative decisions of the central government and to control the local authorities, the second was leadership of the police. The local legislative body was the General Council (Consiglio generale), composed of representatives of the communes. The government appointed the Central Departmental Administration (Consiglio della prefettura), composed of five or seven members chosen from nominations submitted by the General Council: the Administrations had powers over taxes and public works and, generally, represented local interests.

The departments were divided into districts (distretti) equivalent to the French arrondissements. The chief of the district was the vice-prefect, which had powers similar to those of the prefect, but for a smaller area. However, the structure of the districts was not uniform over all the territory of the republic, and some districts were administered by a district council and a chancellor.

The districts were divided into communes. Communes with more than 3,000 inhabitants had a city council (consiglio comunale) of thirty or forty members, chosen by the General council from nominations submitted by the same city council. In the smaller communes, all the taxable citizens were councillors. The council elected an executive municipality of three to nine members, helped in its executive functions by a city secretary. All city offices were held only by owners and traders, and the leadership of the owners was assured. Each commune had a tax collector.

=== List of departments and districts ===
- Agogna (capital Novara)
  - District of Novara, District of Vigevano, District of Domodossola, District of Varallo, District of Arona
- Crostolo (capital Reggio Emilia)
- Lario (capital Como)
  - District of Como, District of Varese, District of Sondrio, District of Lecco
- Lower Po (capital Ferrara)
- Mella (capital Brescia)
  - District of Brescia, District of Chiari, District of Verolanuova, District of Salò
- Mincio (capital Mantua)
  - District of Mantua, District of Revere, District of Verona, District of Castiglione
- Olona (capital Milan)
  - District of Milan, District of Pavia, District of Monza, District of Gallarate
- Panaro (capital Modena)
- Reno (capital Bologna)
- Rubicone (capital Forlì)
- Serio (capital Bergamo)
  - District of Bergamo, District of Clusone, District of Treviglio, District of Breno
- Upper Po (capital Cremona)
  - District of Cremona, District of Crema, District of Lodi, District of Casalmaggiore

== See also ==
- French client republic
- Cisalpine Republic

== Sources ==
● Historical database of Lombard laws (it.)
● Text of the Constitution of Italy of 1802 (it.)
