= District of Monza =

Former division of the Napoleonic Italian Republic

The District of Monza was one of the four divisions of the Department of Olona, the province of Milan during the Napoleonic Italian Republic. It received the numeral III and its capital was Monza.

== The district ==
Founded on May 13, 1801, it had a population of 78,201 inhabitants. It was composed by the communes of Monza with part of:

- Brugherio
- Sant’Ambrogio e Cassina della Santa
- Agliate
- Agrate
- Aicurzio
- Albiate
- Albignano
- Arcore
- Basiano
- Belinzago
- Bellusco
- Bernareggio
- Bernate
- Biassono
- Bisentrate
- Bornago
- Burago
- Busnago
- Bussero
- Calò
- Cambiago
- Camparada
- Camporicco
- Canonica al Lambro
- Caponago
- Carate
- Carnate
- Carugate
- Casate nuovo
- Cassano sull’Adda
- Cassina Baraggia
- Cassina de’ Bracchi
- Cassina de’ Pecchi
- Cassine San Pietro
- Cavenago
- Cernusco Asinario
- Cernusco Lombardone
- Colnago
- Concesa
- Concorezzo
- Contra
- Corezzana
- Cornate
- Costa
- Gessate
- Gorgonzola
- Grezzago
- Gropello
- Incugnate
- Inzago
- Lesmo
- Lissone
- Lomagna
- Lomaniga
- Maresso
- Masate
- Melzo
- Merate
- Mezzago
- Moncucco
- Monte
- Montevecchia
- Novate
- Omate
- Oreno
- Ornago
- Osnago
- Paderno
- Paina
- Pessano
- Porto
- Pozzo
- Pozzuolo
- Robiate
- Roncello
- Ronco
- Ruginello
- San Damiano
- Sant’Agata
- Seregno
- Sovico
- Sulbiate inferiore
- Sulbiate superiore
- Trecella
- Tregasio
- Trezzano
- Trezzo
- Usmate
- Vaprio
- Vedano
- Velate
- Verderio inferiore
- Verderio superiore
- Vergo
- Villanuova
- Vimercate

== Sources ==
- Historical database of Lombard laws (it.)
