= Consultant Senate =

The Consultant Senate was the formal advisory body of the Kingdom of Italy, a notionally independent French client state in Italy. It was created in 1805 and dissolved in 1814, just like the Kingdom at large. It was a deliberative assembly that informed the king about the wishes of his most important subjects.

The Consultant Senate had no real legislative power since its opinions were only optional and not binding for the king. As its role was only consultative, it is not considered to be a true legislature.
