= District of Gallarate =

The District of Gallarate was one of the four divisions of the Department of Olona, the province of Milan during the Napoleonic Italian Republic. It received the numeral IV and its capital was Gallarate.

== The district ==
Founded on May 13, 1801, it had a population of 111,120 inhabitants. It was composed by the communes of Gallarate and other communes in the northwestern part of the department.

== Sources ==
- Historical database of Lombard laws (it.)
