= District of Pavia =

The District of Pavia was one of the four divisions of the Department of Olona, the province of Milan during the Napoleonic Italian Republic. It received the numeral II and its capital was Pavia.

== The district ==
Founded on May 13, 1801, it had a population of 119,105 inhabitants.

It was composed by the communes of:

- Pavia
- Belgioioso
- Santa Margherita
- Albuzzano
- Butirrago
- Montesano
- Vigulfo
- Filighera
- Linarolo
- Spessa e Spessetta Balbiani
- Torre de' Negri
- Barona
- Carpignano con Strazzago
- VImanone
- Cà de' Tedioli
- Fossarmato
- Calignano
- Ceranova
- Lardirago
- Marzano
- Roncaro
- Sant'Alessio
- Vialone
- Spirago
- Vistarino
- Vivente
- Vaccarizza
- Valle Salimbene
- Belvedere
- Motta San Damiano
- Cà della Terra
- Prado
- Cantugno
- Mirabello
- Borgarello
- Comairano
- Ponte Carate
- San Genesio
- Torre del Mangano
- Bornasco
- Corbesate
- Misano
- Settimo
- Villareggio
- Zeccone
- Genzone
- Chignolo con Alberone e Botterone
- Corteolona
- Costa San Zenone
- Santa Cristina
- San Zenone
- Zerbo
- Badia
- Bissone
- Nizzolaro con Bolterone
- Campo Rinaldo
- Mezzano Parpanese
- Pieve Porto Morone
- Conticelli con Gabbiano e Mezzana
- Cantonale
- Binasco
- Badile
- Moirago
- Bubbiano
- Casarile
- Zavenasco
- Pasturago
- Liconasco
- Basilica Bologna
- Ronchetto con Cassina Scaccabarozzi
- Villarasca
- Casirate
- Mettone
- Lacchiarella
- Mandrugno
- Viano
- San Novo
- Zibido San Giacomo
- Vigonzino
- San Pietro Cusico
- Vernate
- Barate
- Copiago
- Moncucco
- Coazzano
- Conigo
- Tainate
- Noviglio
- Gudo Visconti
- Rosate
- Vigano
- Zelo
- Rognano
- Soncino
- Giussago
- Casatico
- Giovenzano
- Quinzano
- Carpignago
- Abbiategrasso
- Bugo
- Ozzero
- Robecco con Casterno
- Gaggiano
- Bonirola
- Lugagnano
- Caselle
- Ticinello
- Vermezzo
- Castelletto con Mendosio
- Bereguardo
- Pissarello
- Marcignago
- Origioso
- Velezzo
- San Perone
- Battuda
- Torriano
- Torrino e Torradello
- Trivolzio
- Casorate
- Calvignasco
- Papiago
- Trovo
- Zelada
- Cassina Calderara
- Montebello
- Villalunga
- Cassina de' Serigari
- Molinazzo
- Torre d'Isola
- Santa Sofia
- Cassina de' Tolentini
- San Varese
- Motta Visconti
- Besate
- Fallavecchia
- Basiano
- Coronate con Morimondo
- Genzago
- Inverno
- Copiano
- Magherno
- Monteleone
- Torre d'Arese
- Villanterio
- Siccomario
- con le ville di Costa Cavagliana
- Gere con Chiozzo
- Rato de Rea
- Mezzanino
- Mezzana d'Ancorbate
- Mezzano Corti
- Mezzana con Cassina Lebba in Mezzano
- San martino
- Santa Maria della Strada con Torre de' Cani
- Santa Maria Travaccio con Cassina Lebba
- Valbona
- Verrua
- Sommo
- Zibido al Lambro
- Cavagnera
- Mandrino
- Cassina Bianca
- Landriano
- Vidigulfo
- Vairano
- Pontelungo
- Gnignano con Siziano
- Villamaggiore
- Gualdrasco
- Campomorto
- La Cava
- Campomaggiore con Sabbione
- San Fedele con Truvido.

== Sources ==
- Historical database of Lombard laws (it.)
