= Stefano Bonsignori (bishop) =

Roman Catholic Bishop

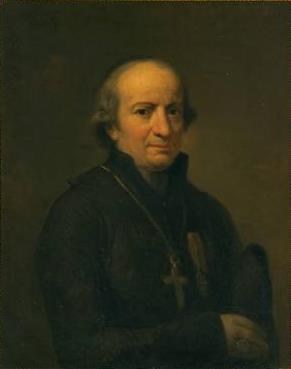
Bonsignori

Stefano Bonsignori or Bonsignore O.SS.C.A. (23 February 1738, Busto Arsizio - 23 December 1826, Faenza) was an Italian cleric, bishop and theologian. Napoleon I appointed him patriarch of Venice, but this appointment was not confirmed by the Holy See.

== Life ==
=== Academic ===
A son of the cotton merchant Giovanni Battista Bonsignori and his wife Giovanna Galeazzi, he began his education under an uncle who was a priest, before moving to the Archepiscopal Seminary of Milan. In 1759 he entered the oblates of Saints Ambrose and Charles and was ordained priest at the end of 1760. He served as a grammar teacher at the seminaries in Celana and Gorla, then as a rhetoric and theology teacher at the main seminary in Milan and the Helvetic College. During this time he became part of the circle of scholars gathered by cardinal Angelo Maria Durini - others included count Karl Joseph von Firmian, archbishop Giuseppe Pozzobonelli and Carlo Trivulzio. He became an orator, epigraphist and church historian and in 1774 was made doctor of the Biblioteca Ambrosiana. The following year he graduated in theology from the University of Pavia.

In 1791, after the seminaries reopened following the limitations on the general seminary, he was made professor of dogmatic theology and prefect of studies, with a substantial salary. He became a noted and rich orator and theologian and in 1797 he was admitted to the prestigious Metropolitan Chapter as a canon theologian. This period of success soon stopped, however, with the founding of the Cisalpine Republic, the abolition of cathedral chapters and the confiscation of their goods. Probably thanks to contacts with politicians, Bonsignori gained a 1,200 lire pension and met Napoleon after he came to Milan following his victory at the battle of Marengo. He gained the general's sympathy and accompanied archbishop Filippo Maria Visconti to the Consulte de Lyon as an advisor.

=== Bishopric ===
Thanks to Francesco Melzi d'Eril, vice-president of the new Italian Republic, he gained several important posts in the following years, as part of Melzi's attempts to reinstate those linked to the aristocratic world swept away by the Cisalpine Republic. In a list of names proposed as diocesan bishops in Italy, Melzi wrote by Bonsignori's name "one of ours". Whilst he waited for the 1801 Concordat to come into force, Bonsignori became a member of the Istituto Nazionale and vice-director of the Biblioteca di Brera. Only on 5 April 1806 did Napoleon nominate him to be bishop of Faenza, confirmed on 18 September 1807 by pope Pius VII. He was consecrated as a bishop by archbishop Antonio Codronchi on 27 December 1807 and on 13 March the following year took possession of his diocese.

He was one of the most pro-French bishops, albeit in a passive form, even when the First French Empire annexed the Papal States and when Pius was put under house arrest after excommunicating Napoleon. This put him at odds with Pius' attempts at resistance. He even wrote a letter to his diocese's parish priests in 1810 praising a circular by the Minister of Religion and ascribing civil marriage the same value as church marriage. He was suitably rewarded with the titles of count, baron, commander of the Order of the Iron Crown and Grand Official of the Kingdom of Italy. This culminated in Napoleon's nomination of him as Patriarch of Venice on 9 February 1811, without approval from the pope, who continued to see him as only bishop of Faenza. Bonsignori reached the Lagoon on 9 April but did not spend much time there, since on 5 May he reached Paris for a council, where he acted as secretary and made no major interventions. He was similarly passive at the later deputation of Savona between October 1811 and February 1812. In 1813 he reached Pius in his captivity at Fontainebleau, but again took no active part in the negotiations for the new concordat.

=== After Napoleon ===
After Napoleon's first fall in 1814 Bonsignori renounced his loyalty to him and withdrew his statements about civil marriage. He left Venice on 5 May 1814 and made a sermon at Faenza Cathedral confessing his guilt. Pius then sentenced him to a year in which he was not allowed to hold pontifical masses, after which he was allowed to return to his diocese. He became a strong supporter of Pius' attempts to return to the pre-Napoleonic status quo - he rebuilt the college of urban parish priests, restored the suppressed monasteries and parishes and opened new monasteries at Bagnacavallo and at Fognano, Brisighella. He later reorganised the episcopal seminary, leaving it his collection of books and manuscripts.
