= Charles Mannay =

French Roman Catholic Church theologian and bishop

- Bishop of Trier
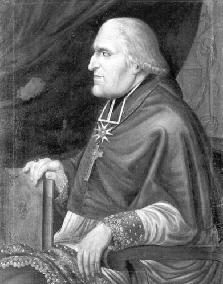
- Charles Mannay
- Previous post(s): Bishop of Auxerre and Rennes

Orders
- Ordination: March 30, 1770
- Consecration: July 18, 1802 by Antoine Xavier Mayneaud de Pancemont

Personal details
- Born: October 14, 1745; Champeix, France
- Died: December 5, 1824; Rennes, France
- Coat of arms

Charles Mannay (October 14, 1745 – December 5, 1824) was a French Roman Catholic Church theologian and bishop, serving in the dioceses of Trier, Auxerre, and Rennes during the late 18th and early 19th centuries.

== Biography ==
Charles Mannay was born in Champeix in Auvergne, within the Diocese of Clermont. On May 7, 1780, he was appointed canon of the Metropolitan Chapter of Reims. In 1782, he became prior at the Priory of Notre-Dame in Conflans-Sainte-Honorine, the last person to hold the position until its suppression in 1789. A man of great compassion, he worked to alleviate the suffering of local residents following the devastating tornado of August 13, 1788, which caused severe damage from Bordeaux to the Low Countries.

On February 26, 1787, he was promoted to Vicar General of the Archdiocese of Reims. He also served as tutor to the young Charles-Maurice Talleyrand, directing and possibly drafting Talleyrand's dissertation in 1783 upon his attainment of a doctorate from the Sorbonne.

During the French Revolution, Mannay emigrated to England and later to Scotland, returning to France only after the signing of the Concordat of 1801.

Appointed Bishop of Trier by Napoleon Bonaparte, Mannay was consecrated on July 18, 1802, at the Church of the Carmelites in Paris by Antoine Xavier Mayneaud de Pancemont, Bishop of Vannes, with assistance from the bishops of Digne and Nice.

In 1807, he was awarded the title of Chevalier of the Legion of Honour, promoted to Officer in 1809, and made a Baron of the Empire in 1808. He became one of Napoleon's ecclesiastical advisors in 1809, along with Louis-Mathias de Barral and Jean-Baptiste Duvoisin. While the Pope was held in France, he led an ecclesiastical council in Paris, helping pressure Pius VII to agree with the Concordat of Fontainebleau in 1811.

After the Prussian invasion, Mannay resigned from his position in November 1816.

King Louis XVIII nominated him as Bishop of Auxerre in 1817, but as the diocese had not yet been reestablished, Mannay could not assume the role. In 1820, he was named Bishop of Rennes, where he served until his death on December 5, 1824. He is buried in the south transept of Notre-Dame-en-Saint-Melaine, which served as the temporary cathedral of Rennes during the reconstruction of Saint-Pierre Cathedral.

== Coat of Arms ==
Letters patent dated November 22, 1808, granted Charles Mannay the following arms: "Quartered: first and fourth argent with three sable bars; second gules with a gold cross; third azure with a rampant lion or."

Later, his arms were altered to resemble those of Pope Pius IX, with whom they should not be confused. Both sets of arms are displayed on the stained glass windows of Rennes Cathedral:

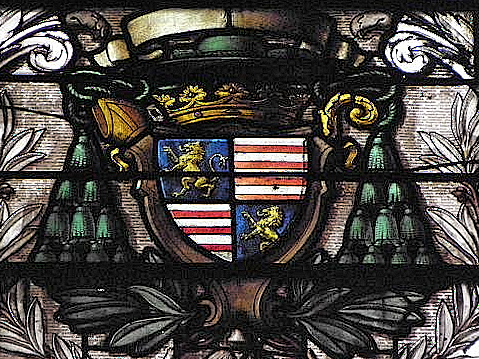
Arms of Charles Mannay

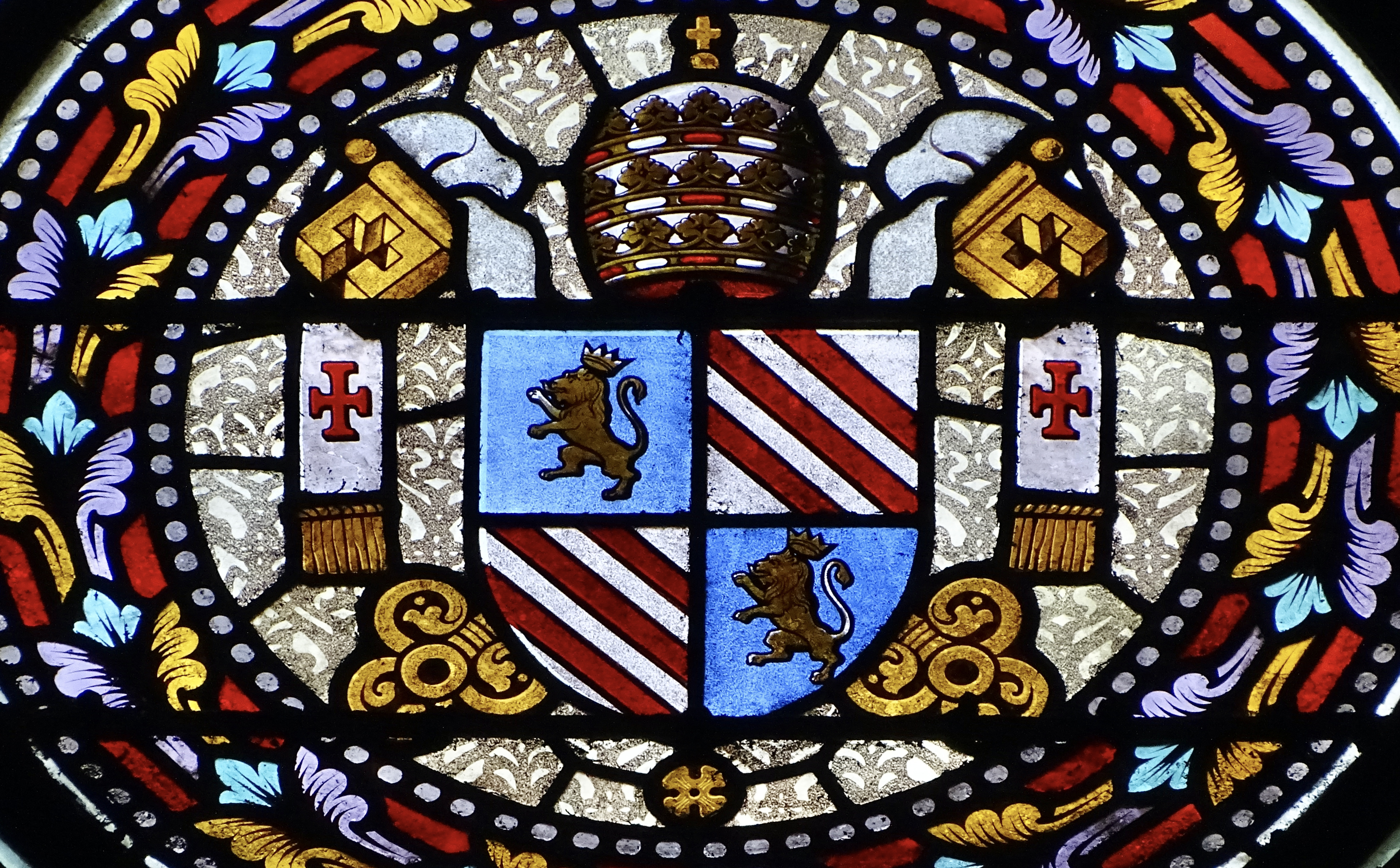
Arms of Pope Pius IX, topped by the tiara

== Distinctions ==
- Legion of Honour: Officer (January 25, 1813)

== Sources ==
- "CEF de Rennes". Archived from the original on September 6, 2013.
- Émile Bouchez, Le clergé de Reims pendant la Révolution et la suppression de l'Archevêché de Reims (1789-1821), Paris, 1913.
- Patrice Dupuy, Sainte Honorine, pèlerinage et prieuré de Conflans, des origines à nos jours, Valhermeil, Pontoise, 2000.

Preceded by Étienne Célestin Enoch	Bishop of Rennes; 1820–1824	Succeeded by Claude-Louis de Lesquen
