= Council of Paris (1811) =

Council hold in Paris in 1811

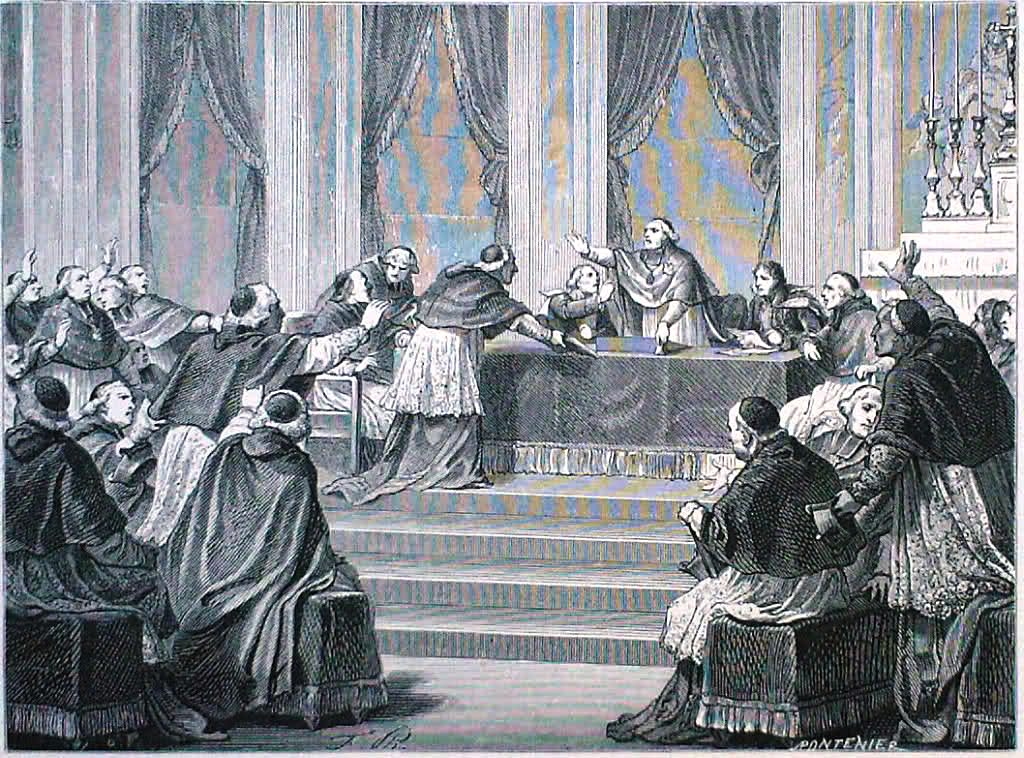
- The council, session of July 10
- Date: June 17, 1811 – August 5, 1811
- Location: Notre-Dame de Paris, Paris, First French Empire
- Type: Church Council (particular)
- Organized by: Napoleon I
- Participants

The Council of Paris or National Council was an abortive council of the church that attempted to impose Napoleon I's will on Pope Pius VII on a number of church issues. Held in two key phases from June 17 to August 5, 1811, at Notre-Dame de Paris, the council occurred while the Pope was imprisoned in Savona before being secretly transferred to Fontainebleau on June 12, 1812.

Napoleon sought to transfer the right to approve new bishops from the Pope to the metropolitan bishop, but he faced opposition from the prelates, who insisted that all decisions must be personally approved by the Pope.

== Proceedings of the Council ==
=== Preliminary negotiations ===
Before the council convened, Napoleon dispatched three prelates—Louis-Mathias de Barral, Jean-Baptiste Duvoisin, and Charles Mannay—along with Stefano Bonsignore to Savona to negotiate with Pope Pius VII. Despite pressure from this delegation, the Pope refused to consider the "note" they drafted as a formal agreement, viewing it instead as a proposal for discussion. After their departure, Pius VII formally rejected two clauses of the note, declaring, "Fortunately, we have signed nothing." The note suggested that the Pope would: "institute the bishops already appointed" and allow metropolitans to institute bishops not receiving papal bulls within six months.

=== First Phase (June 17 – July 10) ===
The council began on June 17, but initial sessions focused on drafting an address to the Emperor. These discussions were prolonged, as Italian bishops resisted incorporating Gallican doctrines from the Declaration of the Clergy of France of 1682.

Eventually, a majority of prelates sided with Pope Pius VII, though they requested permission to present the dire state of the Empire's churches to the Pope before reporting their decision to Napoleon. This angered the Emperor.

On July 7, Napoleon referred to his "agreement" with the Pope—an assertion the Pope had previously refuted. Initially, the council accepted Napoleon's project but reversed their decision the following day. Napoleon's proposal was as follows:

- Bishops would be appointed by the Emperor and canonically instituted by the senior metropolitan.
- If the metropolitan refused, the Court of Appeal would declare the see vacant.
- In vacant dioceses, seminaries would be closed, students relocated, and priests appointed by prefects.

Furious at the council's reversal, Napoleon dissolved it by imperial decree on July 11, 1811.

=== Second Phase (July 10 – August 5) ===
To de-escalate tensions, Cardinal Étienne Hubert de Cambacérès, Archbishop of Rouen, expressed submission to the Emperor, though with reservations. On July 22, Napoleon demanded the council's president, Cardinal Joseph Fesch, do the same, but Fesch refused.

== Participants ==
The council brought together cardinals, archbishops, and bishops. Key attendees included:

=== Cardinals ===
- Joseph Fesch, Archbishop of Lyon, President of the Council
- Jean-Sifrein Maury, Archbishop-designate of Paris
- Antonio Felice Zondadari, Archbishop of Siena
- Giuseppe Spina, Archbishop of Genoa
- Étienne Hubert de Cambacérès, Archbishop of Rouen

=== Archbishops ===
- Antonio Codronchi, Archbishop of Ravenna
- Charles François d'Aviau du Bois de Sanzay, Archbishop of Bordeaux
- Claude Le Coz, Archbishop of Besançon
- Louis-Mathias de Barral, Archbishop of Tours
- Dominique Dufour de Pradt, Archbishop of Malines

=== Bishops ===
- Jean-Baptiste Marie Caffarelli, Bishop of Saint-Brieuc
- Charles Mannay, Bishop of Trier
- Jean-Baptiste Duvoisin, Bishop of Nantes
- Louis Belmas, Bishop of Cambrai
- Clemens August Droste zu Vischering, Archbishop of Cologne

== Bibliography ==
- Louis-Mathias de Barral (1814). Fragments relatifs à l'histoire ecclésiastique des premières années du XIX.
- Ledré, Charles (1946). "Un archevêque français au concile de 1811". Revue d'histoire de l'Église de France. 32.
- Alphonse de Beauchamp (1814). Histoire des malheurs et de la captivité de Pie VII. F. Le Prieur. pp. 387–392.
- Clere (1811). Cérémonial du Concile national de Paris, tenu l'an 1811. p. 58.
