= Consulte de Lyon =

Ad hoc convention of Italian delegates in Lyon to proclaim the First Italian Republic

Painting of the Consulte by Nicolas-André Monsiau (1806–08).

The Consulte de Lyon (consulta of Lyon) or consulte de la république cisalpine (consulta of the Cisalpine Republic) was an extraordinary meeting in the former chapel of the Jesuit college of the Trinity in Lyon during the French Consulate. It was held from 11 to 26 January 1802 and converted the Cisalpine Republic into the Italian Republic, with Napoleon Bonaparte as its president.

== Course ==
As first consul, Bonaparte decided to call an extraordinary consulta or meeting of the Italian deputies of the Cisalpine Republic in Lyon. This republic had been created after the first Italian campaign and was made up of Lombardy, Mantua, Bergamo, Brescia, Verona, Cremona, Rovigo, the duchy of Modena, Massa, and Carrara, and three legations from Bologna, Ferrara, and Romagna. The proposal for the meeting was highly successful - 452 deputies were named to attend it, though it was effectively a parody of a constituent assembly, with its members vetted by Bonaparte, an order of business imposed upon it, and pressure exerted upon it to approve Bonaparte's wishes.

Over the following days, the consul received deputations from the neighbouring towns and departments, while the 'consulte' continued with its business. On 26 January it met in the presence of the French ministers, generals, major functionaries, and Joséphine in the chapel of the Jesuit College of the Trinity (now lycée Ampère). The First Consul presided and opened the meeting with a speech in Italian, under pressure from Talleyrand, who wished to end the quarrel between Aldini and Melzi, both of whom had been offered the presidency of the meeting but had both, in turn, rejected it. In this speech Bonaparte converted the Cisalpine Republic into the Italian Republic, bringing applause from the assembly.

== Notable figures present ==
=== Italian delegation ===
- Antonio Aldini
- Vincenzo Brunetti, as secretary of the meeting, read the new constitution on 26 January.
- Francesco Melzi d'Eril
- The archbishops of Ravenna (Antonio Codronchi) and Cesena, the bishops of Pavia, Bergamo, Lodi and Cremona.
- Filippo Maria Visconti, archbishop of Milan, aged 82, a friend of Bonaparte, travelled to Lyon for the meeting but died of a heart attack whilst talking to Talleyrand at a dinner on 31 December 1801 - Pietro Moscati tried in vain to save him.
- Antonio Cagnoli, president of the Italian Society of Sciences
- Giuseppe Fenaroli
- Luigi Porro Lambertenghi
- Giuseppe Lechi
- Ferdinando Marescalchi
- Giovanni Martinengo
- Pietro Moscati, doctor
- Giovanni Paradisi
- Giuseppe Prina
- Alessandro Volta, inventor of the battery
- Giuseppe Zola

=== French delegation ===
- Napoléon Bonaparte
- Joséphine de Beauharnais
- Joachim Murat
- Charles-Maurice de Talleyrand-Périgord
- Jean-Baptiste Jules Bernadotte
