= Constitution of the Cisalpine Republic =

Constitution of the Cisalpine Republic may refer to the following texts of the Cisalpine Republic:

- Constitution of the Cisalpine Republic (1797)
- Constitution of the Cisalpine Republic (1798)
- Constitution of the Cisalpine Republic (1801)
