= Ferdinando Marescalchi =

Italian diplomat and politician

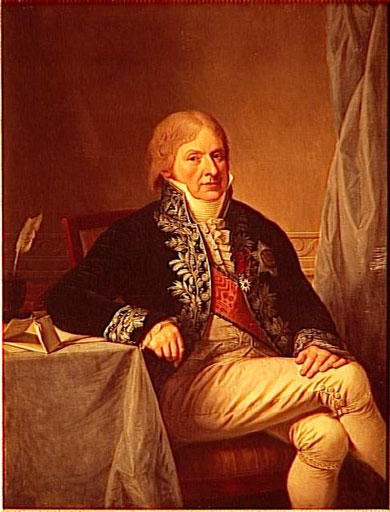
Ferdinando Marescalchi by Guttenbrun.

Ferdinando, comte Marescalchi (26 February 1754, Bologna - 22 June 1816, Milan) was an Italian diplomat and politician.

== Life ==
=== The Republics of Italy ===
He was from an old noble family which had originated in Vicenza. He studied law at the University of Bologna, became a magistrate and became a hereditary member of the senate which governed Bologna. When the French invaded Italy, he led the faction which openly declared in their favour and came to the attention of Bonaparte, who placed much trust and confidence in him. He was a strong supporter of the political reform of 1796 and when the Cispadane Republic was formed that year he became part of its executive directory. The Cisalpine Republic sent him to Vienna as its plenipotentiary in 1799, but he was only able to gain a single audience with Francis I of Austria. He then became plenipotentiary to the Second Congress of Rastatt (9 December 1797 to 23 April 1799).

26 janvier 1802, The Consulte de la République cisalpine by >Nicolas-André Monsiau, 1806-08.

On his return he was elected director-president in March 1799, but soon the Russo-Austrian invasion forced him and his colleagues to flee to France until they were able to return after the Battle of Marengo. In July 1800 he was made the Cisalpine representative to Paris. He took part in the 1801-02 Consulte de Lyon in the former chapel of the Jesuit college of the trinity (now the chapel of the Lycée Ampère on rue de la Bourse). At first it suggested electing Francesco Melzi d'Eril, then Antonio Aldini, as president, but they both declined. Talleyrand then intervened and suggested that the Italians elect Bonaparte himself, due to the presence of French troops in Italy and the reluctance of the other Italian states to recognise the Cisalpine Republic - this suggestion was accepted, with Marescalchi's full support.

Napoleon made his acceptance speech in Italian on 26 January 1802 (he had effectively arrived in France aged 9 speaking Italian and no French and always spoke French with an accent on certain words and used several unusual spellings) and in it changed the Cisalpine Republic's name to the Italian Republic. This led to riotous applause. Bonaparte then chose Melzi d'Eril as vice-president, to reside in Milan.

=== Ambassador to Paris ===
Marescalchi lived in Paris as the Republic's foreign minister from 1802 to 1805. He was strongly supported in his work by Bernier, bishop of Orléans, who with Giovanni Battista Caprara co-organised the Concordat between Rome and Italian Republic, signed in Paris on 9 September 1803. Marescalchi also assisted in the coronation of Napoleon I on 2 December 1804.

After the 'acte de la consulta', which made Napoleon king of Italy, Marescalchi became his representative in France, but with limited autonomy in Italy. He and Emmanuel Crétet signed a Franco-Italian trade treaty on 20 June 1808. He rented Hôtel de Massa as his Paris residence and held many festivities there, making it a key meeting point for the nobility of the First French Empire and launching the fashion for masked or fancy-dress balls. In 1809 he received the emperor himself before setting off for the Battle of Wagram.

When the Grand Orient of Italy was set up on 20 June 1805, Marescalchi was its grand conservator and prince Eugène de Beauharnais its grandmaster. Napoleon also made Marescalchi a count of the Kingdom of Italy in December 1810 (by letters patent of 12 April 1809), grand chancellor of the Order of the Iron Crown and a member of all the Napoleonic orders. He was also member of the electoral college of Reno.

After Napoleon's abdication, Marie-Louise of Austria made Marescalchi governor of the Grand Duchy of Parma and Piacenza. He was also the Austrian emperor's plenipotentiary at Modena, where he died on 22 June 1816.

== Works ==
- Histoire de la Consulte de Lyon ;
- Considérations sur les rapports de la France avec les autres puissances de l'Europe ;
- Commentaires sur Plutarque ;
- An Italian translation of the three-act verse comedy La Comédienne by François Andrieux, to be put on in Modena's court theatre

He also published sonnets and 'canzoni'.
