= Abbamonte =

Abbamonte is a surname. Notable people with the surname include:

- Giuseppe Abbamonte (1759–1818), Italian politician
- Lee Abbamonte (born 1978), American blogger and entrepreneur
