= Agostino Paradisi =

Italian poet, economist, and teacher

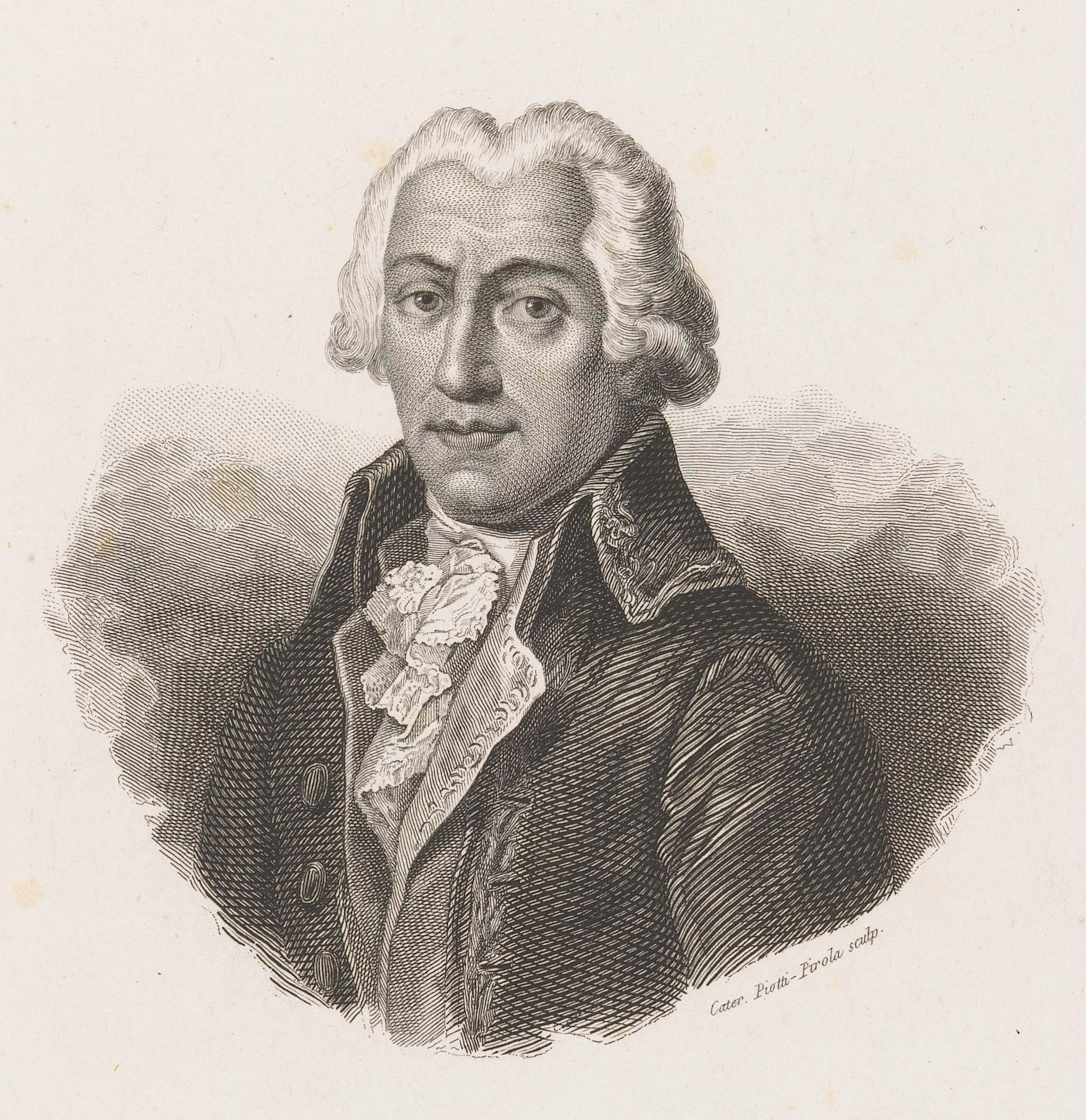
- Engraved portrait of Agostino Paradisi by Caterina Piotti-Pirola
- Born: 25 April 1736; Vignola, Duchy of Modena and Reggio
- Died: 19 February 1783 (aged 46); Reggio Emilia, Duchy of Modena and Reggio
- Occupations: Writer; Playwright
- Employer: University of Modena
- Writing career
- Language: Italian
- Genres: Poetry; translation
- Movement: Italian Enlightenment

Count Agostino Paradisi (25 April 1736 – 19 February 1783) was an Italian poet, economist and teacher. His son, Giovanni Paradisi, was a mathematician and prominent politician during the Cisalpine Republic.

== Biography ==
Agostino Paradisi was born in Vignola, near Modena, on 25 April 1736. He was the son of Gianmaria Paradisi, an abbot who later returned to lay life, and his wife, Teresa Gastaldi. Following his father's death in 1737, Agostino moved with his mother and younger sister to Reggio Emilia.

At the age of ten, he enrolled at the Piarist Collegio Nazareno in Rome, where he studied from 1746 to 1753. He returned to Reggio Emilia in 1753, where he continued his studies and developed an interest in poetry and scientific and historical literature.

Paradisi travelled extensively around Italy, living in Venice, Genoa and Bologna. There, he devoted himself to writing plays and translating French dramas with his friend, Francesco Albergati Capacelli. In August 1771, he was appointed secretary to the Royal Academy of Mantua by Karl Joseph von Firmian, the renowned patron of the arts and Minister Plenipotentiary of Austrian Lombardy.

In late 1772, Duke Francesco III d'Este appointed Paradisi to the Chair of Political economy at the University of Modena. He remained in Modena until the end of 1780, when he resigned and returned to Reggio Emilia. Paradisi died of thoracic oedema on 19 February 1783, aged 46.
