= Aldini =

Aldini is an Italian surname. Notable people with the surname include:

- Antonio Aldini (1755–1826), Italian lawyer and politician
- Carlo Aldini (1894–1961), Italian actor and film producer
- Giovanni Aldini (1762–1834), Italian physicist
