= Francesco Albergati Capacelli =

Italian writer and playwright

- Engraved portrait of Francesco Albergati Capacelli by Mauro Gandolfi
- Born: 19 April 1728; Bologna, Papal States
- Died: 16 March 1804 (aged 75); Zola Predosa, Bologna, Papal States
- Burial place: Certosa di Bologna
- Occupations: Writer; Playwright
- Writing career
- Language: Italian
- Genres: Poetry; translation
- Movement: Italian Enlightenment

Francesco Albergati Capacelli (19 April 1728 – 16 March 1804) was an Italian writer and playwright.

== Biography ==
=== Early life ===
Francesco Albergati Capacelli was born in Bologna, where he was a marquess and senator and an important administrator. He led a stormy personal life and was married three times. He was accused of murdering his second wife, Caterina Boccadabati, in a fit of jealousy, and he had to flee from Zola Predosa, near Bologna.

In Zola, Albergati devoted himself to his passion: theatre. Using his considerable resources, he had a three-hundred-seat theatre built at his opulent villa in Zola. There, he performed Italian and French comedies and tragedies – the latter either translated by himself or by others – alongside fellow amateurs. The villa's theatre became a lively meeting place for the intellectual elite of central Italy. Albergati soon gained recognition in Italian Enlightenment circles and began corresponding with several notable figures, including Carlo Goldoni, Vincenzo Monti, Giuseppe Compagnoni, and Francesco Bertazzoli.

=== Literary activity ===
In 1751, Albergati translated Joseph Addison's Dialogues on Medals (Dell'utilità delle antiche medaglie, Bologna, 1760), after which he turned to French theatre. Together with Agostino Paradisi, he published a collection titled Scelta di alcune eccellenti tragedie francesi tradotte (Modena, 1764-1768). His notable translations include Racine's Phèdre and Iphigénie, as well as Voltaire's Don Pèdre, Sophonisbe, and Les Guèbres ou la tolérance.

In 1766, he founded the 'Ravvivati', an academic theatre set up inside the large main hall of Palazzo Leoni, Bologna. A few months later, he wrote his first original stage work, L'Amor finto e l'Amor vero (Feigned Love and True Love). In 1768, he began an extensive correspondence with the Venetian writer Elisabetta Caminèr Turra. The daughter of Domenico Caminèr, editor of the periodicals L'Europa letteraria and Giornale enciclopedico, Elisabetta had popularised the taste for comédie larmoyantes in Italy through her numerous of French translations. Traces of Caminèr's influence can be found in Albergati's subsequent work, which features sentimental dramas and elements of the larmoyant style. In 1774, his five-act sentimental drama in verse Il Prigioniero (The Prisoner) won a competition held in Parma by Guillaume du Tillot. Between 1774 and 1778, he published a five-volume collection titled Il Nuovo Teatro Comico (The New Comic Theatre) in Venice, which included several tragedies he had translated from French.

=== Later career ===
In 1779, Albergati collaborated with the former Jesuit Giovanni Francesco Altanesi on Novelle morali ad uso dei fanciulli (Moral Tales for Children). Together with the Abbé Francesco Zacchiroli, he published a collection titled Lettere capricciose (Whimsical Letters; Venice, 1786), a collection of brilliant letters on literary and scientific topics. After marrying Teresa Checchi Zampieri in 1791, he returned permanently to Bologna, devoting himself to new literary projects. He exchanged Lettere piacevoli, se piaceranno (Pleasant Letters – If They Please; Venice, 1792) with Giuseppe Compagnoni, and Varie (Miscellaneous Works; Parma, 1793) with Canon and future cardinal Francesco Bertazzoli.

Although he remained an enlightened nonconformist throughout his life, he firmly rejected and condemned the excesses of the French Revolution. Nevertheless, he was involved in public affairs during the Napoleonic era. In 1798, he published a pamphlet titled Della drammatica (On Drama) in Milan, in which he defended press freedom – albeit within certain moral limits – and engaged in a polite dispute with those who sought to ban any works not inspired by 'civic virtue'. His moderate stance won him the favour of the government, which first appointed him as a censor of publications alongside Ludovico Savioli in 1800, and then as an inspector of theatrical performances the following year. As a censor, he banned a translation of Rousseau's Julie; or, The New Heloise on moral grounds – a decision that illustrates his transformation from a youthful admirer of Enlightenment authors to a conservative figure. Despite it having been promised to him, he failed to secure the chair of dramatic literature at the University of Bologna. However, in February 1804, he was appointed director of elementary schools in Bologna instead. He died just a few weeks later, on 16 March 1804.

== Works ==
- Le convulsioni (comedy in prose in one act);
- Nuovo Teatro Comico (1774-1978), 5 volume series including:
  - Le convulsioni;
  - Il ciarlatano maldicente;
  - Pregiudizi del falso onore;
- Novelle morali ad uso dei fanciulli (1779);
- Il Saggio Amico, Commedia (1769);
- Pasquale ossia Il postiglione burlato (a joint dramatic work with F. Malaspina, turned into a one-act drama by Filippo Pallavicino).

=== Translations from French ===
- Inès de Castro, drama from Antoine Houdar de la Motte;
- Il conte di Commingio, drama from François-Thomas-Marie de Baculard d'Arnaud, translated in verse, Verona, Stamperia Moroni, 1767;
- Phèdre from Jean Racine.

=== Letters ===
- Lettere piacevoli, se piaceranno (1792) to Giuseppe Compagnoni;
- Lettere varie (1793) to Francesco Bertazzoli;
- Raccolta delle Lettere capricciose di Francesco Albergati Capacelli e di Francesco Zacchiroli dai medesimi capricciosamente stampate, Venice, 1786.

== Bibliography ==
- Asor Rosa, Alberto (1960). "ALBERGATI CAPACELLI, Francesco". Dizionario Biografico degli Italiani (in Italian). Vol. 1: Aaron–Albertucci. Rome: Istituto dell'Enciclopedia Italiana. OCLC 883370.
- Vecchi Calore, Marina (1985). "Alcuni aspetti della personalità di Francesco Albergati Capacelli". Le théâtre italien et l'Europe (XVIIe-XVIIIe siècles). Florence: Leo S. Olschki. pp. 241–253. ISBN 978-8822233585.
- Turchi, Roberta (1986). "Amici per il teatro: Francesco Albergati Capacelli ed Agostino Paradisi". In Susi Davoli (ed.). Civiltà Teatrale e Settecento Emiliano. Bologna: Il Mulino. pp. 97–114.
- Mattioda, Enrico (1993). Il dilettante per mestiere: Francesco Albergati Capacelli commediografo. Bologna: Il Mulino. ISBN 978-8815037886.
- Zilotti, Elena (2024). Un poeta di compagnia sui generis. L'attività teatrale di Francesco Albergati Capacelli nel secondo Settecento. Mantua: Il Rio. ISBN 979-1259890771.
