= Marescalchi =

Marescalchi is a surname. Notable people with the surname include:

- Ferdinando Marescalchi, (1754 - 1816), Italian diplomat and politician
- Pietro Marescalchi, Italian painter of the Renaissance

== See also ==
- Marascalco
