= Serbelloni =

Serbelloni is a surname. Notable people with the surname include:

- Fabrizio Serbelloni (1695–1775), Italian diplomat and cardinal
- Gabrio Serbelloni (1509–1580), Italian condottiero and general
- Giovanni Antonio Serbelloni (1519–1591), Italian cardinal
- Giovanni Galeazzo Serbelloni (1744–1802), Milanese nobleman
