= Giovanni Galeazzo Serbelloni =

Milanese nobleman

Gian Galeazzo Serbelloni (6 July 1744 – 7 March 1802) was a Milanese nobleman, notable as president of the founding Directory of the Cisalpine Republic and as preceptor to the Milanese poet Giuseppe Parini.

== Life ==
He was born in Milan to Gabrio Serbelloni, 3rd Duke of San Gabrio, and his wife Maria Vittoria Ottoboni, making him part of a rich noble family. From 1776 onwards he was superintendent of Milan's urban militia. He backed French Republican ideals after Napoleon Bonaparte's invasion of Italy and occupation of Lombardy, renouncing his noble titles of count of Castiglione Lodigiano, Grandee of Spain, Duke of San Gabrio, feudal lord of Romagnano, marquis of Incisa, co-lord of Castelnuovo Belbo, and feudal lord of Gorgonzola, Camporicco and Cassina de' Pecchi.

On 21 May 1796 he joined Milan's first democratic city council and a month later arrived in Paris with Fedele Sopransi and Niccoli to plead the cause of Lombard liberty (in their own words "the votes of the Lombard nation for liberty") to the French Directory. In his Storia dell'invasione dei francesi repubblicani nel Milanese, Pietro Verri criticised the choice of men for this diplomatic mission and their lack of preparation, reporting Serbelloni's speech to Milan's council as including the phrase "Citizens, either my bones will remain in Paris or I shall bring you back liberty". He then returned to Milan with Joséphine de Beauharnais, who stayed in his Palazzo Serbelloni.

He took part in the Cisalpine Republic's foundation and became president of its first-ever executive Directory from 29 June 1797. He left that post on 20 November the same year to become the Republic's ambassador to Paris. Seven days after Napoleon's seizure of power on 9 November 1799 in the Coup of 18 Brumaire, Serbelloni wrote to Vertemate Franchi, president of the Directory of the Cisalpine Republic "Bonaparte is consul and in him I hope for the greatest good for our Republic. I know that we will have our independence de facto, independence which was lost on my departure from Italy and which was oppressed in different ways and at different times by so-called French patriots who proposed different measures, always to the benefit of their own purses, from the month of ventôse in Year VI right up to the present-day". On 3 frimaire in Year VIII (24 November 1799) Franchi (who had fled to Chambéry) ordered Serbelloni to congratulate the Consuls of France.

Serbelloni accompanied Napoleon back to Italy during the 1799–1800 campaign, returning to Milan after the victory at the battle of Marengo to bring order to his lands and estates which were seized by the Austrian-Russian troops of the Second Coalition when it occupied the city from 29 April onwards. He also helped edit a new constitution for the Cisalpine Republic and was made a member of its Council of State, a legislative council of ten men., before returning to Paris as a diplomat alongside Antonio Aldini.

He also attended the Consulte de Lyon on 11–26 January 1802 and shortly afterwards was elected to the Council of State. He fell seriously ill on his return to Lombardy and died in Milan on 7 March 1802.

== Bibliography ==
- (in Italian) T. Casini, « Di alcuni cooperatori italiani di Napoleone I », in Ritratti e studi, Roma 1914
- (in French) Albert Pingaud, Les hommes d'état de la république italienne 1802-1805, Paris, 1914
