= Constitution of the Cisalpine Republic (1798) =

The Constitution of the Cisalpine Republic (Italian: Costituzione della Repubblica Cisalpina), was the second constitution of the Cisalpine Republic, a sister republic of France, roughly comprising the modern-day northern regions of Lombardy and Emilia-Romagna. It came into effect just after a French golpe on 31 August 1798, replacing the 1797 Constitution.

Napoleon had gone to Egypt, so the new French general Guillaume Brune managed to impose his friends to the Milanese administration.

The local French ambassador appointed a new government, and a new Parliament reduced to 40 and 80 members for each house. Even the departments were enlarged and reduced from 20 to 11.

This constitution lasted only a year, ending when war resumed and Austria conquered Milan, restoring the monarchy.

== See also ==
- Statuto Albertino
- Constitution of Italy
- Constitution of Italy (1802)
- Constitution of the Cisalpine Republic (1797)
- Constitutional Statute of Italy
