= Antonio Aldini =

Italian lawyer and politician

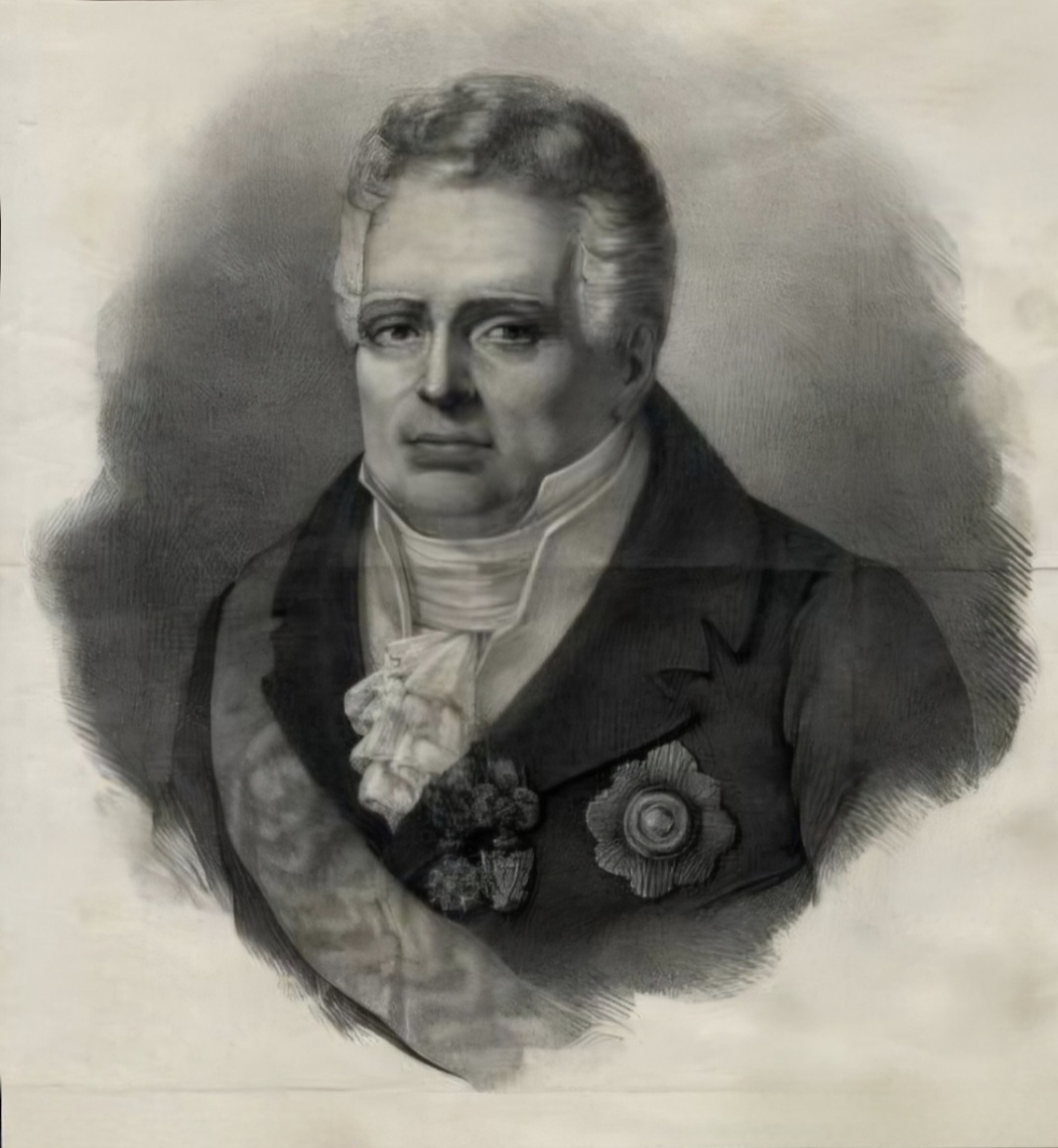
- Born: November 27, 1755; Bologna, Papal States
- Died: 30 September 1826 (aged 70); Pavia, Kingdom of Lombardy–Venetia
- Resting place: Certosa di Bologna
- Education: University of Bologna
- Occupations: Lawyer and Politician
- Era: Napoleonic era

Signature
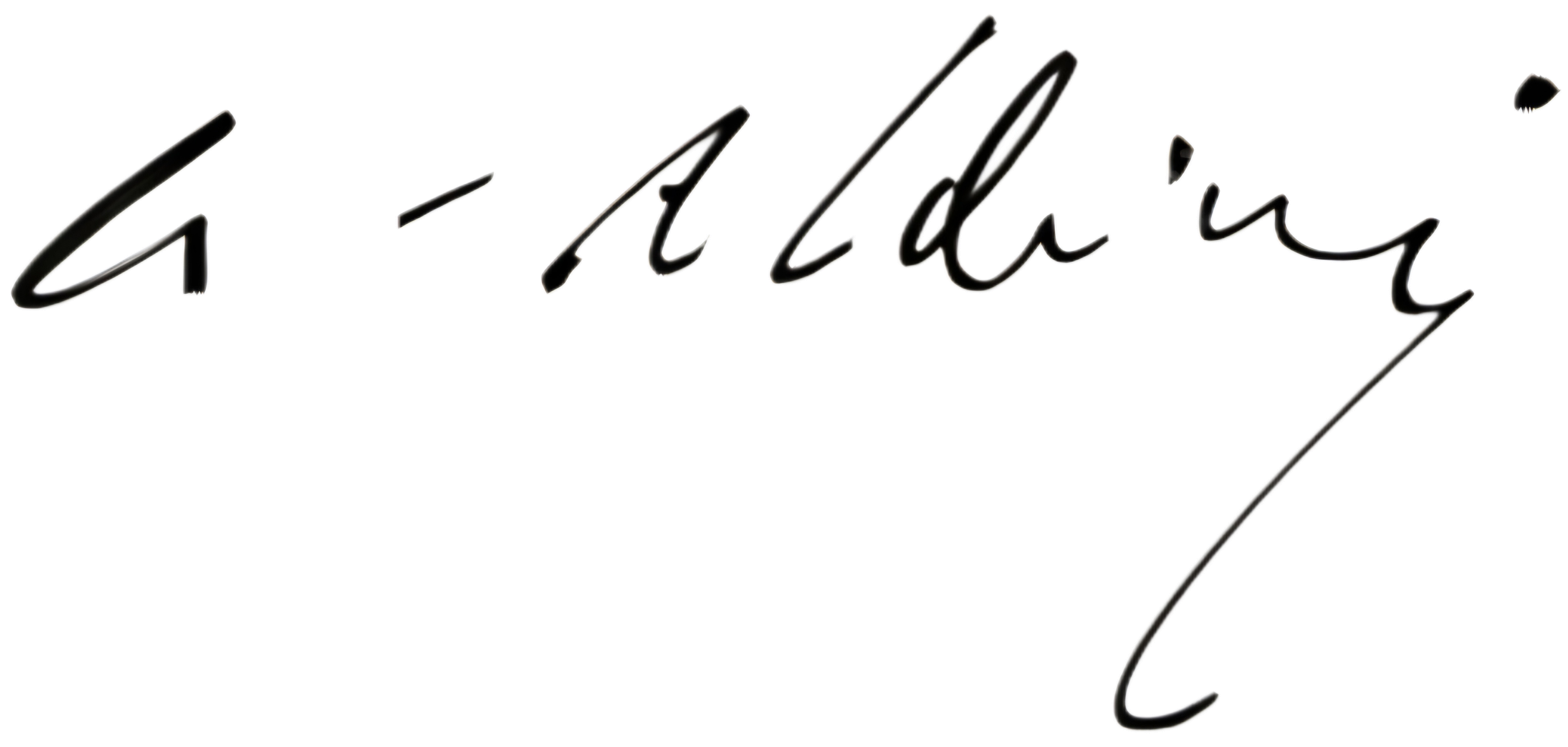

Antonio Aldini (27 November 1755, in Bologna – 30 September 1826, in Pavia) was an Italian lawyer and politician, active in the Cisalpine Republic, the Italian Republic and the Kingdom of Italy. He was held in much esteem by Napoleon, who created him a count and made him secretary of state to the Kingdom of Italy.

== Biography ==
=== Early life and education ===
Antonio Aldini was born on 27 November 1755. He was the nephew of the famous scientist Luigi Galvani, a pioneer in electrical research, and the brother of the physician and physicist Giovanni Aldini. He graduated in law in 1773 and the following year he was appointed lecturer in natural and international law at the University of Bologna. Soon after the French occupation of the Papal States in June 1796, the provisional senate of Bologna sent him, along with Ludovico Salvioli, Gaetano Conti, and Sebastiano Bologna, to Paris to plead the cause of the occupied provinces before the Directory.

=== Political career ===
Upon returning to Bologna, he was appointed President of the Congress of the Cispadane Republic, which was held in Modena in October 1796. He later took part in the Second Cispadane Congress held in Reggio and Modena (December 1796–March 1797). He was a supporter of merging the Cispadane Republic with the Cisalpine Republic to create a united national state. When this programme was temporarily abandoned, he withdrew from public life, but returned to active politics in July 1797 when Bologna, Reggio and Modena were united with the Cisalpine Republic.

Later that year, Bonaparte called on Aldini to serve on the Legislative Body of the Council of Seniors of the Cisalpine Republic. In February 1798, Aldini was elected President of the Council of Seniors. He opposed the ratification of the alliance treaty proposed by France to the Cisalpine Republic and was forced to abandon political life once more.

Following Napoleon's reoccupation of northern Italy in 1800, Aldini was appointed extraordinary envoy to Paris. His mission was to negotiate the withdrawal of French troops from the Cisalpine Republic and to secure Napoleon's approval of a draft constitution. He took part to the Consulte de Lyon, where he presided over the Second Section, responsible for Bologna and Romagna.

Following the establishment of the Italian Republic, Aldini became a member of the Legislative Body. However, following a personal disagreement with Francesco Melzi d'Eril in 1803, he was removed from his position and retired to private life for a time. After the creation of the Kingdom of Italy in March 1805, he held other minor offices before becoming Secretary of State in Paris, a post he held until the Kingdom's end.

=== Secretary of State and Congress of Vienna ===
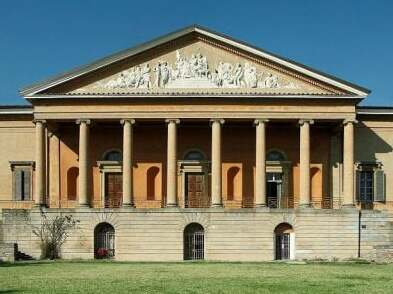
Villa Aldini, commissioned in 1811 by Antonio Aldini and designed by Giuseppe Nadi.

A close friend of Napoleon's, Aldini became his trusted adviser on Italian affairs. He built an elegant château in the park of Montmorency, near Paris, which was destroyed during the occupation of Paris in 1815. Although he resided in Paris, Aldini did not neglect his native city, which in these years was endowed with tree-lined ring roads and a public garden, and whose University became, along with Pavia, the most important in the Kingdom. Aldini devoted himself equally to the care of his own estate, refurbishing the family Palazzo on Strada Maggiore and commissioning Giuseppe Nadi to build a large Neoclassical villa on the site of the ancient Sanctuary of the Madonna del Monte.

Aldini made a significant contribution to the development of the kingdom's legal and administrative systems. A firm advocate of the annexation of the Marche, Rome and Umbria to the Kingdom of Italy, he never abandoned his original vision of a nation-state spanning the entire peninsula.

In 1814, after the fall of Napoleon, Aldini was sent together with Vincenzo Berni degli Antoni to the Congress of Vienna, to lobby on behalf of the Papal Legations. In 1814 he In May 1815, he was granted an audience with Metternich to beg that Ferrara, Ravenna and Bologna be annexed by the Austrian Empire. In May 1815, he presented to Metternich a plan for autonomous government for the Papal Legations.

Following the re-establishment of the Papal States, Aldini first retired to Milan and then returned to Bologna, where he spent the final years of his life in seclusion, managing the substantial properties he had accumulated over the years. Although he was distrusted by both the Austrian and papal governments, the latter appointed him to the commission overseeing works on the Reno. He died in Pavia on 30 September 1826 and was buried in Certosa di Bologna.

== Works ==
- Le arti poemetto per le felicissime nozze del nobile uomo signor conte Camillo Malvezzi colla nobile donna signora contessa Teresa Legnani al nobile ed eccelso signor senatore co. Girolamo Legnani Ferri, In Bologna, Nella Stamperia di S. Tommaso d'Aquino, 1772;
- Allegazione di fatto, e di ragione per li signori coeredi Agazzani contro sua eccellenza il sig. conte Filippo Giuseppe Marchisio, ed il sig. dottore Anton-Maria Goldoni nella causa di pretesa simulazione nell'appalto delle ducali finanze pendente avanti l'illustrissimo supremo consiglio di giustizia, In Modena, per gli eredi di Bartolomeo Soliani stampatori ducali, 1792;
- Rappresentanza stata fatta dalli cittadini Serbelloni, ed Aldini deputati straordinari del governo cisalpino al primo console della Repubblica francese aggiuntavi una lettera del cittadino Vincenzo Frignani modonese diretta ai medesimi deputati, Senza note tipografiche, 1802?
- Discorso pronunciato in Milano li 19 maggio 1805. a S.M.I. e R. Napoleone 1. dal sig. consigliere avvocato Antonio Aldini qual presidente del Collegio elettorale de' possidenti nella circostanza dell'inaugurazione al trono d'Italia di S.M., 1805?
- Osservazioni sul discorso pubblicato per le stampe Marsigli di Bologna col titolo Delle risaje e de' pessimi loro effetti. Vi ha nel fine il predetto discorso, Forlì, tipografia Casali, 1815;
- Un testamento inedito di Antonio Aldini, a cura di Nadia Penserini, Bologna, Azzoguidi, 1965, estratto da: "Bollettino del Museo del Risorgimento", anno 8., 1963.

== Sources ==
- Piscitelli, Enzo (1960). "ALDINI, Antonio". Dizionario Biografico degli Italiani (in Italian). Vol. 2: Albicante–Ammannati. Rome: Istituto dell'Enciclopedia Italiana. OCLC 883370.
- Zanolini, Antonio (1864). Antonio Aldini ed i suoi tempi: narrazione storica con documenti inediti o poco noti. Florence: Felice Le Monnier.
