= Giovanni Paradisi =

Italian mathematician, politician, and poet

Giovanni Paradisi (1760, Reggio nell'Emilia – 26 August 1826) was an Italian mathematician, politician and poet. His father was the poet and economist Count Agostino Paradisi.

== Biography ==
He was born in Reggio Emilia, to a poet father, more famous than wealthy. He studied at the University of Modena, and in 1783, he was named professor of geometry at the school. Giovanni and his father's selected works were published in Milan in 1828.

With the creation of the Cisalpine Republic under Napoleonic occupation, Giovanni was named one of the directors of the new government. But a dispute with general Brune led to his dismissal. With the return of Hapsburg government, he was imprisoned at the Fort of Cattaro. After the Battle of Marengo, and the defeat of the Austrians, he was recalled to government. He held a variety of positions, including president of the Senate in the years 1809, 1811, and 1812. He supported Napoleon's goals to claim the title of king of Italy, and as a reward was granted a title of count, and awards of the Iron Crown and Legion of Honor. He lobbied unsuccessfully to have Eugène de Beauharnais named as king of the North Italian republic. With Napoleon's fall, his main income was teaching mathematics.

== Works ==
- Proposizioni fisico-matematiche, Modena, 1779, in 4;
- Discorso recitato nella prima adunanza dell instituto italiano, in-4;
- Ricerche sulla vibrazione delle lamine elastiche, Bologne, 1806;
- Il vitalizio, commedia, Milano, 1822;

== Bibliography ==
- Carlo Capra, ‘La generosa nave’: appunti per una biografia di Giovanni Paradisi (la formazione e l’esordio politico), in Ricerche di storia in onore di F. Della Peruta, Milano, F. Angeli, 1996, vol. I, pp. 65–89
- Claudio Chiancone, Il circolo Paradisi e il “Poligrafo”, in Istituzioni e cultura in età napoleonica, a c. di E. Brambilla, C. Capra e A. Scotti, Milano, FrancoAngeli, 2008, pp. 232–250
