= Antonio Cagnoli =

Italian astronomer, mathematician, and diplomat

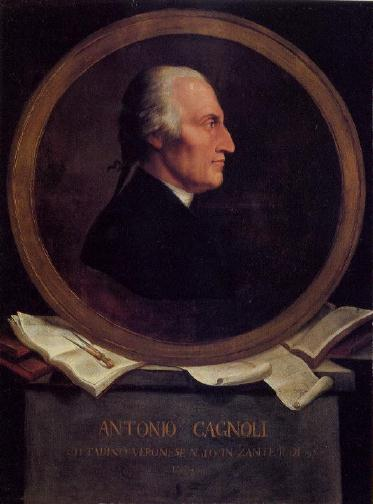
- Portrait of Antonio Cagnoli by Giuseppe Velasquez
- Born: 29 September 1743; Zakynthos, Republic of Venice
- Died: 6 August 1816 (aged 72); Verona, Kingdom of Lombardy–Venetia
- Occupations: Astronomer; Mathematician; Diplomat
- Known for: Cagnoli's Equation
- Parent(s): Ottavio Cagnoli and Elena Cagnoli (née Terzi)
- Scientific career
- Fields: Astronomy; Trigonometry
- Workplaces: Military Academy of Modena

President of the Accademia nazionale delle scienze
- In office 21 August 1797 – 6 August 1816
- Preceded by: Antonio Maria Lorgna
- Succeeded by: Paolo Ruffini

Antonio Cagnoli (29 September 1743, in Zakynthos – 6 August 1816, in Verona) was an Italian astronomer, mathematician and diplomat in the service of the Republic of Venice.

== Biography ==
Antonio Cagnoli was born in 1743, at Zakynthos, then belonging to the Republic of Venice. His father Ottavio was chancellor to the Venetian governor of the Ionian Islands. In 1772 he was appointed Secretary to the Venetian Ambassador in Spain, Marco Zeno. In 1775 he moved to Paris, where he lived for several years. A pupil of the French astronomer Jérôme Lalande, he collaborated in the Encyclopédie Méthodique. At Paris, he built an observatory furnished with the best astronomical instruments available. Back in Italy, in 1786 he built an observatory in Verona.

After the death of Antonio Maria Lorgna, in 1796, Cagnoli was appointed president of the Accademia nazionale delle scienze. He guided the Academy for the remaining 20 years of his life. The Cisalpine Republic, formed in northern Italy by Napoleon, transferred the Academy in Milan and the instruments of Cagnoli were moved to the Brera Astronomical Observatory. Cagnoli ended his scientific career as professor of Pure Mathematics at the Military Academy of Modena, where he taught until 1807. In his later years he moved back to his native Verona. He died in Verona on 6 August 1816. The asteroid 11112 Cagnoli discovered in 1995 bears his name.

== Works ==
In 1786, Cagnoli published his famous treatise Trigonometria Piana e Sferica (Plane and Spherical Trigonometry), translated into French by Nicolas Maurice Chompré and published in Paris with the title Trigonométrie rectiligne et sphérique in 1808. This work is considered a foundational text on trigonometry, and the French translation helped disseminate Cagnoli's work and the trigonometric formula named after him throughout Europe. In 1803, he published an authoritative star catalogue in the Proceedings of the Accademia nazionale delle scienze. The work was published separately in 1807, with tables for computing the aberration and nutation. Cagnoli's paper on the figure of the earth published in the 6th volume of the Proceedings of the Accademia nazionale delle scienze (1792) was translated into English by Francis Baily and published in London in 1819.

== Cagnoli's Equation ==
Cagnoli is best known for Cagnoli's equation, a formula relating the sides and angles of a spherical triangle. It's essentially a variation of the cosine rule for spherical triangles, particularly useful for calculations involving multiple angles and sides. Multiplying the first cosine rule by cos A gives
$$\cos a \cos A = \cos b \,\cos c \,\cos A + \sin b \,\sin c - \sin b \,\sin c \,\sin^2 A.$$
Similarly multiplying the first supplementary cosine rule by cos a yields
$$\cos a \cos A = -\cos B \,\cos C \,\cos a + \sin B \,\sin C - \sin B \,\sin C \,\sin^2 a.$$
Subtracting the two and noting that it follows from the sine rules that $\sin b \,\sin c \,\sin^2 A = \sin B \,\sin C \,\sin^2 a$ produces Cagnoli's equation
$$\sin b \,\sin c + \cos b \,\cos c \,\cos A = \sin B \,\sin C - \cos B \,\cos C \,\cos a$$
which is a relation between the six parts of the spherical triangle.

== Works in English translation ==
- Memoir on a New and Certain Method of Ascertaining the Figure of the Earth by Means of Occultations of the Fixed Stars. Translated by Francis Baily. London: Tailor. 1819.

== Bibliography ==
- Carlini, Francesco (1819). "Notizie sulla vita e sugli studi di Antonio Cagnoli" (PDF). Memorie della Società Italiana delle Scienze. XVIII (1): I–XIX.
- Farinella, Calogero (1997). "Da Montesquieu a Lalande: Antonio Cagnoli e una specola privata del Settecento". Studi Settecenteschi. 17: 227–264.
- Ciccone, S. (2023). "Cagnoli, Antonio". In Nicholson, P.D.; Bartlett, J.L. (eds.). Biographical Encyclopedia of Astronomers. New York, NY: Springer. doi:10.1007/978-1-0716-0738-1_100702-1.
