= Duke of Lodi =

The title of Conte di Magenta was created on 30 December 1619 for Don Luigi Melzi, of a Milanese patrician family. His descendant Gaspare, eighth Count, married Maria Teresa d'Eril, daughter and heiress of the Marchese de Fuente Sagrada, and their descendants adopted the name Melzi d'Eril. Francesco Melzi d'Eril, ninth Count, was made Vice-President of the Italian Republic under Napoleon Bonaparte in 1802, and Grand Chancellor of the Napoleonic Kingdom of Italy in 1805. On 20 December 1807 he was created Duca di Lodi by Napoleon in his capacity as King of Italy. The Duke was childless, and adopted as his heir his nephew Giovanni Francesco. On his death he was succeeded as tenth Count by his brother Luigi. The Emperor of Austria, as King of Lombardy–Venetia after the Congress of Vienna, recognised the comital title of Magenta in 1816, but did not recognise the Napoleonic dukedom of Lodi. However, Giovanni was given the title of Duca Melzi on 5 September 1818. His son Lodovico, twelfth Count of Magenta, reassumed the title of Duca di Lodi in 1859. The titles of Duca di Lodi and Conte di Magenta were recognised for his successors by ministerial decrees of the new Kingdom of united Italy dated 1890, 1913 and 1939. While there are still heirs to these titles, they were unrecognized after 1948 along with all other Italian noble titles.

== Conte di Magenta (1619) ==
- Luigi Melzi, 1st Conte di Magenta (1554–1629)
- Francesco Melzi, 2nd Conte di Magenta (1585–1630)
- Lodovico Melzi, 3rd Conte di Magenta (1594–1649)
- Sforza Melzi, 4th Conte di Magenta (1629–1688)
- Luigi Francesco Melzi, 5th Conte di Magenta (1631–1702)
- Sforza Lodovico Melzi, 6th Conte di Magenta (1662–1734)
- Francesco Melzi, 7th Conte di Magenta (1699–1777)
- Gaspare Melzi d'Eril, 8th Conte di Magenta (1719–1777)
- Francesco Melzi d'Eril, 9th Conte di Magenta, 1st Duca di Lodi (1753–1816)
- Luigi Melzi d'Eril, 10th Conte di Magenta (1755–1821)
- Giovanni Francesco Melzi d'Eril, 11th Conte di Magenta (1788–1832), he had succeeded as titular 2nd Duca di Lodi in 1816 and the titles thereafter remained united.

== Duca di Lodi (1807) ==
- Francesco Melzi d'Eril, 1st Duca di Lodi, 9th Conte di Magenta (1753–1816)
- Giovanni Francesco Melzi d'Eril, titular 2nd Duca di Lodi, 11th Conte di Magenta (1788–1832)
- Lodovico Melzi d'Eril, titular 3rd Duca di Lodi, 12th Conte di Magenta (1820–1886)
- Giovanni Melzi d'Eril, 4th Duca di Lodi, 13th Conte di Magenta (1825–1905)
- Francesco Melzi d'Eril, 5th Duca di Lodi, 14th Conte di Magenta (1849–1935)
- Benigno Melzi d'Eril, 6th Duca di Lodi, 15th Conte di Magenta (1879–1937)
- Lodovico Melzi d'Eril, 7th Duca di Lodi, 16th Conte di Magenta (1906–1994) by courtesy .
- Benigno Melzi d'Eril, 8th Duca di Lodi, 17th Conte di Magenta (born 1939) by courtesy

== Sources ==
- http://www.sardimpex.com/melzi/melzi2.htm%5B‍%5D
- http://www.sardimpex.com/melzi/melzi3.htm%5B‍%5D
