= Pietro Moscati =

Italian politician

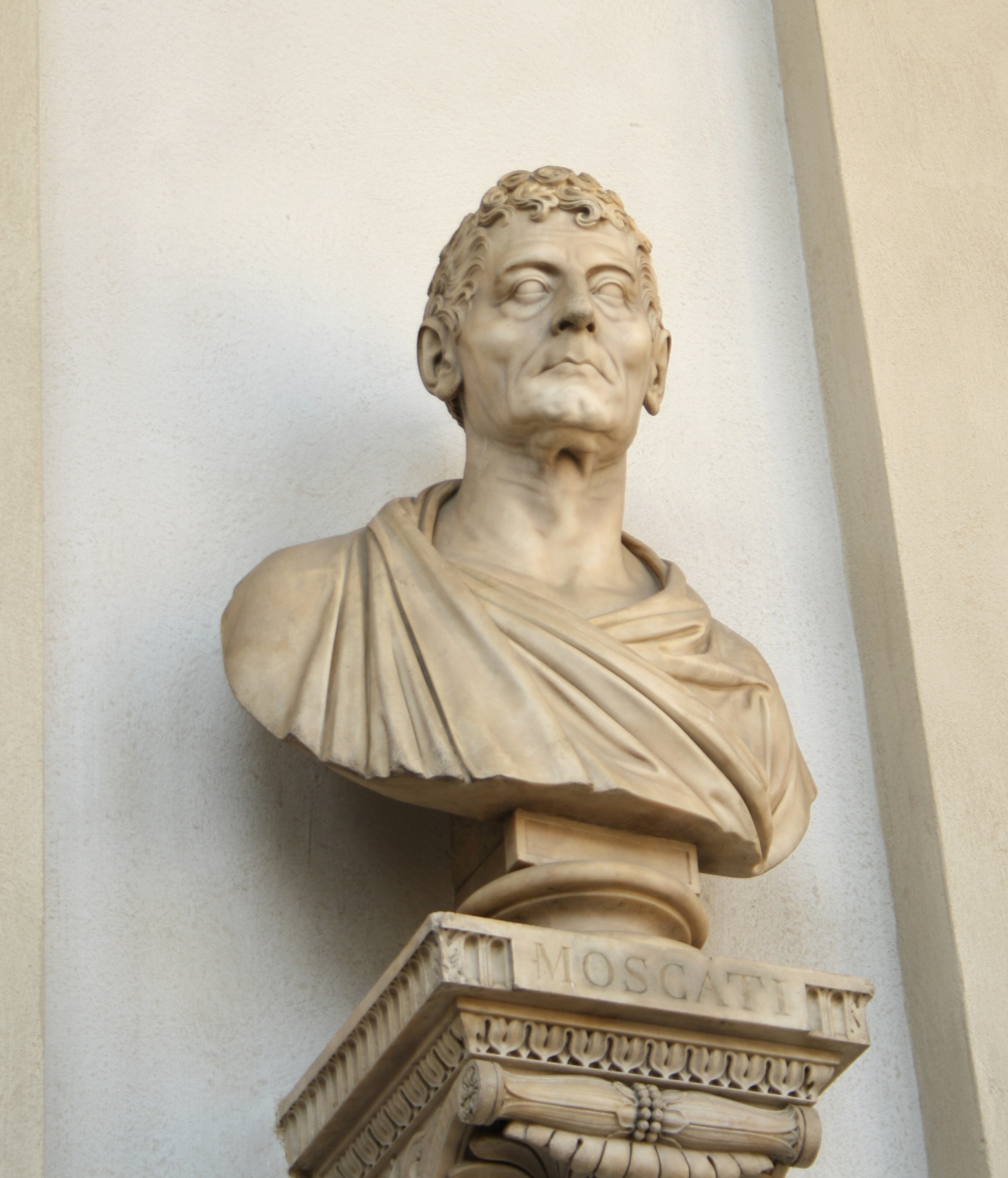
Pietro Moscato image

Pietro Moscati (June 1739, Milan - 19 January 1824, Milan) was an Italian medical doctor and politician.

== Life ==
=== Doctor ===
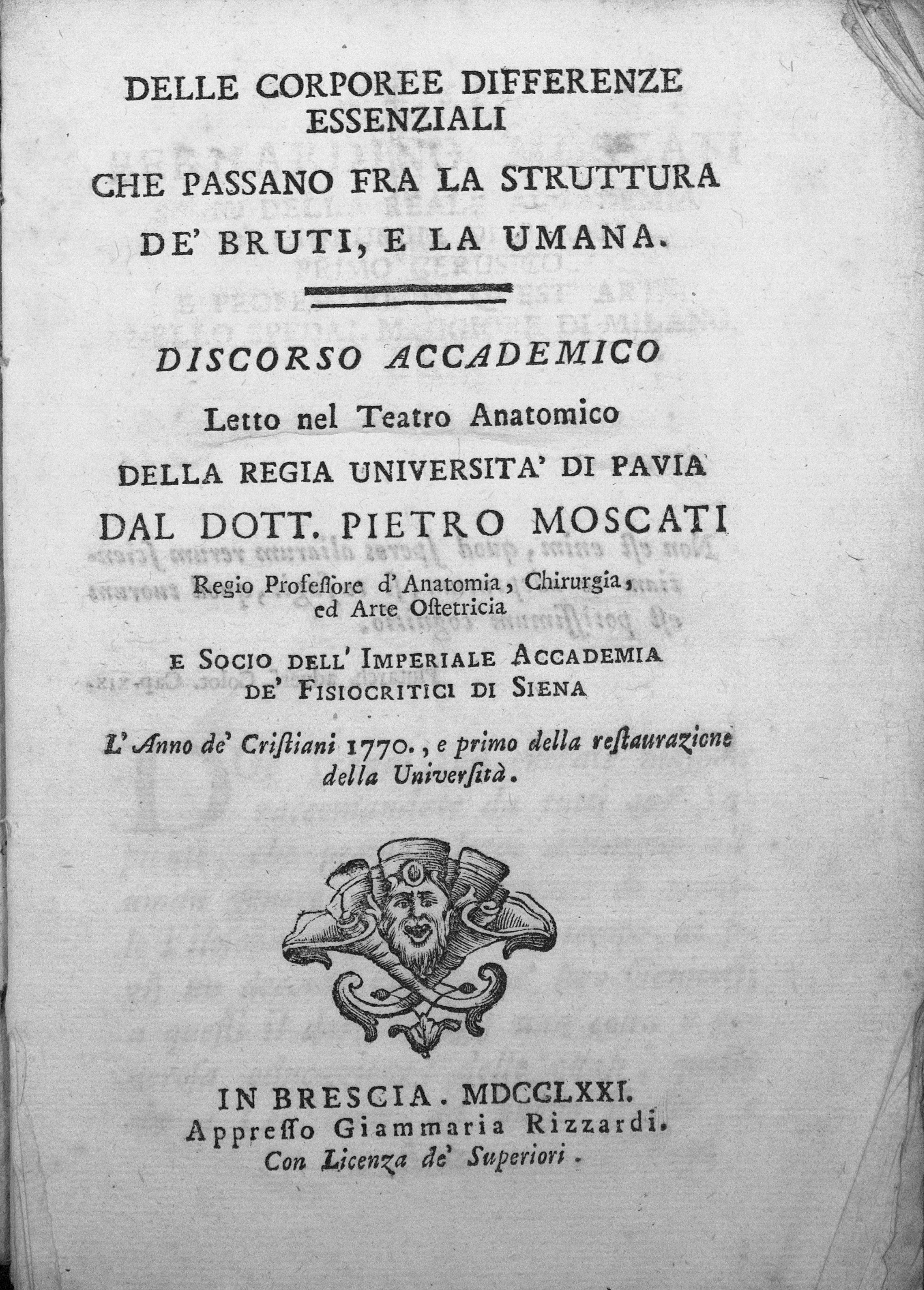
Moscati 1771

Born in Milan in 1739 Moscati Pietro was the son of a distinguished surgeon who, early on, inspired in him a taste for art.

He passed classical studies with distinction at the Jesuit college of St Alexander, and then went on to study medicine at the University of Pavia. After qualifying as a doctor, he attended the Universities of Padua, Bologna and Pisa, where he was taught by famous men such as Bertrandi, Molinelli and Nannoni.

Back in Milan, he was appointed chief surgeon at the Pia Casa di Santa Caterina alla Ruota, which served as a maternity hospital and hospital for children, then was given the role of the surgeon general hospital. His presence in this establishment was notable for two big improvements. In his first role, he established a birthing school, and in the second he started a surgical clinic school.

After being appointed professor at the University of Pavia, he became a close colleague of Volta and Angelo Bellani.

=== Revolution in Italy ===
When the French invaded Italy, Moscati did not conceal his partisan alignments. By 1797, he was elected member of National Congress of the Cisalpine Republic, formed by Napoleon. In 1798 Moscati joined the Executive Board of the Cisalpine Republic, of which he soon became president. The French Government then naturally became suspicious. They felt he wanted liberty and Moscati was suspected of wanting to establish the independence of his country. He was forced to leave public affairs, and to resign in the hands of the general, Marshal Guillaume Brune. When the reactionary forces of Austro-Russians regained Lombardy briefly in 1799, Moscati was arrested and taken with many of his fellow citizens to the fortress of Cattaro.
