= Antonio Maria Lorgna =

Italian mathematician and engineer (1735–1796)

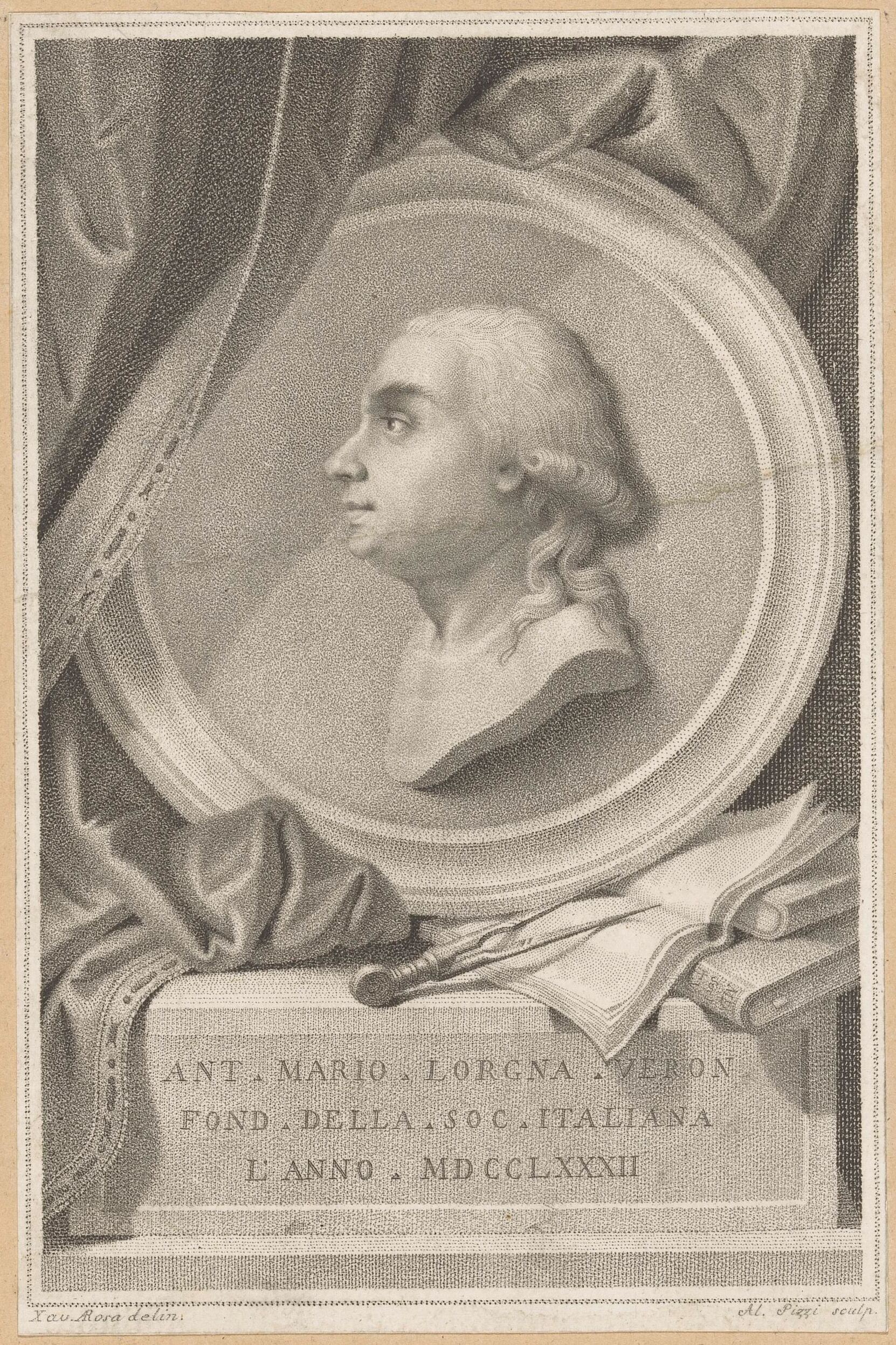
- Engraving by Saverio Dalla Rosa (1745-1821)
- Born: 18 October 1735; Cerea, Venetian Republic, now Italy
- Died: 28 June 1796 (aged 60); Verona, Venetian Republic, now Italy
- Education: University of Padua
- Known for: Founder of the Accademia nazionale delle scienze
- Scientific career
- Fields: Mathematics; Engineering

President of the Accademia nazionale delle scienze
- In office 1782–1796
- Preceded by: -
- Succeeded by: Antonio Cagnoli

Antonio Maria Lorgna (18 October 1735 – 28 June 1796) or Antonio Mario Lorgna (as he signed his works) was a mathematician from Italy in the 18th century, founder of the Accademia nazionale delle scienze.

== Life and work ==
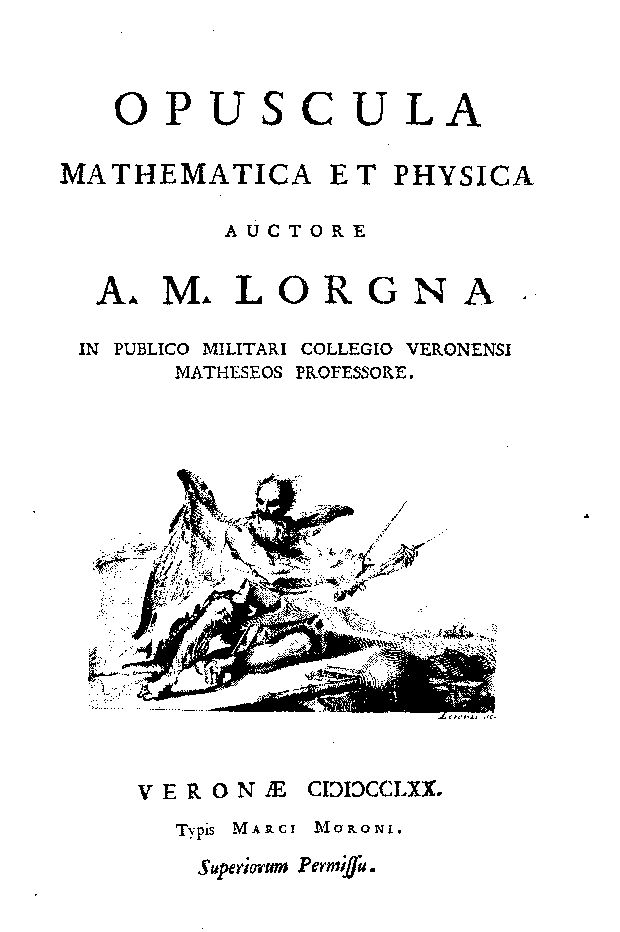
Opuscula mathematica et physica, 1770

Little is known about the first twenty years of Lorgna's life. He was the son of a cavalry officer of the Venetian army and in 1757 he was in Dalmatia probably following his father in his military duties (Dalmatia was at this time under Venetian rule). The general governor of Dalmatia, Alvise Contarini, knowing his abilities and versatility, appointed him as his secretary and interpreter.

Returned to Venice in 1759, Lorgna became a student at the University of Padua; he didn't graduate, but learned physics, astronomy and mathematics under Giovanni Poleni and Giovanni Alberto Colombo. In 1762 he enrolled in the Venetian army and went to Croatia for some time, then was appointed professor of mathematics in the military academy for engineers in Castelvecchio in Verona. Lorgna worked at the Military College of Castelvecchio for the rest of his career, teaching courses on trigonometry, mechanics, statics for construction, ballistics and hydraulics. From 1784 he was also the general governor of the college, attaining the military rank of Brigadier.

Lorgna never married. He died while the French army was occupying Verona. He is best known as the founder in 1782 of the Società Italiana delle Scienze detta dei XL, now the Accademia nazionale delle scienze, a leading research Italian institution.

== Works ==
Of 80 works, the following are major ones:

- Della graduazione de'termometri a mercurio e della rettificazione de'barometri semplici (1765)
- Della graduazione dei termometri a mercurio e della rettificazione dei barometri semplici (in Italian). Verona: Marco Moroni. 1765.
- De quibusdam maximis, & minimis: dissertatio statico-geometrica (1766)
- Dissertazione sopra il quesito: essendo le pressioni dell'acqua stagnante in ragione delle altezze... (1769)
- Opuscula mathematica et physica (1770)
- Del modo di migliorare l'aria di Mantova (in Italian). Verona: Marco Moroni. 1771.
- Dissertazione sopra il questio rinvenire il fondamento... (1771)
- Specimen de seriebus convergentibus (1775)
- De casu irreductibili tertii gradus et seriebus infinitis (1776)
- Saggi di statica e meccanica applicate alle arti (1782)
- Principi di geografia astronomico-geometrica (1789)
- Memorie intorno all'acque correnti di Anton-Mario Lorgna ... In Verona: nella Stamperia Moroni. 1777.
- Discorso intorno al riparare dalle inondazioni dell'Adige la città di Verona. [Verona]: nella stamperia Moroni. 1768.

== Bibliography ==
- Cerruti, L. (1994). "Dante's bones". In Kostas Gavroglu (ed.). The Sciences in the European Periphery During the Enlightenment. Dordrecht: Kluwer Academic Publishers. ISBN 0-7923-5548-2.
- Farinella, Calogero (1994). "Ricostruire la biblioteca di uno Scienziato: il caso di A. M. Lorgna". Nuncius. 9 (2): 739–758. doi:10.1163/182539184X01035. ISSN 0394-7394.
- Pepe, Luigi (2008). "Les milieux savants en Italie dans la deuxième moitié du 18e siècle". Dix-huitième siècle. 40 (1): 211–228. doi:10.3917/dhs.040.0211. ISSN 0070-6760.
