= Francesco Bertazzoli =

Italian prelate

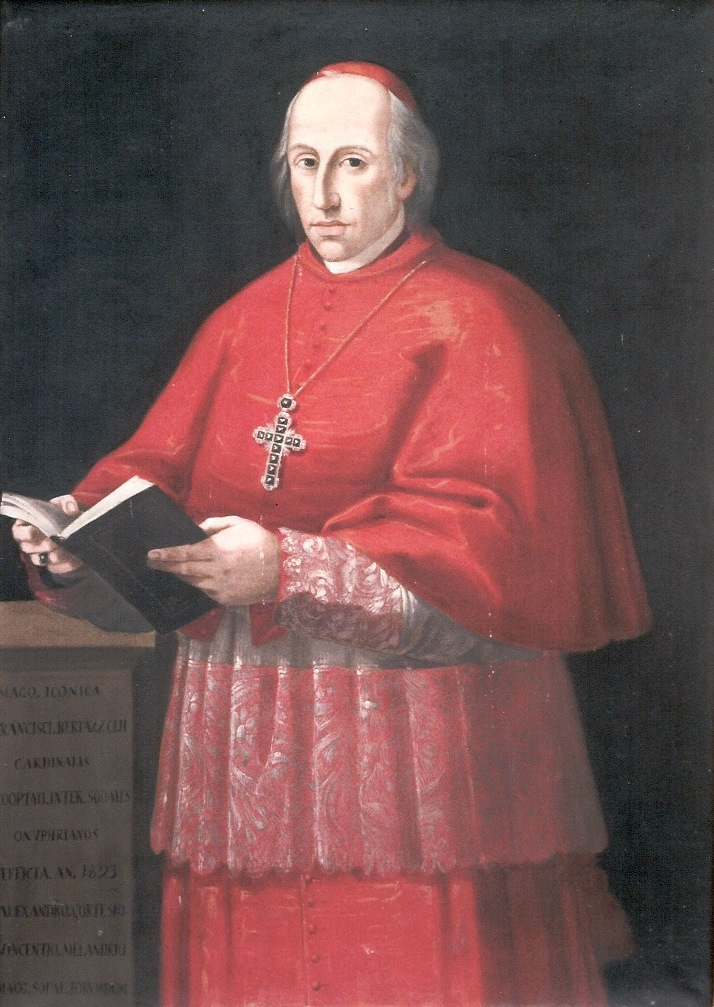

Francesco Bertazzoli (1 May 1754 – 7 April 1830) was an Italian prelate of the Catholic Church who was a longtime confidant of Pope Pius VII, who made him a cardinal in 1823.

== Biography ==
Francesco Bertazzoli was born in Lugo on 1 May 1754. Studied at the University of Bologna, where he earned a doctorate in utroque iure, both canon and civil law; and a doctorate in theology on October 20, 1778, He was ordained a priest in 1777. He taught theology at the seminary in Lugo. He wrote verses and published academic works, and he joined such scholarly associations as the Arcadia. He was appointed Lugo's vicar for external relations, which initiated his relationship with Barnaba Chiaramonti, then bishop of Imola and later Pope Pius VII, that would last his whole life. As vicar he was called upon to suppress the anti-French revolt in Lugo in 1796. He was a member of the Lugo regency in 1799 and later went on a mission to allied headquarters in Mantua.

In 1799 Bertazzoli provided funds to allow Barnaba Chiaramonti, who had exhausted his financial resources in aiding priests fleeing the French Revolution, to participate in the conclave of Venice. Chiaramonti emerged from the conclave as Pope Pius VII. Pope Pius appointed Bertazzoli papal almoner on 24 May 1802 and a titular archbishop, and later made him a canon of Santa Maria Maggiore. He accompanied the pope to Napoleon's coronation in Paris in December 1804.

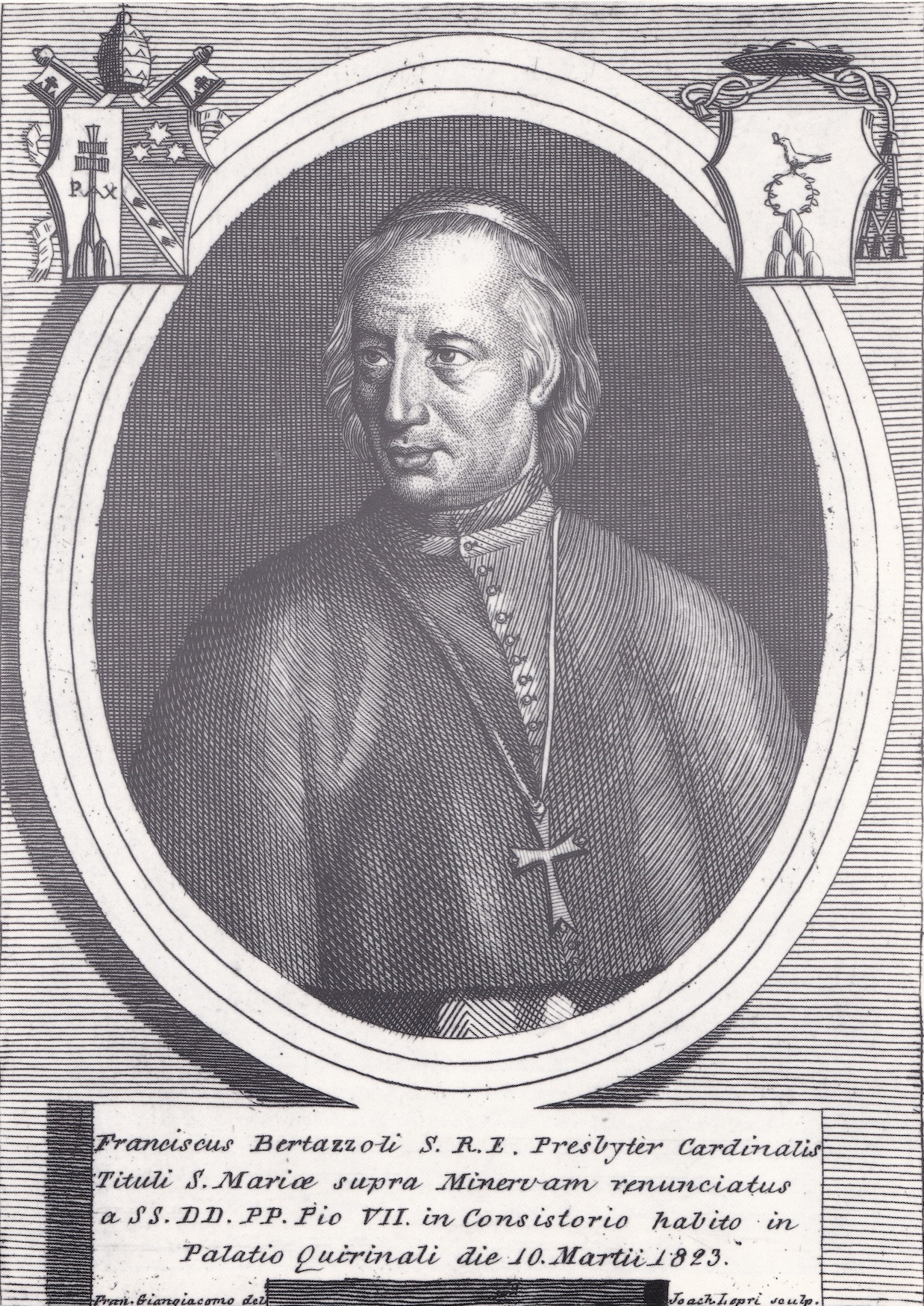

He retired to Lugo following the French invasion of 1808 and devoted himself exclusively to pastoral activity. He returned to Paris in the spring of 1811 to hear the French complaints against the papacy. Threatened and then arrested by the French, he was induced to persuade Pope Pius to sign the concordat of Fontainebleau that surrendered papal authority to the French emperor. For most of the time that Pope Pius was held captive by Napoleon's forces, Bertalozzi was his sole companion, joining him in May 1812 as he was transferred from Savona in northern Italy to Fontainebleau near Paris and on his return to Savona and then Rome in the spring of 1814.

Certain opponents succeeded in blocking his elevation to cardinal for years, though Pope Pius later said it had been his intention from the moment he was elected. Pope Pius made him a cardinal on 20 March 1823 with the title of Santa Maria sopra Minerva. In the conclave that followed the death of Pope Pius, he supported Cardinal Annibale della Genga, who was elected Pope Leo XII, who then appointed him prefect of the newly created Congregation of Studies on 30 December 1823. Exercising the right due his seniority in the College of Cardinals, he opted to become a cardinal bishop and on 15 December 1828 was confirmed to the see of Palestrina. He died in Rome on 7 April 1830.
