= Champeix =

- Commune
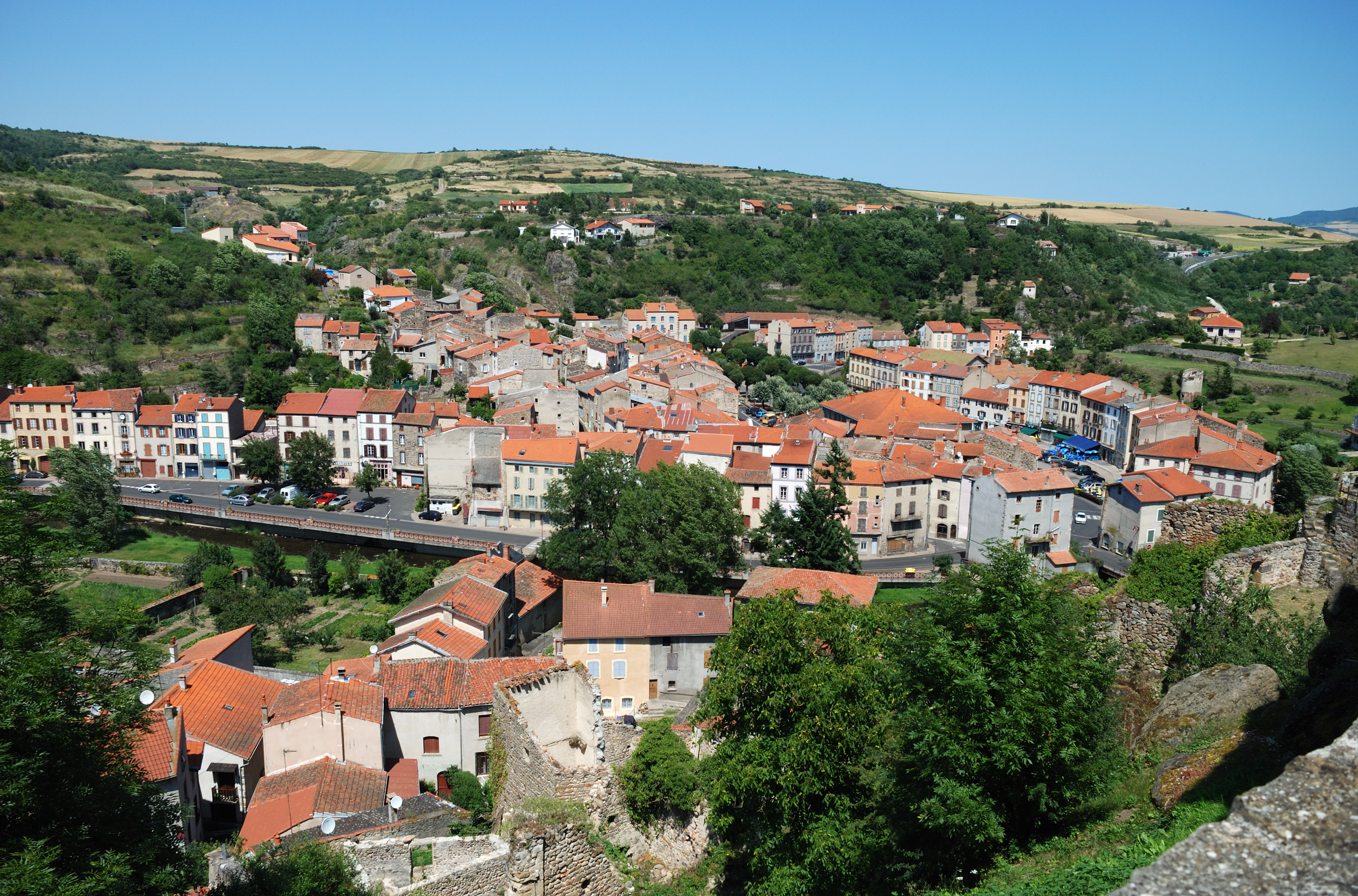
- A general view of Champeix

- Coat of arms
- Location of Champeix
- Location within France Location within Auvergne-Rhône-Alpes
- Coordinates: 45°35′22″N 3°07′47″E
- Country: France
- Region: Auvergne-Rhône-Alpes
- Department: Puy-de-Dôme
- Arrondissement: Issoire
- Canton: Le Sancy
- Intercommunality: Agglo Pays d'Issoire

Government
  - Mayor (2026–32): Roger-Jean Méallet
- Area^{1}: 12.12 km^{2} (4.68 sq mi)
- Elevation: 456 m (1,496 ft)
- Highest elevation: 760 m (2,490 ft)
- Lowest elevation: 428 m (1,404 ft)
- Population (2023): 1,422
  - Density: 117.3/km^{2} (303.9/sq mi)
- Time zone: UTC+01:00 (CET)
  - Summer (DST): UTC+02:00 (CEST)
- INSEE/Postal code: 63080 /63320
- ^{1} French Land Register data, which excludes lakes, ponds, glaciers > 1 km^{2} (0.386 sq mi or 247 acres) and river estuaries.

Champeix (French pronunciation: [ʃɑ̃pɛ]; Occitan: Champeilhs) is a commune in the Puy-de-Dôme department in Auvergne-Rhône-Alpes in central France.

== See also ==
- Communes of the Puy-de-Dôme department
