= Giuseppe Fenaroli Avogadro =

Italian politician

Giuseppe Fenaroli Avogadro (24 March 1760, in Brescia – 26 January 1825, in Brescia) was an Italian politician and friend of Napoleon I.
