= Giuseppe Abbamonte =

Italian politician

Giuseppe Abbamonte (1759–1818) was a Neapolitan statesman who became secretary-general of the Cisalpine Republic in 1798 and a member of the Executive Committee at Naples. Upon the restoration of the king in 1799, he moved to Milan where he continued working until 1805.

== Biography ==
While living in Naples, Abbamonte adhered to Jacobin ideals. The Jacobins were different politically from those who held power at the time: they were radical in the time of the French Revolution. In 1794, after joining a conspiracy, he was forced to flee to Oneglia. He then lived in Loano and Milan, where he published the Saggio leggi fondamentali dell'Italia libera (Essay on the fundamental laws of Italian liberty) in 1797. In Milan he founded the Giornale dei Patrioti italiani (Newspaper of the Italian patriots) and collaborated with Monitore italiano (Italian monitor).

In 1798 he became general inspector of the ministry of police of the Cisalpine Republic. Later, he was arrested for causing political conflicts.

After the proclamation of the Neapolitan Republic, despite his absence from the city, he was called up to be a part of the provisional government. He arrived in Naples in the second half of February 1799, and organized the court of justice. He was at first appointed Chairman of the Central Committee, and later of the Executive Committee.

He participated in the defence of the city against Sanfedist troops (Army of Holy Faith in our Lord Jesus Christ). This group was a peasant army that became popular and resisted the French republic. After the surrender, he was supposed to go to Toulon together with the other Neapolitan patriots, but the winning party broke the agreement and imprisoned them. Abbamonte was sentenced to death by the State Council but, because he surrendered, his punishment was changed to life imprisonment.

Abbamonte was liberated in 1801 and went to Milan, and returned to Naples permanently when Joseph Bonaparte became king of the city. In Naples, he held important roles in the magistracy and was appointed state counsellor by Joachim Murat. After the restoration, he remained in the city, under the reign of Ferdinando, and was appointed as counsellor of the Supreme Court of Justice.
