= Vincenzo Berni degli Antoni =

Italian jurist and writer

- Born: April 25, 1747; Bologna, Papal States
- Died: 4 March 1828 (aged 80); Bologna, Papal States
- Occupations: Jurist; University teacher; Intellectual; Poet

Academic background
- Education: University of Bologna

Academic work
- Era: Age of Enlightenment
- Institutions: University of Bologna
- Influenced: Carlo Pepoli

Vincenzo Berni degli Antoni (25 April 1747 – 4 March 1828) was an Italian jurist and writer.

== Biography ==
Vincenzo Berni degli Antoni was born in Bologna on 25 April 1747. His father, Francesco Berni degli Antoni, was an eminent jurist.

Vincenzo studied law in the university of his native city, with the reputation of a promising young man, and soon after taking his degree was appointed professor of civil law. From this post he was promoted to be auditor to the papal legates Giovanni Andrea Archetti and Ippolito Antonio Vincenti.

In 1798, he was exiled for refusing to take the oath of allegiance to the republican government established by the French in the Papal States.

In 1799, he was named a member of the regency established at Rome by the Austrians. He submitted to the government established by the French on their second invasion; he accepted the appointment of commissary-general of finance of the Cispadane Republic, and after the creation of the Kingdom of Italy was nominated by Napoleon procurator for the king in the court of Cassation, and a knight of the Order of the Iron Crown.

On the re-establishment of the papal government, Antoni was offered the appointment of president of the court of appeal by Pope Pius VII, but declined it on account of his age and infirmities. He died in Bologna in 1828.

Antoni published many Latin and Italian essays, some legal pamphlets, comedies and poems, and was member of several Italian academies, most notably the Pontifical Academy of Arcadia.

== Works ==
- Epigrammi alla egregia signora Angelica Kauffman celebre pittrice. Parma: Giambattista Bodoni. 1803.
- De vita Ioannis Donati centensis commentariolum. Bononiae: ex tipographia Iosephi Lucchesinii. 1815.
- Versi. Parma: Stamperia imperiale. 1816.
- Di qual modo usar si debba delle acque porrettane. Canto Bernesco. Imola: Tipografia del Seminario. 1820.
- L'Adulatore. Commedia in tre atti. Bologna: presso Annesio Nobili. 1822.
- Disamina degli Elementi di zoologia del signor professore abbate Camillo Ranzani. Forlì: Stamperia Casali. 1820.
- Osservazioni intorno alla tragedia di Sofocle intitolata Edipo re e risposta alle critiche di alcuni autori. Bologna: Tipografia Felsinea di Romano Turchi Battarra. 1823.
- Sulla mitologia scandinava del sig. abate Giovan Battista Bruni. Dal Giornale Arcadico volume di agosto. Roma: Stamperia del Giornale Arcadico, presso Antonio Boulzaler. 1825.
- Commedie del cavaliere avvocato Vincenzo Berni degli Antonj. Bologna: presso Turchi, Veroli e Comp. 1825.
- Osservazioni al voto consultivo del signor avvocato Giovanni Vicini nella causa di simultanea successione di cristiani, e di ebrei alla intestata eredità di un loro congiunto dell'avvocato Vincenzo Berni degli Antonj ... Bologna: dai tipi del Nobili e Comp. 1827.
- Voto politico-legale per la città di Bologna. Parigi. 1831.

== Bibliography ==
- Salvagnoli Marchetti, Giuseppe (1834). "Berni degli Antoni (Vincenzo)". Biografia degli Italiani illustri nelle scienze: lettere ed arti del secolo XVIII. e de' contemporanei compilata da letterati Italiani di ogni provincia. Vol. 1. Venice: dalla Tipografia di Alvisopoli. pp. 40–41.
- Craveri, Piero (1967). "BERNI DEGLI ANTONI, Vincenzo". Dizionario Biografico degli Italiani (in Italian). Vol. 9: Berengario–Biagini. Rome: Istituto dell'Enciclopedia Italiana. ISBN 978-88-12-00032-6.
