= Louis-Mathias, Count de Barral =

French church figure

Louis-Mathias-Joseph de Barral
- Archbishop of Tours
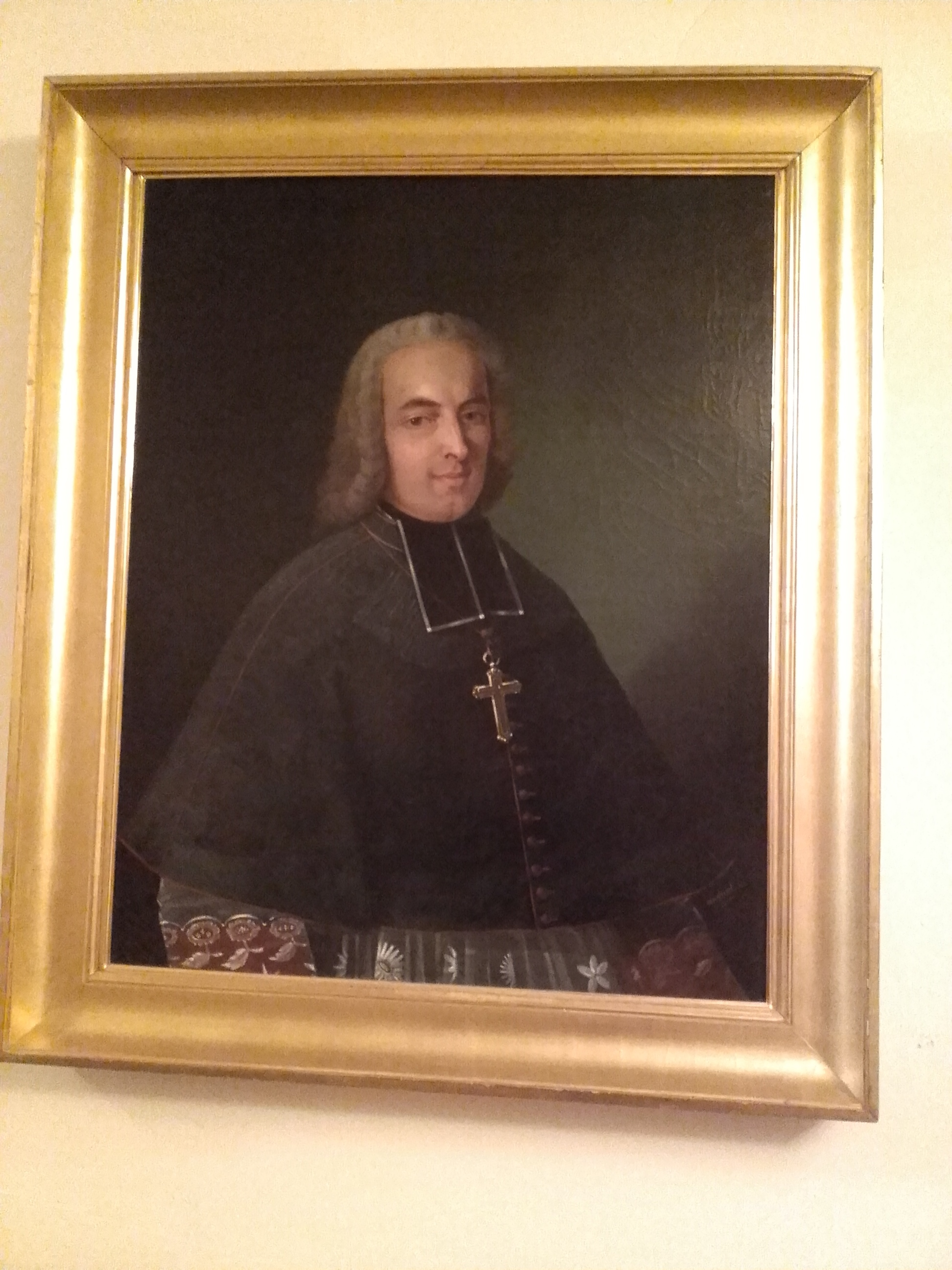
- Church: Catholic Church
- Archdiocese: Archdiocese of Tours
- In office: 1 February 1805 – 1 September 1815
- Predecessor: Jean de Dieu-Raymond de Cucé de Boisgelin
- Successor: Jean-Baptiste du Chilleau
- Previous posts: Bishop of Meaux (1802-1805); Bishop of Troyes (1790-1801); Titular Bishop of Isauropolis (1788-1790); Coadjutor Bishop of Troyes (1788-1790)

Orders
- Consecration: 5 October 1788 by Jean de Dieu-Raymond de Cucé de Boisgelin

Personal details
- Born: 26 April 1746 Grenoble, Dauphiné, Kingdom of France
- Died: 7 June 1816 (aged 70)

Louis-Mathias, Count de Barral (26 April 1746 – 7 June 1816) was a French church figure.

== Biography ==
He was born at Grenoble and was educated for the priesthood at the seminary of St. Sulpice, in Paris. In 1774–1775 he was the Conclavist of Cardinal de Luynes in the papal election that produced Pope Pius VI (Braschi). He was made secretary, then coadjutor, and in 1790, successor, to his uncle, the Bishop of Troyes. In 1790, he refused to take the oath to the civil constitution of the clergy, explaining his views and those of the Pope to the electors of his diocese in a pamphlet in the form of a letter. He then withdrew from France to Konstanz in Switzerland and later to England.

In 1801 he returned home, and wrote a forceful pamphlet on the subject of bishops resigning their offices at the request of Pope Pius VII. Under the new concordat between France and the Holy See, Barral was appointed to govern the Diocese of Meaux, and in 1805 was promoted to the Archbishopric of Tours. During the long and harassing negotiations which Napoleon carried on with Pope Pius VII, while the latter was virtually a prisoner at Savona and Fontainebleau, Archbishop de Barral acted frequently as the emperor's intermediary. He was afterwards appointed almoner to the Empress Josephine, and he pronounced her funeral oration. Later still he was named a Senator and a Count of the Empire.

On the downfall of Napoleon, the archbishop took his seat in the Chamber of Peers under Louis XVIII, and in the government of the "Hundred Days", which followed on the return of Napoleon from Elba, he still retained his political position. On the second restoration of the Bourbons, however, he was obliged to resign, and from this time till his death, which occurred in the following year, he confined himself entirely to the administration of his archdiocese.

== Works ==
His writings include:

- Fragments relatifs à l'histoire ecclésiastique des premières années du XIXe siècle (Paris, 1814)
- Défense des libertés de l'église gallicane et de l'assemblée du clergé de France tenue en 1682, ou réfutation de plusieurs ouvrages publiés récemment en Angleterre sur l'infaillibilité du Pape (Paris, 1817)

== Sources ==
- Biographie des hommes vivants (in French). Vol. Tome premier. Paris: L.G. Michaud. 1816. pp. 210–212.
- Michaud, Louis-Gabriel, ed. (1834). Biographie universelle, ancienne et moderne: supplément (in French). Vol. Tome 57. Paris: Chez L.-G. Michaud, Libraire-Éditeur. pp. 184–186.
