= Antonio Codronchi =

Italian priest and archbishop

- Archbishop of Ravenna
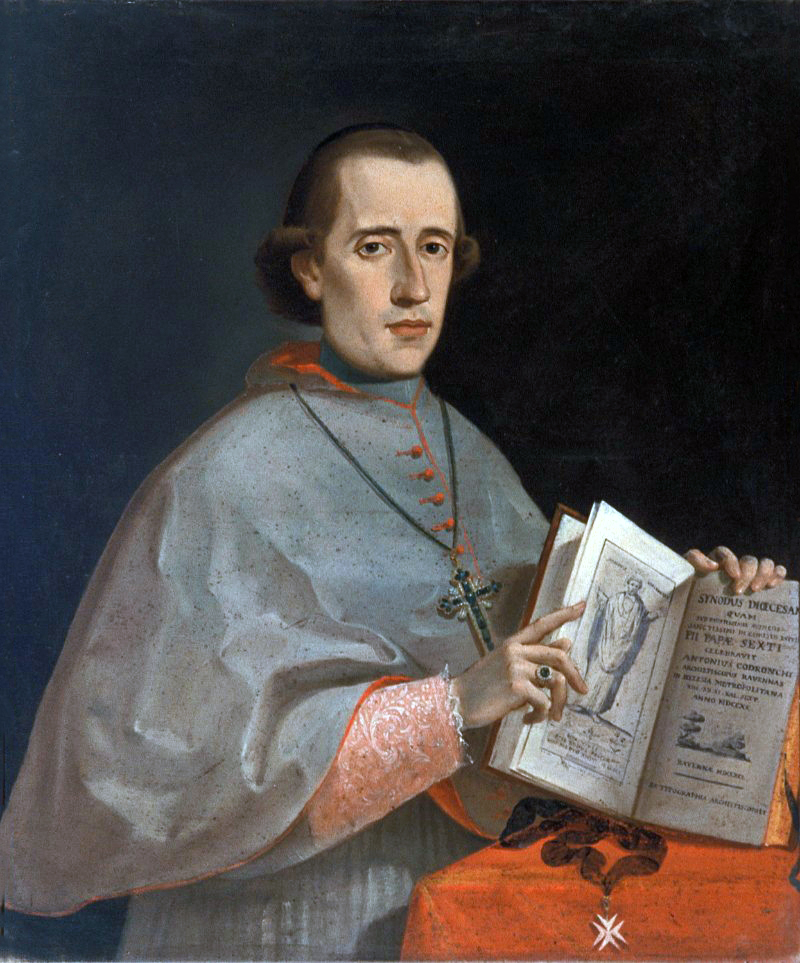
- Church: Catholic Church
- Archdiocese: Archdiocese of Ravenna
- In office: 14 February 1785 – 22 January 1826
- Predecessor: Antonio Cantoni
- Successor: Clarissimo Falconieri Mellini

Orders
- Ordination: 21 September 1771
- Consecration: 8 May 1785 by Barnaba Chiaramonti

Personal details
- Born: 5 August 1748 Imola, Romagna, Papal States
- Died: 22 January 1826 (aged 77) Ravenna, Legation of Ravenna, Papal States

Antonio Codronchi (5 August 1746, Imola - 22 January 1826, Ravenna) was an Italian priest and archbishop.

== Life ==
He served as papal nuncio to Turin from 1778 until he was made archbishop of Ravenna on 8 May 1785. He pushed for the Peace of Tolentino in 1797 and played a role in the Consulte de Lyon in 1802. When Napoleon I made himself king of Italy, he made Codronchi grand-almoner, senator and grand-dignitary of the Order of the Iron Crown. After Napoleon's fall, he backed the Bourbons.

== Bibliography ==
- Giuseppe Pignatelli, Dizionario Biografico degli Italian, vol. 26, 1982, p. CODRONCHI, Antonio
