= Jean-Baptiste Duvoisin =

French Roman Catholic priest and writer

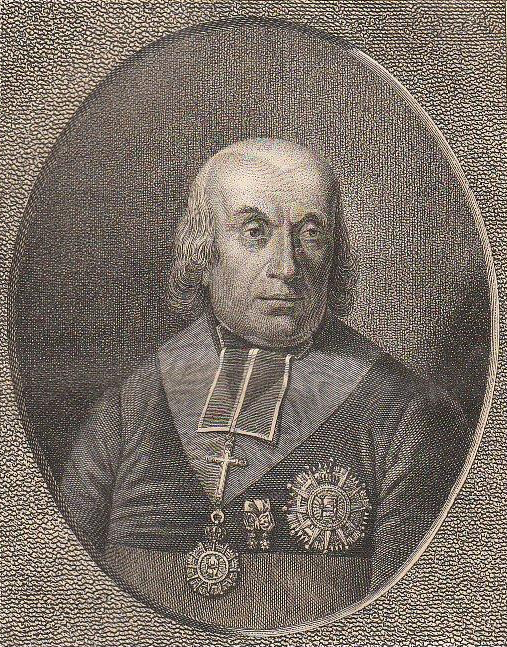

Jean-Baptiste Duvoisin (19 October 1744 – 9 July 1813) was a Roman Catholic priest, theologian and writer, who was Bishop of Nantes from 1802 until his death in 1813. He was praised by the Napoleon I for being, in theological matters, "a torch of which he did not wish to lose sight," and was often consulted by the Emperor on religious questions.

Jean-Baptiste Duvoisin was born in Langres, France on 19 October 1744. He received a bachelor's degree from the Sorbonne in Paris and soon joined the university as a professor of theology. The Bishop of Laon later chose him as Vicar-General. During the Revolution, he was exiled in 1792 as a refractory priest, but returned to France following the Concordat of 1801, negotiated between Napoleon Bonaparte and Pius VII, which re-established the Catholic Church in France.

He soon attracted the attention of the first consul, who appointed him bishop of Nantes on 5 July 1802 and gave him his full confidence. He was one of the four bishops sent by Napoleon to reside near Pius VII during the Pope's captivity at Savona and Fontainebleau, with the aim of persuading the Pope to reconcile himself with the Emperor. Napoleon I also appointed him an Almoner to the Empress Marie-Louise. Duvoisin died on 9 July 1813 at the age of 68. In 1856 a street was named after him in Nantes.

== Writings ==
He was the author of several works defending the Catholic Religion against the many hostile attacks made upon it at the time, such as the writings of Baron d'Holbach.

- L'Autorité du Nouveau Testament, 1775
- L'Autorité des livres de Moïse, 1778
- Essai sur la Religion naturelle, 1780
- Démonstration évangélique, 1802
- Essai sur la Tolérance, 1805.

== Bibliography ==
- J.-P. Migne (ed.). Oeuvres complètes de Du Voisin, évêque de Nantes, réunies pour la première fois en collection, classées selon l'ordre logique, et augmentées d'une foule de pièces conservées dans les archives de la Cathédrale de Nantes, suivies des oeuvres inédites. Paris: Mighe 1856.
