= Constitution of the Cisalpine Republic (1797) =

Legal document

The Constitution of the Cisalpine Republic (Italian: Costituzione della Repubblica Cisalpina), was the first constitution of the Cisalpine Republic, a sister republic of France under Napoleon Bonaparte, roughly comprising the modern-day northern regions of Lombardy and Emilia-Romagna. It came into effect on 20 messidor V (8 July 1797).

It established a directorial republic, which effectively was a French puppet. The parliament had an upper house of 60 aldermen and a lower house of 120 members, both appointed by Napoleon. The territory was divided in French-like departments and municipalities. Every noble title was abolished.

This constitution did not survive even a year since Napoleon left Italy towards Egypt in 1798.
