= Francesco Melzi d'Eril =

Italian politician and patriot (1753–1816)

Francesco Melzi d'Eril Duke of Lodi
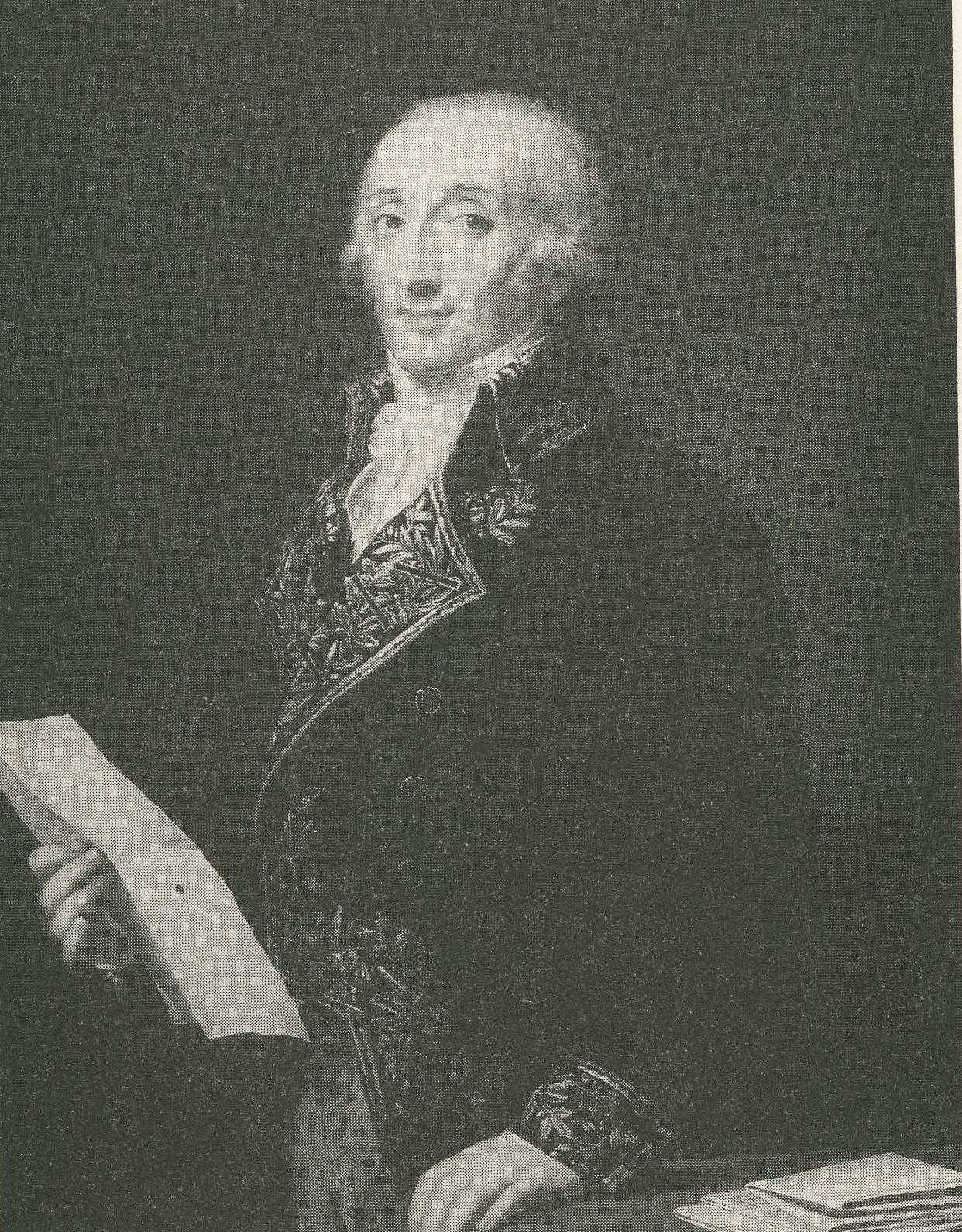
- Portrait by Andrea Appiani

Vice President of the Italian Republic
- In office 26 January 1802 – 17 March 1805
- President: Napoleon Bonaparte
- Preceded by: Office established
- Succeeded by: Eugène de Beauharnais (as Viceroy of Italy)

Grand Chancellor of the Kingdom of Italy
- In office 1805–1814
- Monarch: Napoleon Bonaparte
- Preceded by: Office established

Personal details
- Born: 6 March 1753 Milan, Duchy of Milan
- Died: 16 January 1816 (aged 62) Bellagio, Lombardy–Venetia

Francesco Melzi d'Eril, Duke of Lodi, Count of Magenta (6 March 1753 – 16 January 1816) was an Italian politician and patriot, serving as vice-president of the Napoleonic Italian Republic (1802–1805). He was a consistent supporter of the Italian unification ideals that would lead to the Italian Risorgimento shortly after his death.

== Early life and education ==
Francesco Melzi d'Eril was born to Gaspare and Marianna Teresa d'Eril in 1753. Despite the House of Melzi d'Eril being one of the prominent families in the Milanese aristocracy, their wealth had been compromised. This was mostly due to Francesco's grandfather Francesco Saverio Melzi, who had fought in the War of the Austrian Succession along with the Spanish, thus falling in disgrace when Empress Maria Theresa had re-established her control over her possessions in Lombardy. As a consequence of this situation, Francesco Melzi d'Eril was raised by his uncle.

Francesco's uncle had him educated by the Jesuits, first at the "Collegio dei Nobili" in Brera and then at the "Scuole Palatine", both in Milan. In the latter institute, Francesco met scientist Ruggero Giuseppe Boscovich, who would thereafter be one of his best friends. In 1773, as a consequence of Emperor Joseph II's Enlightenment-influenced reforms, religious schools lost the right to confer degrees, so Francesco never graduated.

== Career ==
Despite his family's situation, Melzi d'Eril had the opportunity to frequent exclusive Milanese circles, where he met prominent Lombard Enlightenment thinkers such as Pietro Verri, Cesare Beccaria, Giuseppe Parini, and Ippolito Pindemonte. He also had the opportunity to travel abroad and become knowledgeable about the emerging, Enlightenment-influenced European political systems as well as the English parliamentary system. In this context, he developed a liberalist view and sympathized with the French Revolution, although this was later mitigated by his disapproval of the radical, anti-religious developments the Revolution would bring about. He also thoroughly embraced the cause of the Italian unification.

=== Descent of Napoleon in Italy ===
Melzi d'Eril's attitude towards Napoleon was as mixed as that he had had towards the French Revolution. When Napoleon began his Italian campaign, and entered Milan, Melzi d'Eril first supported the new rule, participating in the government of the Cisalpine Republic. Later on, when he realized that Napoleon had no interest in the unity of Italy, Melzi d'Eril retired and eventually moved abroad.

After the Battle of Marengo (1800), Melzi was invited to France to participate in the definition of the new political order for Italy. When the Italian Republic was founded, with Napoleon as the head of state, Melzi d'Eril was named vice-president. In the three years of the Italian Republic, Melzi d'Eril largely contributed to the development of the Republic as well as the renewal of the city of Milan, which was chosen as the capital of the new kingdom. Nevertheless, when the Kingdom of Italy was proclaimed in 1805, Napoleon chose Eugène de Beauharnais as his governor, and Melzi d'Eril was somehow set aside from the new government. As a compensation of sorts, he was made Duke of Lodi. He thus retired but remained a strong supporter of the autonomy of Italy and a frank critic of the Napoleonic rule.

== Later years ==
In 1815, Milan fell under Austrian rule. Melzi d'Eril was cautious in his relationships with the Austrian Empire, avoiding direct confrontation but also refusing to bow to the new rulers. It is notable, for example, that in 1815 he refused to welcome Austrian emissary Annibale Sommariva who had been sent on a diplomatic mission to meet him in his house in Bellagio.

Melzi d'Eril died on 16 January 1816 at the age of 63, in his house in Milan (Palazzo Melzi d'Eril), while the Austrian Emperor was visiting the city. The newspaper did not report on his death, for fear that the news might cause uprisings in Milan while the Emperor was there. The very day of his death, his house was sealed by the police, and his documents were later sequestrated and brought to Vienna.

The funeral was delayed until 28 March, but it was solemn and largely participated by the population. His body was buried in Villa Melzi d'Eril, his villa in Bellagio, on Lake Como.
