= Five star =

Five star, 5 star or ***** may refer to:

== Quality grading system ==
- Five star grade in a Star (classification) system, such as for films, TV shows, restaurants, and hotels
  - Hotel rating
  - Restaurant rating
  - UEFA stadium categories

== Arts and entertainment ==
=== Music ===
- Five Star, a British pop/R&B group, formed in 1983
  - Five Star (album), by Five Star (1990)
- The Five Stars, a Samoan musical group
- The Five Stars, a 1950s American vocal group, with "Atom Bomb Baby" featured in The Atomic Cafe
- Five-Star (album), by Yuki (2007)
- Five Stars (Myname album), 2014
- Five Stars (Higher Brothers album)
- "5 Star" (Yo Gotti song) (2009)
- 5-Star (Stray Kids album) (2023)

=== Film, radio and television ===
- Five Star (film), a 2002 Indian Tamil film
- Five Star Production, a Thai film production company
- 5Star, a UK TV channel owned by Channel 5
- The Five Star Stories, a series of 1986 manga
- Five Star Thieves, a 1994 Egyptian film

=== Computer games ===
- SSI's Five Star series of wargames, of which Panzer General was the first

== Businesses and organisations ==
=== Politics ===
- Five Star Movement, a political party in Italy
- Flag of China, a five-star red flag

=== Businesses ===
- Five Star Bank (disambiguation), several American commercial banks
- Five Star Bus Company, in the Philippines
- Five Star Publishing, the fiction imprint of Gale (publisher)
- Five Star Service Guarantee, a customer service campaign of U.S. Bancorp
- Five Star school supplies, a sub-brand of the Mead division of ACCO Brands

== Places ==
- Five Star Island, Bermuda
- Five Star Trail, a trail alongside the Southwestern Pennsylvania Railroad, U.S.

== Sport ==
- 5 Star Wrestling, a Scottish professional wrestling company
- Cinco Estrellas, a former Nicaraguan baseball team

== Other uses ==
- Five-star rank, a very senior military rank
- 5 Star (chocolate), a chocolate bar produced by Cadburys
- Five Star Krishna, Indian actor

== See also ==
- Five-pointed star
- V Star (disambiguation)
- Flag of China, also known as the Five-star Red Flag
- "Five stars rising in the East" armband, an Eastern Han (25–220) to Western Jin (265–316) era Sichuan brocade armband
