= Pakistani 5-rupee coin =

Denomination of Pakistan currency

5 rupee
- Pakistan
- Value: Rs. 5
- Mass: 3 g
- Diameter: 18.5 mm
- Composition: Copper-Zinc-Nickel
- Years of minting: 2002–present

Obverse
- Design: Lettering of "Islami Jamhoria Pakistan" at top, crescent moon and north-west facing five-pointed star at centre in ascending position. Issue year at bottom between two upward-curving wheat sprigs. Edge patterned with small beads.
- Designer: State Bank of Pakistan

Reverse
- Design: Surrounding floral wreath interrupted by points of central five-pointed star, "5" and "Rupee" in Urdu at star's heart. Periphery uniformly bordered with beading pattern.
- Designer: State Bank of Pakistan

The Pakistani 5-rupee coin (Rs. 5) is a denomination of the Pakistani rupee.

The 5-rupee coin is an alloy comprising 79 percent copper, 20 percent zinc, and 1 percent nickel. It weighs 3 grams and measures 18.5 mm in diameter.

== History ==
The 5-rupee coin was introduced in December 2002 by the State Bank of Pakistan.

== Obverse ==
On the obverse, it presents a design featuring a waxing crescent moon and a north-west facing five-pointed star in an ascending position. The phrase "Islami Jamhoria Pakistan" is inscribed at the top, with the issue year marked at the bottom, located between two upward-curving wheat sprigs. The coin's edge is adorned with a pattern of small beads.

== Reverse ==
The reverse side is surrounded by a floral wreath that is interrupted by the points of a central five-pointed star. The coin's face value, displayed as "5" and "Rupee" in Urdu script, is positioned at the heart of the star. The coin's periphery is uniformly bordered with a beading pattern.
