= V Star =

V Star or V-star may refer to:

== Businesses ==
- VStar Entertainment Group, an American family entertainment production company
- V Star Multimedia, division of Virgin Megastores
- V-Star Creations, an Indian clothing manufacturer

== Science and technology ==
- Vstar, a subsatellite of SELENE Japanese lunar orbiter spacecraft
- Star of luminosity class V, a Stellar classification

== Transport ==
- Star Motorcycles V star models
- Stolp SA-900 V-Star, an American aerobatic homebuilt biplane

== See also ==
- Five star (disambiguation)
