= Five Star Bank =

Five Star Bank may refer to:

- Five Star Bank (California)
- Five Star Bank (New York)
