= Stella d'Italia =

Star symbolizing Italy for many centuries

Stella d'Italia ("Star of Italy"), also known as Stellone d'Italia ("Great Star of Italy")

The Stella d'Italia ("Star of Italy"), popularly known as Stellone d'Italia ("Great Star of Italy"), is a five-pointed white star, which has symbolized Italy for many centuries. It is the oldest national symbol of Italy, since it dates back to Graeco-Roman mythology when Venus, associated with the West as an evening star, was adopted to identify the Italian Peninsula. From an allegorical point of view, the Stella d'Italia metaphorically represents the shining destiny of Italy.

In the early 16th century it began to be frequently associated with Italia turrita, the national personification of the Italian peninsula. The Stella d'Italia was adopted as part of the emblem of Italy in 1947, where it is superimposed on a steel cogwheel, all surrounded by an oak branch and an olive branch.

== Symbolic value ==
Emblem of Italy, with the central Stella d'Italia

From an allegorical point of view, the Star of Italy metaphorically represents the shining destiny of Italy. Its unifying value is equal to that of the flag of Italy. In 1947, the Stella d'Italia was inserted at the center of the emblem of Italy, which was designed by Paolo Paschetto and which is the iconic symbol identifying the Italian State.

The Italian Star is also recalled by some honors. The Italian Star is recalled by the Colonial Order of the Star of Italy, decoration of the Kingdom of Italy which was intended to celebrate the Italian Empire, as well as by the Order of the Star of Italian Solidarity, the first decoration established by Republican Italy, which was replaced in 2011 by the Order of the Star of Italy, second civil honorary title in importance of the Italian State.

The Star of Italy is also recalled by the stars worn on the collars of Italian military uniforms and appears on the figurehead of the Italian Navy. In the civil sphere, the Italian Star is the central symbol of the emblem of the Club Alpino Italiano.

== History ==
=== From ancient Greece to the Roman era ===
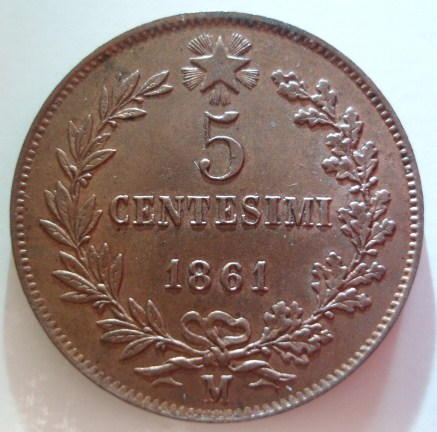
The Stella d'Italia on the first coins of a united Italy

The symbolism of a star associated with Italy first appeared in the writings of the ancient Greek poet Stesicoro, from whom it passed on to poets such as Virgil. The oldest national symbol of Italy, it originated from the combination of Venus, as an evening star, with the West and therefore with the Italian peninsula, one of which was Esperia, or "land of Hesperus, the star of the Evening consecrated to Venus". This symbolism was already attested in archaic Greek literature, in 6th century BC by the poet Stesichorus, in the poem Iliupersis (Fall of Troy) that created the legend of Aeneas which described his return to the land of his ancestors (Italy) after the defeat of Troy, under the leadership of Venus.

The story of Aeneas' journey to the Italian coast from the maternal star of Venus is then resumed in Roman times by Pliny the Elder, by Marcus Terentius Varro and by Virgil, giving rise to a double tradition: the political tradition of Caesaris Astrum, the star of Julius Caesar that had originated from the appearance of a comet star shortly after his death and which was also recalled by Augustus as an auspicious sign and as a prefiguration of the Pax Romana, and the toponymy and literary tradition of Greek origin of Italy called Esperia, the "land on which the evening star sets" that is Venus. The merger of the two traditions associated the star with Italy, the center of the Roman Empire and never considered a province, having a special administrative status, being divided into the Augustan regions.

The first association between the star (the Stella Veneris) and the mural crown (the Corona muralis) of Italia turrita, from which the so-called Italia turrita e stellata, is also from the Roman era and dates back to the time of Augustus.

=== From the Middle Ages to the unification of Italy ===
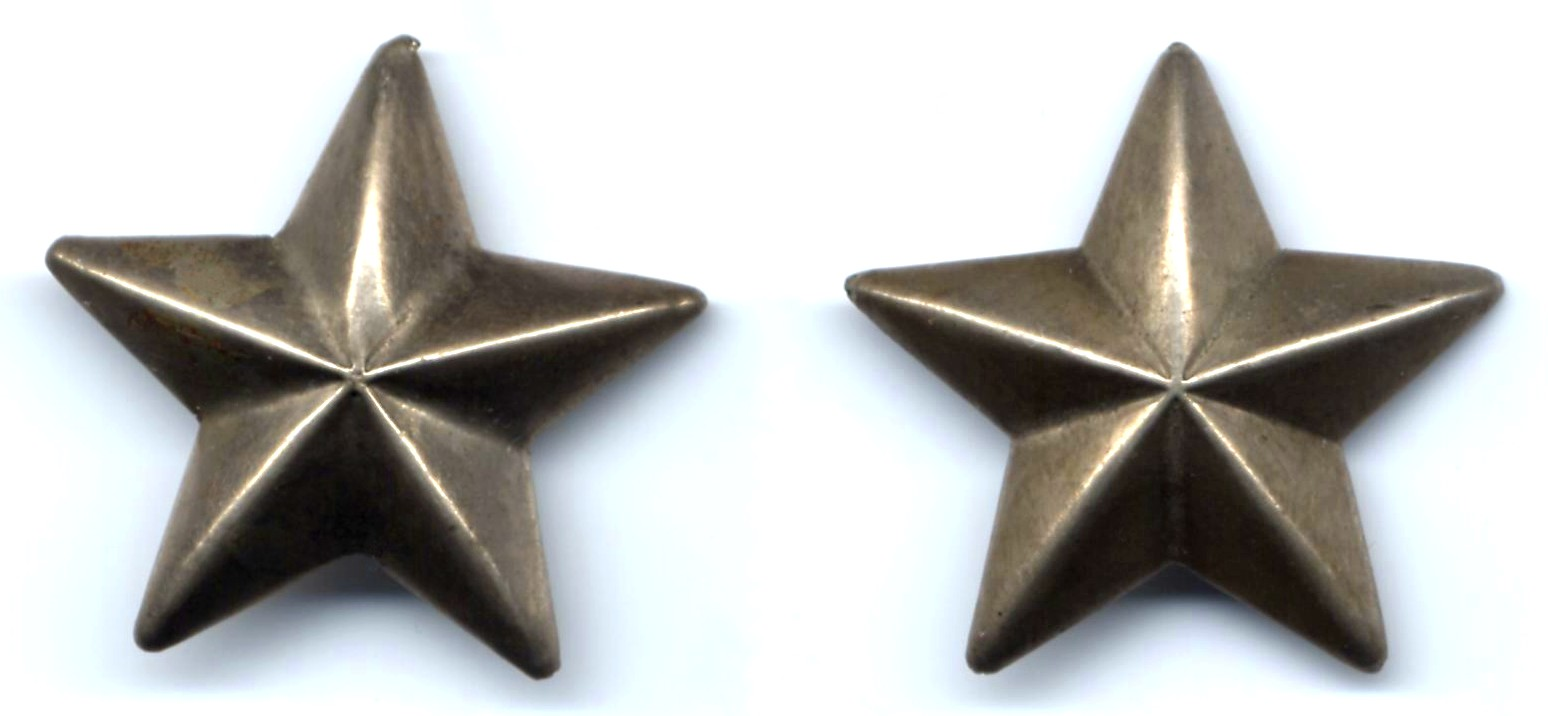
The stars of the uniforms of the Italian Armed Forces, which have their origin in the Stella d'Italia

After a period of disuse in the Middle Ages, the Star of Italy was rediscovered during the Renaissance. The symbolic meaning of Caesar's star as the precious tricolor star-shaped jewel, studded with green emeralds, white pearls and red rubies, preserved at the Castelvecchio Museum in Verona, dates back to the 14th century, is therefore still uncertain. One meaning could be that it was built for the condottiere Cangrande I della Scala, lord of Verona in which Dante Alighieri saw the new Caesar capable of unifying Italy. However, the star may also refer to Sirius, with the green, white and red colors associated with the three theological virtues.

In 1603, in the second edition of his treatise Iconologia, Cesare Ripa associated the symbol with the Italia turrita, and created a modern version of Italy's allegorical personification: a woman with a star on top of a towered crown, therefore supplied with the Corona muralis and the Stella Veneris. Ripa's treatise inspired many artists like Canova, Bisson, Maccari, Balla, Sironi, until the 1920s.

The allegorical image of the towered and star-topped Italy became popular during the unification of Italy, spreading through a large iconography of statues, friezes and decorative objects, tourist-guide covers, postcards, prints and magazines' illustrations. During the unification of Italy, evoking Aeneas' journey toward the Italian coasts, patriot Giuseppe Mazzini mentioned again the national star's myth that afterwards was recovered by Cavour and the new Savoyard kings of Italy. The reigning house even tried to get possession of it, suggesting that it was the Stella Sabauda ("Savoys' star"), a family heraldic pattern that is not mentioned in any historical document preceding the unification of Italy.

=== From the unification of Italy to republican Italy ===
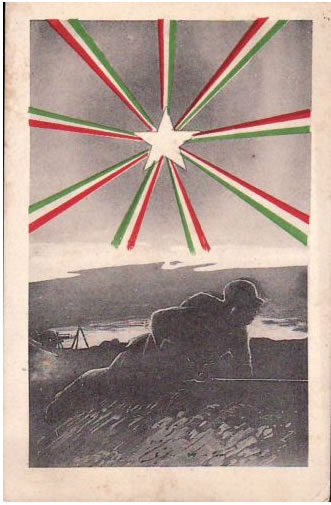
The Stella d'Italia that metaphorically assists the Italian soldier in the trenches in a postcard of the First World War

After the unification of Italy, the presence of enormous symbolic stars on the honor stage of the official ceremonies in which King Victor Emmanuel II of Italy participated led the Italians more and more to define it, in an affective way, as the "star" that protects Italy. On the Italian metallic coinage the Stella d'Italia is present on all copper emissions already from 1861 until 1907, as well as on all the coins of King Umberto I of Italy. The Stella d'Italia is also recalled by the coat of arms of the Kingdom of Italy used from 1870 to 1890. In 1871, due to the royal decree n. 571 of December 13, 1871 signed by the minister Cesare Ricotti-Magnani, the Stella d'Italia became one of the distinctive signs of the Italian Armed Forces, the so-called "stars".

The Stella d'Italia is also mentioned in the patriotic music piece Tripoli bel suol d'amore, which was written in 1911 just before the start of the Italo-Turkish War, a military campaign forming part of the Italian colonial wars to propagate the imminent war of the Kingdom of Italy against the Ottoman Empire aimed at the conquest of Libya.

The Stella d'Italia was one of the symbols of the journey by train on the Aquileia-Rome line towards the capital of Italy of the body of the Italian Unknown Soldier. The coffin was placed on a gun carriage and placed on a goods wagon designed for the occasion by Guido Cirilli. The ceremony had its epilogue in Rome with the solemn burial at the Altare della Patria on 4 November 1921 on the occasion of National Unity and Armed Forces Day. A bronze Stella d'Italia was placed on one of the two locomotives that pulled the railway hearse, while a second one was represented on the main building of the Roma Tiburtina railway station, which received the convoy in the final destination and which was known at the time as "Portonaccio station".

The protective or providential meaning of the star was then adopted by Italian Fascism and the Italian resistance movement, which placed it on the flag of the National Liberation Committee, as well as by the republicans and the monarchists on the occasion of the institutional referendum of 2 June 1946, which took place according to the end of World War II. In 1947, the Stella d'Italia was included in the center of the official Emblem of Italy, drawn by the designer Paolo Paschetto. From an allegorical point of view, the Stella d'Italia metaphorically represents the shining destiny of Italy.

== Gallery ==
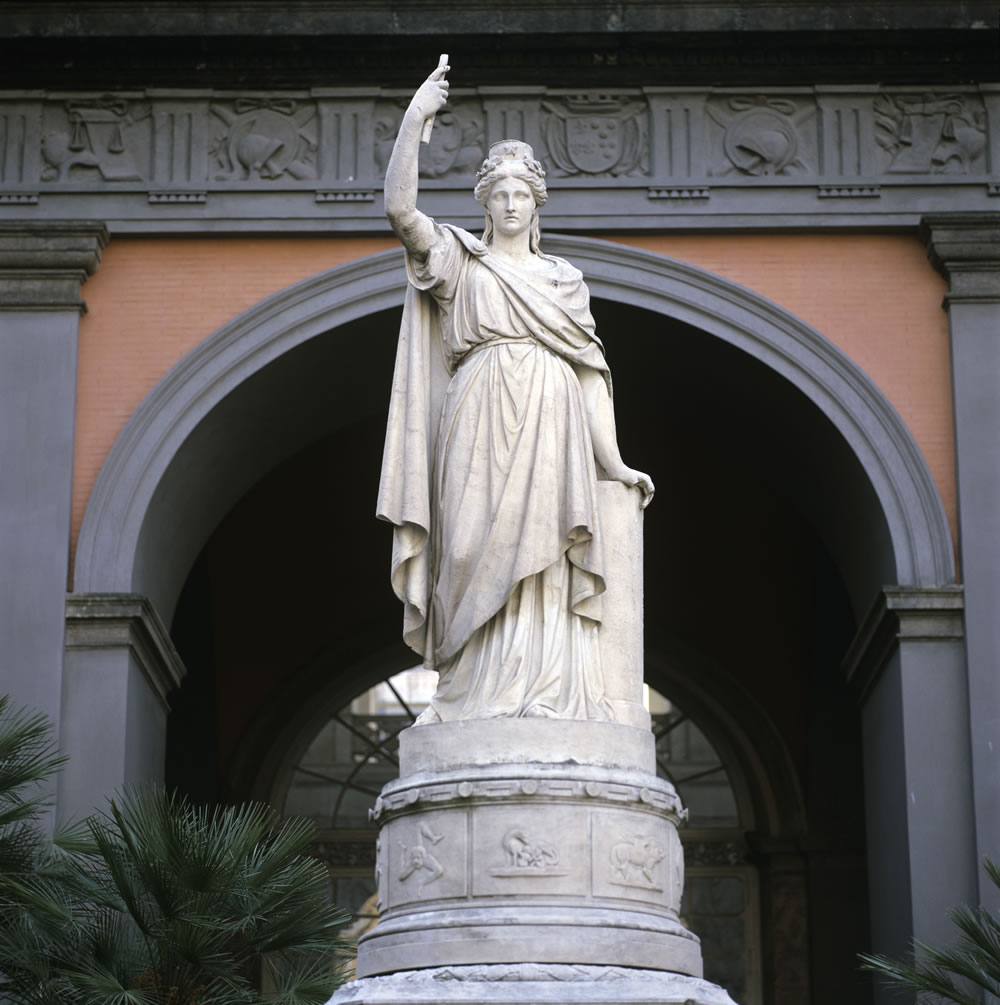
L’Italia turrita e stellata, 1861, Palazzo Reale of Naples. Note the little star on the crown.

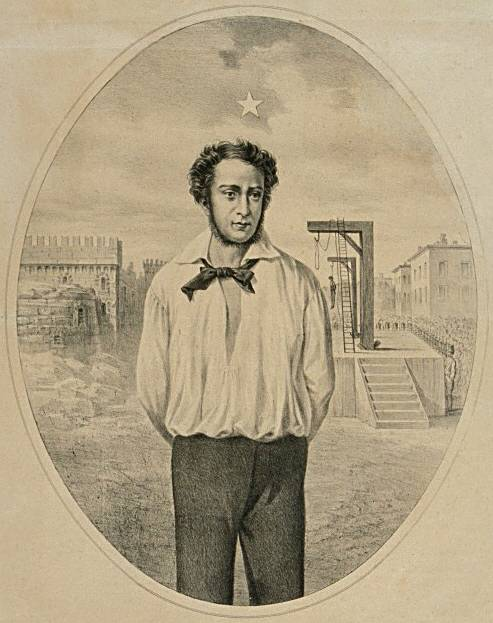
Lithograph of the Italian patriot Ciro Menotti with the Star of Italy above his head (1875)

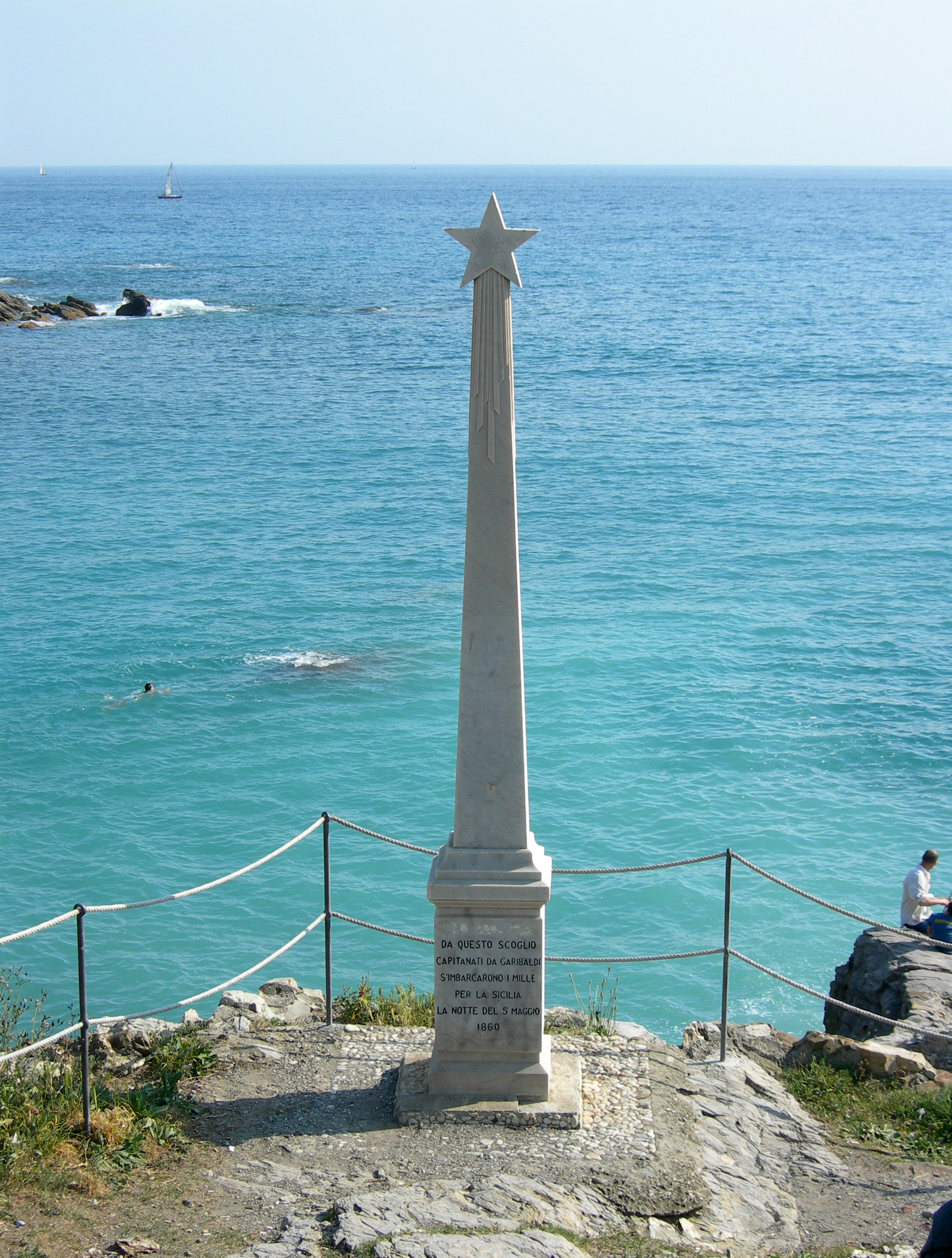
Monument to the Expedition of the Thousand in Quarto dei Mille. Note the star on the top.

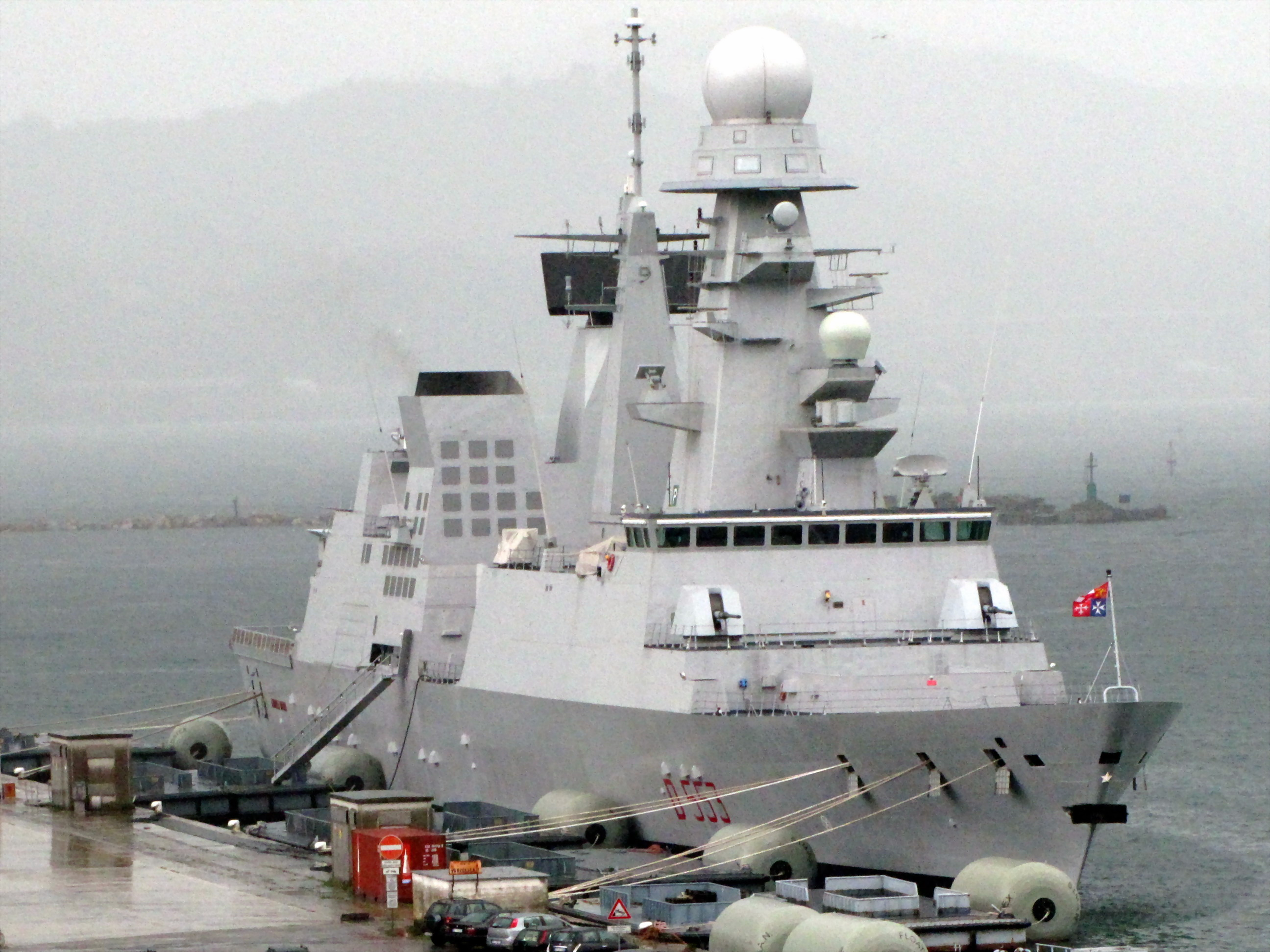
Italian destroyer Andrea Doria (D 553) with the Star of Italy as figurehead

Coat of arms of the Napoleonic Kingdom of Italy with the star above the eagle supporter

Coat of arms of the Kingdom of Italy with the star on top of the pavilion

== See also ==
- Italia turrita
- Emblem of Italy
- National symbols of Italy
- Order of the Star of Italy

== General and cited references ==
- Bazzano, Nicoletta (2011). Donna Italia. L'allegoria della Penisola dall'antichità ai giorni nostri (in Italian). Angelo Colla Editore. ISBN 978-88-96817-06-3.
- Lista, Giovanni (2011). La Stella d'Italia (in Italian). Milan: Edizioni Mudima. ISBN 978-88-96817-06-3.
- Rossi, Girolamo (2014). Lo scudo crociato. Un simbolo medievale nella comunicazione politica del Novecento (in Italian). Armando Editore. ISBN 978-88-96817-06-3.
