= National symbols of Italy =

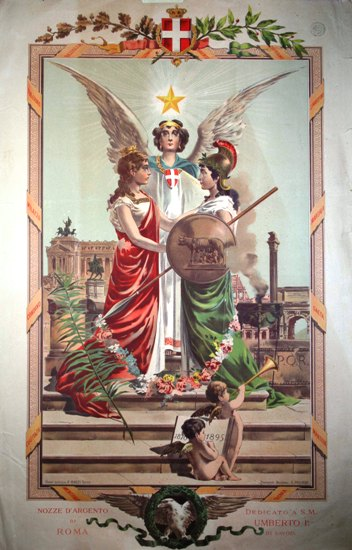
Allegorical print of 1895 celebrating the 25th anniversary of the capture of Rome. The figure contains numerous national symbols of Italy associated with allegories of ancient Roman history. (Note: The central subject of the print is formed by three female figures with dresses forming the flag of Italy. At the center there is a winged Victory surmounted by the Stella d'Italia and adorned with a collar bearing the Savoy coat of arms. On the left is the Italia turrita, while on the right is the warrior Rome with a Roman helmet holding a spear and a shield with the image of the Capitoline Wolf nursing Romulus and Remus. On the left is the palm of victory, while in the background we can recognize the Altare della Patria, the Equestrian Statue of Marcus Aurelius of the Capitoline Hill, the Colosseum, a Triumphal arch, the Trajan's Column, the word SPQR and a winged putto playing the ring of victory. The image is surmounted by a weave of oak and strawberry tree, while below is an aquila with spread wings in a laurel wreath.)

National symbols of Italy are the symbols that uniquely identify Italy reflecting its history and culture. They are used to represent the nation through emblems, metaphors, personifications, allegories, which are shared by the entire Italian people.

Some of them are official, i.e. they are recognized by the Italian state authorities, while others are part of the identity of the country without being defined by law.

== Description ==
The three main official symbols, whose typology is present in the symbology of all nations, are:

- the flag of Italy, that is, the national flag in green, white and red, as required by article 12 of the Constitution of the Italian Republic;
- the emblem of Italy, that is the iconic symbol identifying the Italian Republic;
- "Il Canto degli Italiani" by Goffredo Mameli and Michele Novaro, the Italian national anthem, which is performed in all public events.

Of these only the flag is explicitly mentioned in the Italian Constitution; this normative insertion puts the flag under the protection of the law, making it possible criminal penalties for contempt of the same.

Other official symbols, as reported by the Presidency of the Italian Republic, are:

- the Presidential Standard of Italy, that is the distinctive standard representing the Presidency of the Italian Republic;
- the Altare della Patria, or the national monument dedicated to King Vittorio Emanuele II of Savoy, the first Sovereign of a united Italy and founder of the Fatherland, which houses the shrine of the Italian tomb of the Unknown Soldier.
- the Festa della Repubblica, that is the national celebratory day established to commemorate the birth of the Italian Republic, which is celebrated every year on 2 June, date of the institutional referendum of 1946 with which the monarchy was abolished;

The teaching in the schools of Il Canto degli Italiani, the reflection on the Risorgimento events, and on the adoption of the Flag of Italy are prescribed by law n. 222 of 23 November 2012.

There are also other symbols or emblems of Italy which, although not defined by law, are part of the Italian identity:

- the Italia turrita, that is the national personification of Italy in the appearance of a young woman with her head surrounded by a wall crown completed by towers (hence the term "turrita");
- Goddess Roma, the personification of the city of Rome and more broadly, of the ancient Roman state.
- the cockade of Italy, or the national ornament of Italy, obtained by folding a green, white and red ribbon into plissé using the technique called plissage ("pleating");
- the Italian wolf, which inhabits Apennine Mountains and the Western Alps, features prominently in Latin and Italian cultures, such as in the legend of the founding of Rome. It is unofficially considered the national animal of Italy.
- the national colours of Italy are green, white, and red, collectively known in Italian as il tricolore (the tricolour). In sport in Italy, savoy azure has been used or adopted as the colour for many national teams, the first being the men's football team in 1910. The national auto racing colour of Italy is instead rosso corsa ("racing red"), while in other disciplines, such as cycling and winter sports, often use white.
- the strawberry tree, or the small tree chosen as a national tree because of its green leaves, its white flowers and its red berries, colors that recall the Italian flag; The flower of the strawberry tree is the national flower of Italy.
- the Italian sparrow, considered the national bird of Italy.
- the Stella d'Italia, the most ancient identity symbol of Italian land, since it dates back to Graeco-Roman tradition.
- the Frecce Tricolori, or the national aerobatic team of the Italian Air Force.

== Symbols ==
=== Altare della Patria ===
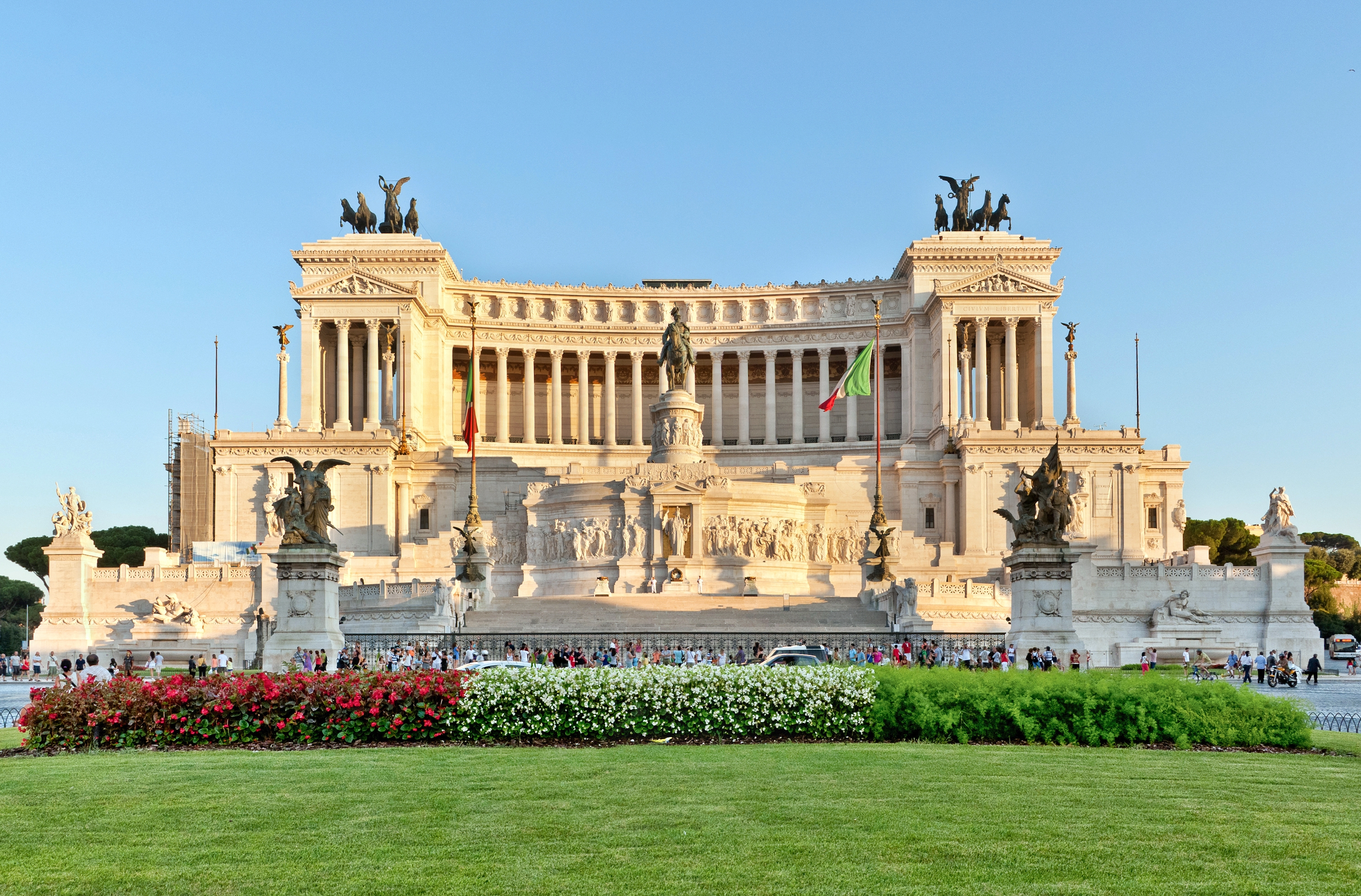
Altare della Patria

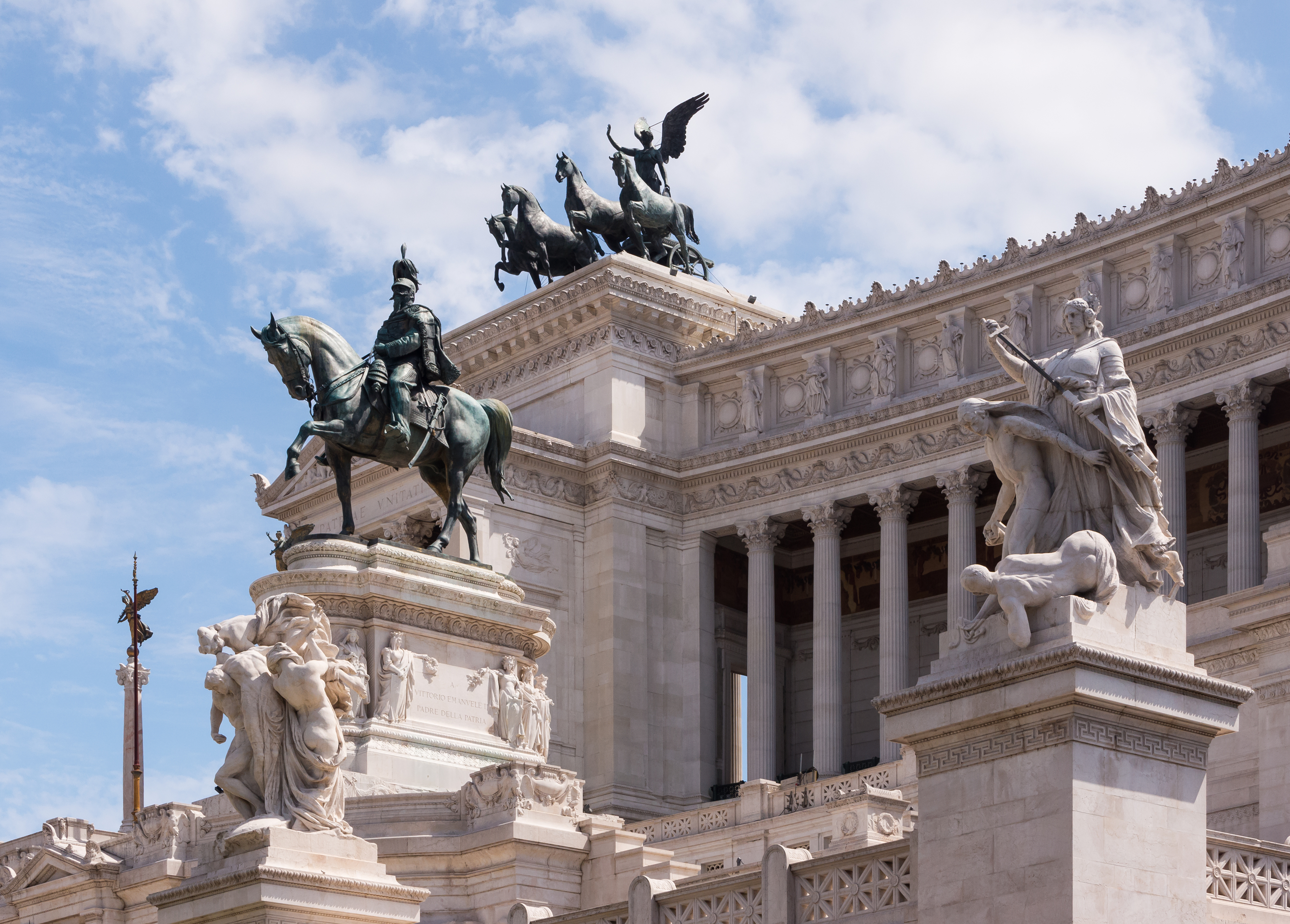
View of the artistic and architectural works present in the Vittoriano

The Vittorio Emanuele II Monument (Italian: Monumento Nazionale a Vittorio Emanuele II) or Vittoriano, or also Altare della Patria (English: Altar of the Fatherland), is a monument built in honor of Victor Emmanuel II, the first king of a unified Italy, located in Rome, Italy. It occupies a site between the Piazza Venezia and the Capitoline Hill. The monument was realized by Giuseppe Sacconi. It is currently managed by the Polo Museale del Lazio, the Italian Ministry of Defense and the Museo Centrale del Risorgimento Italiano.

From an architectural point of view it was conceived as a modern forum, an agora on three levels connected by stairways and dominated by a portico characterized by a colonnade. The complex process of national unity and liberation from foreign domination carried out by King Vittorio Emanuele II of Savoy, to whom the monument is dedicated, has a great symbolic and representative value, being architecturally and artistically centered on the Italian unification: for this reason the Vittoriano is considered one of the national symbols of Italy.

It also preserves the Altar of the Fatherland (Italian: Altare della Patria), first an altar of the goddess Roma and then also a shrine of the Italian Unknown Soldier, thus adopting the function of a lay temple consecrated to Italy. Because of its great representative value, the entire Vittoriano is often called the Altare della Patria, although the latter constitutes only a part of it.

Located in the center of ancient Rome and connected to modern Rome via streets radiating from Piazza Venezia, Vittoriano has been consecrated as having symbolic value. This is primarily due to the Vittorio Emanuele II Monument and the realization of the Altare della Patria, a lay temple metaphorically dedicated to a free, united and celebrated Italy. This site also houses a temple dedicated to the burial of the Italian Unknown Soldier, those who sacrificed themselves for the homeland and its connected ideals.

=== Cockade of Italy ===
Cockade of Italy

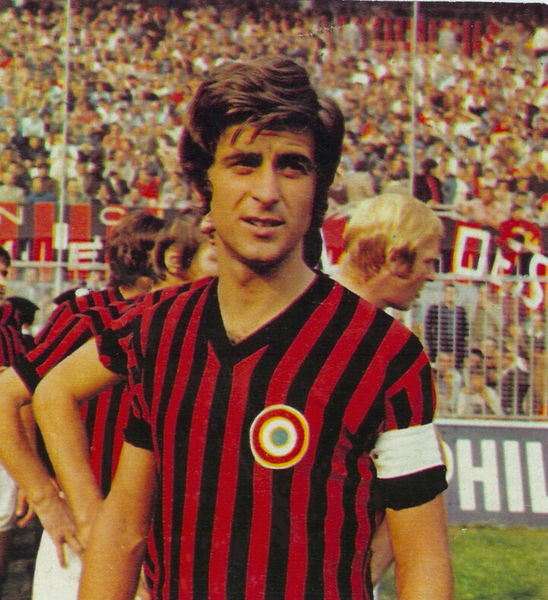
Gianni Rivera, soccer player of A.C. Milan, with the cockade of Italy, in an image from the early 1970s

The cockade of Italy (Italian: Coccarda italiana tricolore) is the national ornament of Italy, obtained by folding a green, white and red ribbon into a plissé using the technique called plissage (pleating). It is one of the national symbols of Italy and is composed of the three colours of the Italian flag with the green in the centre, the white immediately outside and the red on the edge. The cockade with the red and green inverted position is instead that of Iran. The cockade, a revolutionary symbol par excellence, was the protagonist of the uprisings that characterized the Italian unification, being pinned on the jacket or on the hats in its tricolour form by the many patriots who were protagonists of this period of the history of Italy - during which the Italian Peninsula achieved the own national unity - which culminated on 17 March 1861 with the proclamation of the Kingdom of Italy. On 14 June 1848, it replaced the azure cockade on the uniforms of some departments of the Royal Sardinian Army (become Royal Italian Army in 1861), while on 1 January 1948, with the birth of the Italian Republic, it took its place as a national ornament.

The Italian tricolour cockade appeared for the first time in Genoa on 21 August 1789, and with it the colours of the three Italian national colours, anticipating by seven years the first tricolour military banner, which was adopted by the Lombard Legion in Milan on 11 October 1796, and of eight years the birth of the flag of Italy, which had its origins on 7 January 1797, when it became for the first time a national flag of an Italian sovereign State, the Cispadane Republic.

The Italian tricolour cockade is one of the symbols of the Italian Air Force, is widely used on all Italian state aircraft, not only military, it is the basis of the parade frieze of the Bersaglieri, cavalry regiments, Carabinieri and Guardia di Finanza, and a reproduction of it in fabric is sewn on the shirts of the sports teams holding the Coppa Italia (English: Italy Cup) that are organized in various national team sports. It is tradition, for the most important offices of the State, excluding the President of the Italian Republic, to have a tricolour cockade pinned to their jacket during the military parade of the Festa della Repubblica, which is celebrated every 2 June.

=== Emblem of Italy ===
Emblem of Italy

The emblem of the Italian Republic (Italian: emblema della Repubblica Italiana) was formally adopted by the newly formed Italian Republic on 5 May 1948. Although often referred to as a coat of arms (or stemma in Italian), it is technically an emblem akin to so-called socialist heraldry as it was not designed to conform to traditional heraldic rules.

The emblem comprises a white five-pointed star, the Stella d'Italia, with a thin red border, superimposed upon a five-spoked cogwheel, standing between an olive branch to the left side and an oak branch to the right side; the branches are in turn bound together by a red ribbon with the inscription "REPVBBLICA ITALIANA" ("Italian Republic" written in Italian, but in an ancient Roman-style Latin alphabet). The emblem is used extensively by the Italian government.

The armorial bearings of the House of Savoy, blazoned gules a cross argent, were previously in use by the former Kingdom of Italy; the supporters, on either side a lion rampant Or, were replaced with fasci littori (literally bundles of the lictors) during the fascist era.

=== Festa della Repubblica ===
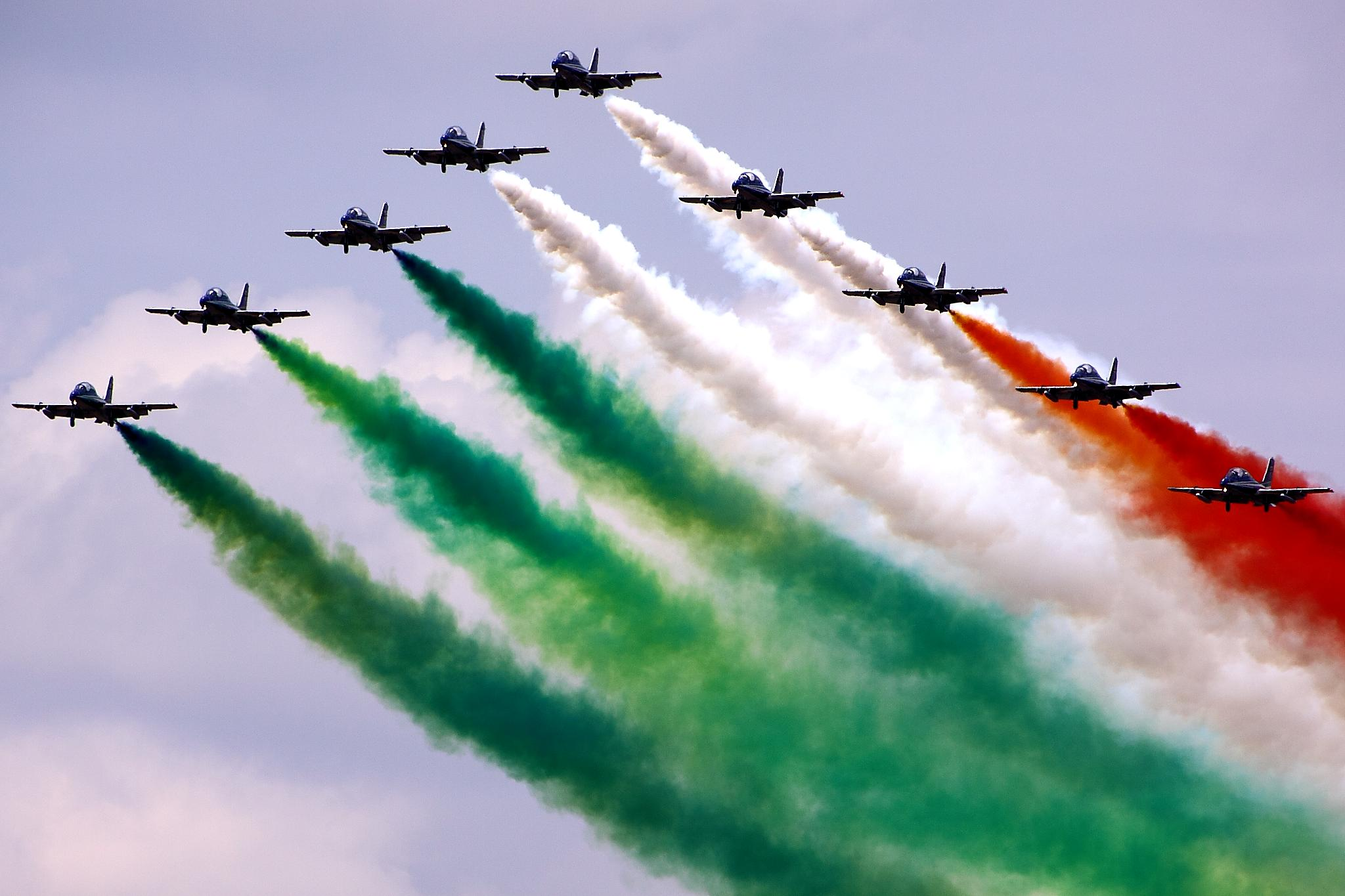
Former President Giorgio Napolitano reviewing formations deployed for the military magazine during the Festa della Repubblica 2008

Festa della Repubblica ([ˈfɛsta della reˈpubblika]; in English, Republic Day) is the Italian National Day and Republic Day, which is celebrated on 2 June each year, with the main celebration that takes place in Rome. The Festa della Repubblica is one of the national symbols of Italy.

The day commemorates the institutional referendum held by universal suffrage in 1946, in which the Italian people were called to the polls to decide on the form of government, following the Second World War and the fall of Fascism.

The ceremonial of the event organized in Rome includes the deposition of a laurel wreath as a tribute to the Unknown Soldier at the Altare della Patria by the President of the Italian Republic and a military parade along Via dei Fori Imperiali in Rome.

=== Flag of Italy ===
Flag of Italy

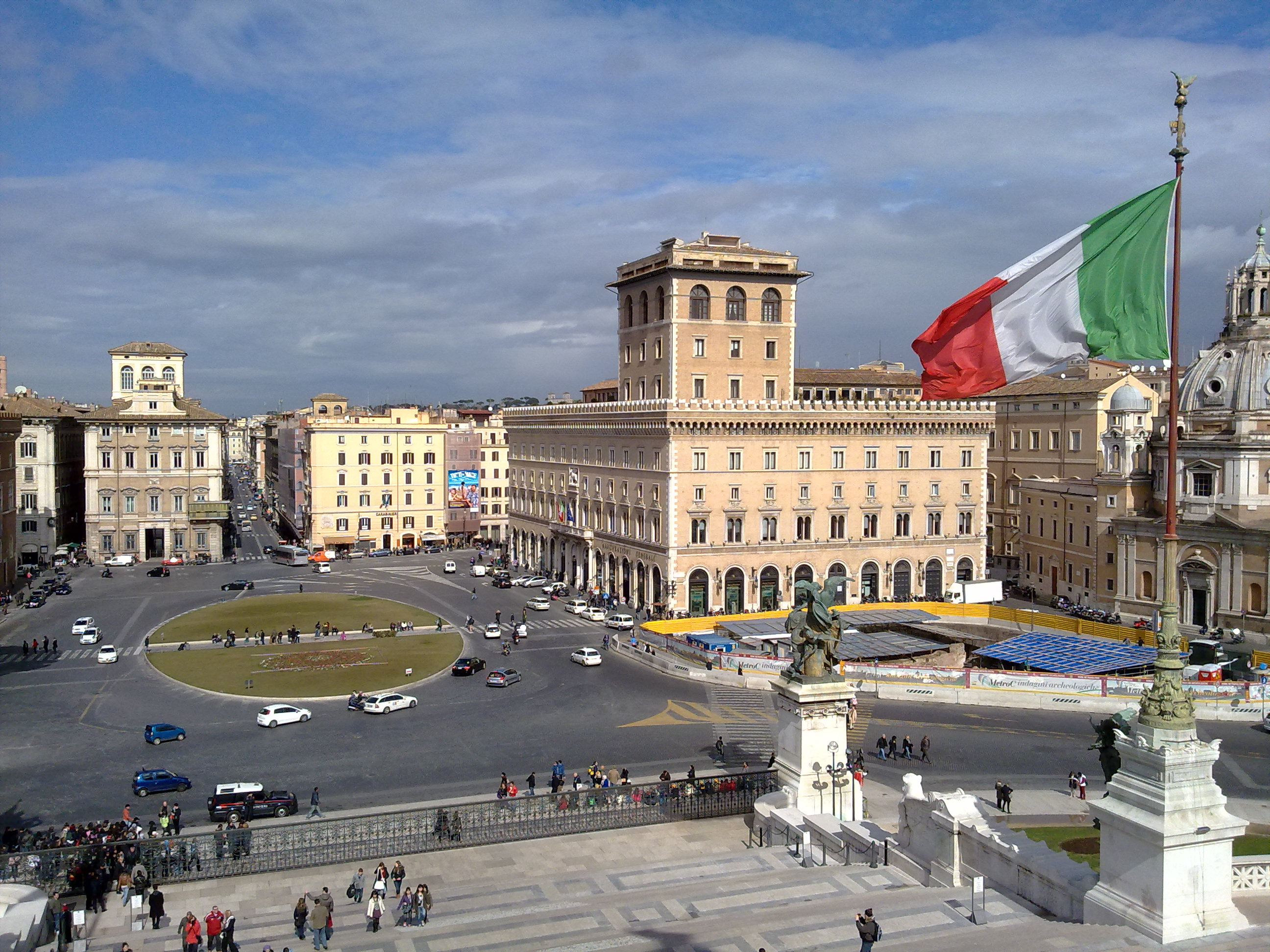
The flag of Italy flies from the terraces of the Altare della Patria in Rome.

The flag of Italy (Italian: Bandiera d'Italia, Italian: [banˈdjɛːra diˈtaːlja]), often referred to in Italian as il Tricolore (Italian: [il trikoˈloːre]), the national flag of Italy. It is a tricolour featuring three equally sized vertical pales of green, white and red, national colours of Italy, with the green at the hoist side, as defined by article 12 of the Constitution of the Italian Republic. The Italian law regulates its use and display, protecting its defense and providing for the crime of insulting it; it also prescribes its teaching in Italian schools together with other national symbols of Italy.

The Tricolour Day, Flag Day dedicated to the Italian flag, was established by law n. 671 of 31 December 1996, which is held every year on 7 January. This celebration commemorates the first official adoption of the tricolour as a national flag by a sovereign Italian state, the Cispadane Republic, a Napoleonic sister republic of Revolutionary France, which took place in Reggio Emilia on 7 January 1797, on the basis of the events following the French Revolution (1789–1799) which, among its ideals, advocated the national self-determination. The Italian national colours appeared for the first time in Genoa on a tricolour cockade on 21 August 1789, anticipating by seven years the first green, white and red Italian military war flag, which was adopted by the Lombard Legion in Milan on 11 October 1796.

After 7 January 1797, popular support for the Italian flag grew steadily, until it became one of the most important symbols of the Italian unification, which culminated on 17 March 1861 with the proclamation of the Kingdom of Italy, of which the tricolour became the national flag. Following its adoption, the tricolour became one of the most recognisable and defining features of united Italian statehood in the following two centuries of the history of Italy.

=== Frecce Tricolori ===
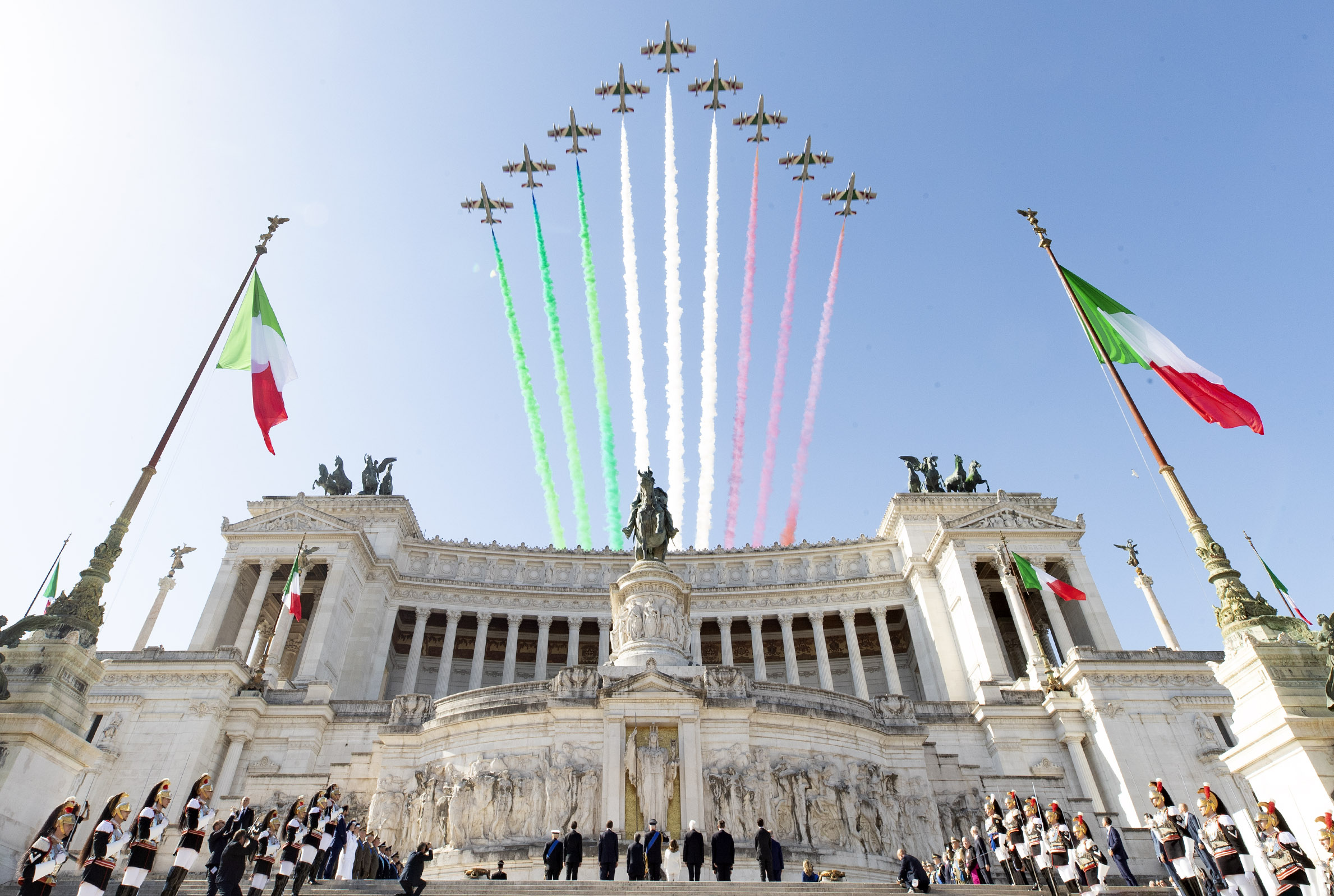
Frecce Tricolori

The Frecce Tricolori ([ˈfrettʃe trikoˈloːri]; literally "Tricolour Arrows"), officially known as the 313° Gruppo Addestramento Acrobatico, Pattuglia Acrobatica Nazionale (PAN) Frecce Tricolori ("313th Acrobatic Training Group, National Aerobatic Team (PAN) Frecce Tricolori"), is the aerobatic demonstration team of the Italian Air Force, based at Rivolto Air Base, province of Udine, in the north-eastern Italian region of Friuli-Venezia Giulia, born in 1961 following the decision of the same Air Force and to create a permanent group for the training for the collective air acrobatics of its pilots.

They were formed in 1961 as an Air Force team, replacing unofficial teams that had been sponsored by various commands by the beginning of the 1930s. The team flies the Aermacchi MB-339-A/PAN, a two-seat fighter-trainer craft capable of 898 km/h at sea level. With ten aircraft, nine in training and a soloist, they are the world's largest acrobatics patrol, and their flight schedule, comprising about twenty acrobatics and about half an hour, made them the most famous in the world.

=== Goddess Roma ===
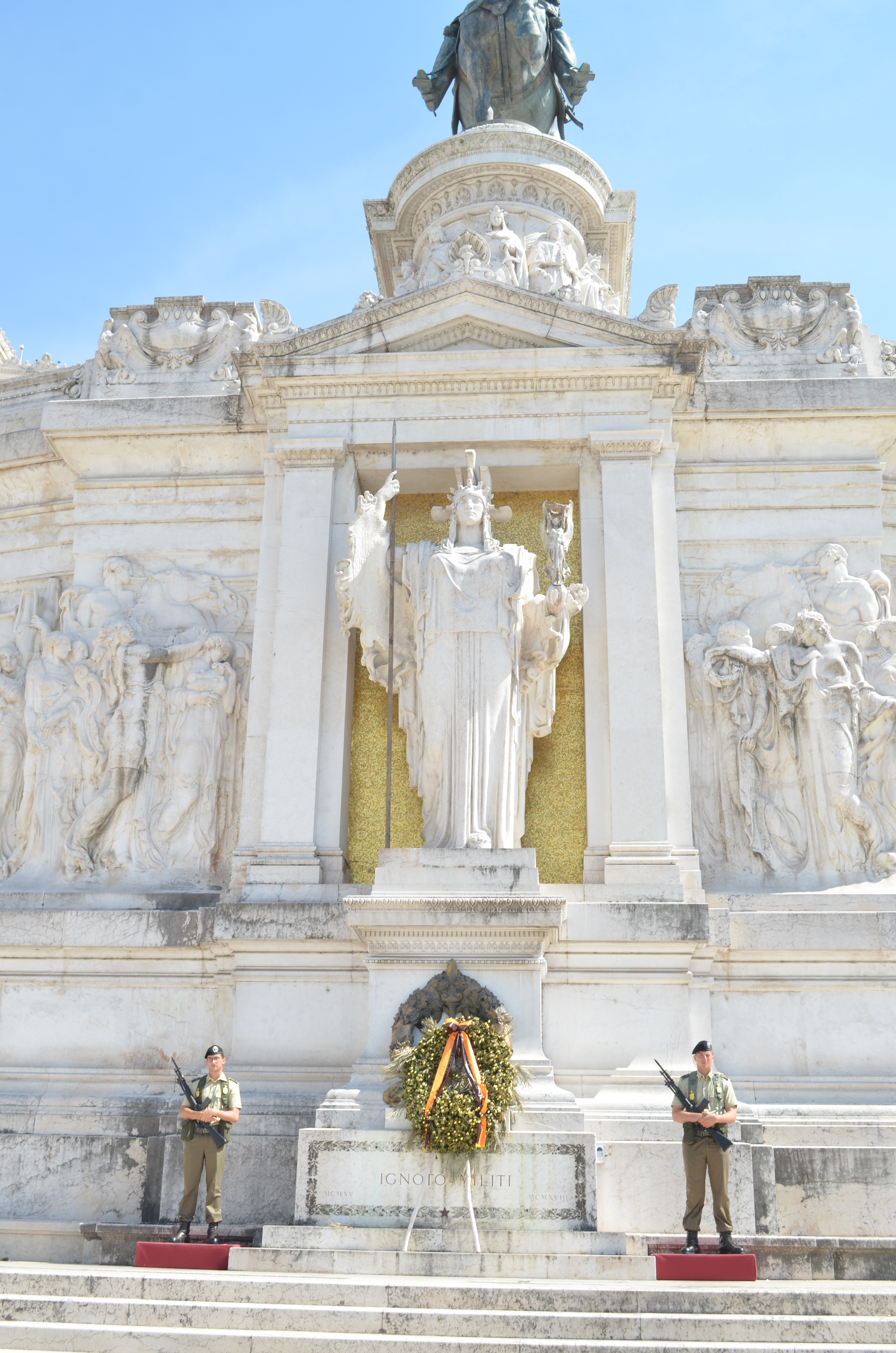
Tomb of the Italian Unknown Soldier, under the statue of Roma, at Altare della Patria, Rome

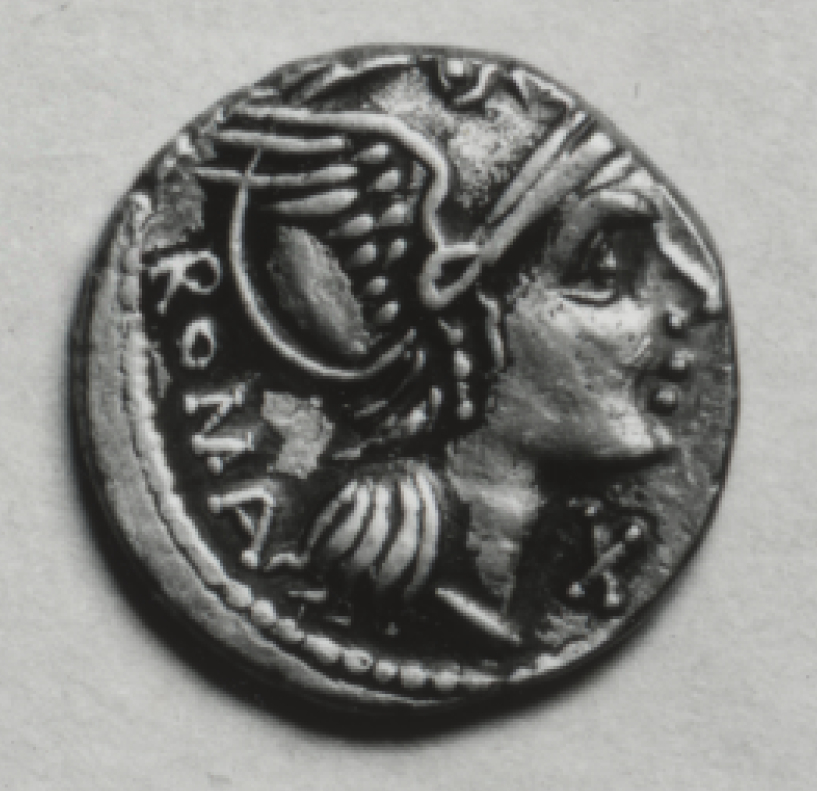
Roma on a denarius, 93-92 BC (Walters Art Museum)

In ancient Roman religion, Roma was a female deity who personified the city of Rome and more broadly, the Roman state. She was created and promoted to represent and propagate certain of Rome's ideas about itself, and to justify its rule. She was portrayed on coins, sculptures, architectural designs, and at official games and festivals. In Rome, the Emperor Hadrian built and dedicated a gigantic temple to her as Roma Aeterna ("Eternal Rome"), and to Venus Felix, ("Venus the Bringer of Good Fortune"), emphasising the sacred, universal and eternal nature of the empire. Roma's official cult served to advance the propagandist message of Imperial Rome. In Roman art and coinage, she is usually depicted in military form, with helmet and weapons. In Rome's eastern provinces, she was often shown with mural crown or cornucopia, or both. Her image is rarely found in a commonplace or domestic context. Roma was probably favoured by Rome's high-status Imperial representatives abroad, rather than the Roman populace at large. She was depicted on silver cups, arches, and sculptures, including the base of the column of Antoninus Pius. She survived into the Christian period as a personification of the Roman state. Her depiction seated with a shield and spear later influenced that of Britannia, personification of Britain.

The Altar of the Fatherland is the most famous part of the Altare della Patria in Rome and is the one with which it is often identified. On the top of the entrance stairway, it was designed by the Brescian sculptor Angelo Zanelli, who won a competition specially held in 1906. It is formed from the side of the Tomb of Italian Unknown Soldier that faces the outside of the building (the other side, which faces inside the Vittoriano, is in a crypt), from the sacellum of the statue of Roma (which is exactly above the tomb of the Unknown Soldier) and two vertical marble reliefs that descend from the edges of the aedicula containing the statue of the goddess Rome and which run downwards laterally to the tomb of the Unknown Soldier.

The statue of Roma present at the Vittoriano interrupted a custom in vogue until the 19th century, by which the representation of this subject was with exclusively warlike traits. Angelo Zanelli, in his work, decided to further characterize the statue by also providing the reference to Athena, Greek goddess of wisdom and the arts, as well as of war. The great statue of the deity emerges from a golden background. The presence of the goddess Roma in the Vittoriano underlines the irremissible will of the Unification of Italy patriots to have the Rome as the capital of Italy, an essential concept, according to the common feeling, from the history of the peninsula and the islands of Italian culture.

=== Il Canto degli Italiani ===
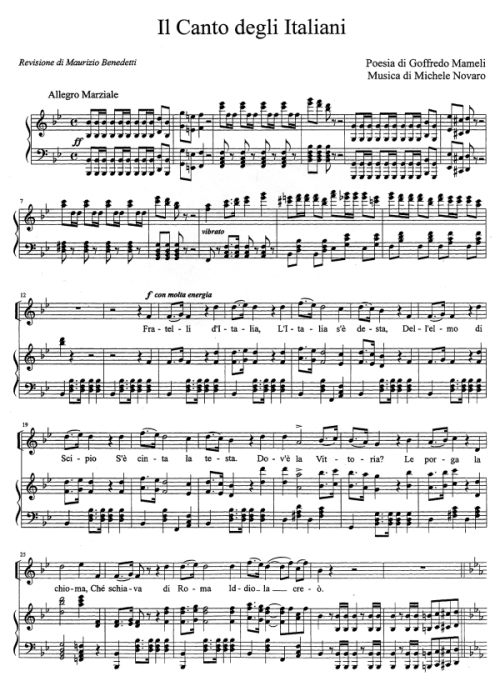
"Il Canto degli Italiani"

The vocal recording of the Italian National Anthem «Il Canto degli Italiani», performed by the Italian Navy band

"Il Canto degli Italiani" (Italian pronunciation: [il ˈkanto deʎʎ itaˈljaːni]; "The Song of Italians") is a canto written by Goffredo Mameli set to music by Michele Novaro in 1847, and is the current national anthem of Italy. It is best known among Italians as the Inno di Mameli ([ˈinno di maˈmɛːli], "Mameli's Hymn"), after the author of the lyrics, or Fratelli d'Italia ([fraˈtɛlli diˈtaːlja], "Brothers of Italy"), from its opening line. The piece, a 4/4 in B-flat major, consists of six strophes and a refrain that is sung at the end of each strophe. The sixth group of verses, which is almost never performed, recalls the text of the first strophe.

The song was very popular during the unification of Italy and in the following decades, although after the proclamation of the Kingdom of Italy (1861) the Marcia Reale (Royal March), the official hymn of the House of Savoy composed in 1831 by order of King Charles Albert of Sardinia, was chosen as the anthem of the Kingdom of Italy. "Il Canto degli Italiani" was in fact considered too little conservative with respect to the political situation of the time: Fratelli d'Italia, of clear republican and Jacobin connotation, it was difficult to reconcile with the outcome of the unification of Italy, which was a monarchy.

After the Second World War, Italy became a republic, and "Il Canto degli Italiani" was chosen, on 12 October 1946, as a provisional national anthem, a role that it later preserved while remaining the de facto anthem of the Italian Republic. Over the decades there were several unsuccessful attempts to make it the official national anthem, but it finally gained de jure status on 4 December 2017.

=== Italia turrita ===
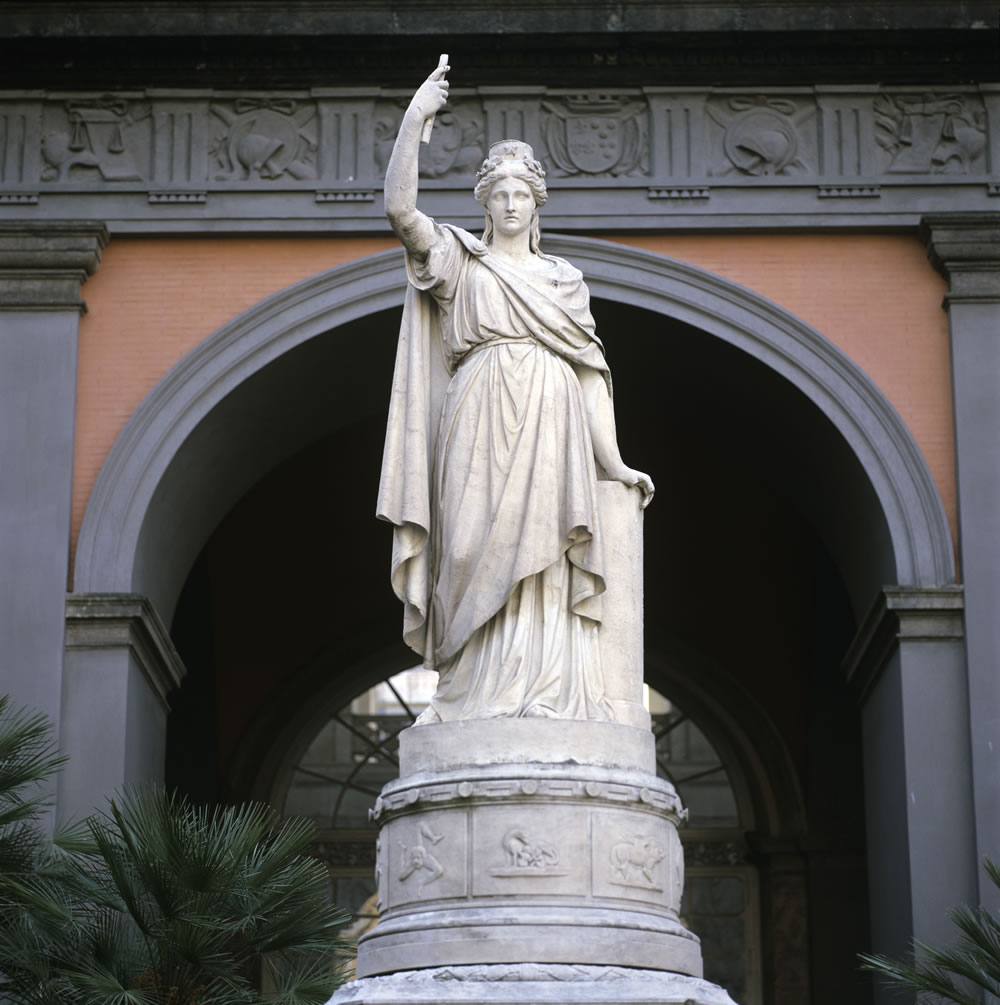
Statue of the Italia turrita in Naples

Italia turrita (pronounced [iˈtaːlja turˈriːta]; "Turreted Italy") is the national personification or allegory of Italy, in the appearance of a young woman with her head surrounded by a mural crown completed by towers (hence turrita or "with towers" in Italian). It is often accompanied by the Stella d'Italia ("Star of Italy"), from which the so-called Italia turrita e stellata ("turreted and stellate Italy"), and by other additional attributes, the most common of which is the cornucopia. The allegorical representation with the towers, which draws its origins from ancient Rome, is typical of Italian civic heraldry, so much so that the wall crown is also the symbol of the cities of Italy.

Italia turrita, which is one of the national symbols of Italy, has been widely depicted for centuries in the fields of art, politics and literature. Its most classic aspect, which derives from the primordial myth of the Great Mediterranean Mother and which was definitively specified at the turn of the 16th and 17th centuries by Cesare Ripa, wants to symbolically convey the royalty and nobility of Italian cities (thanks to the presence of crown turrita), the abundance of agricultural crops of the Italian Peninsula (represented by the cornucopia) and the shining destiny of Italy (symbolized by the Stella d'Italia).

=== Italian sparrow ===
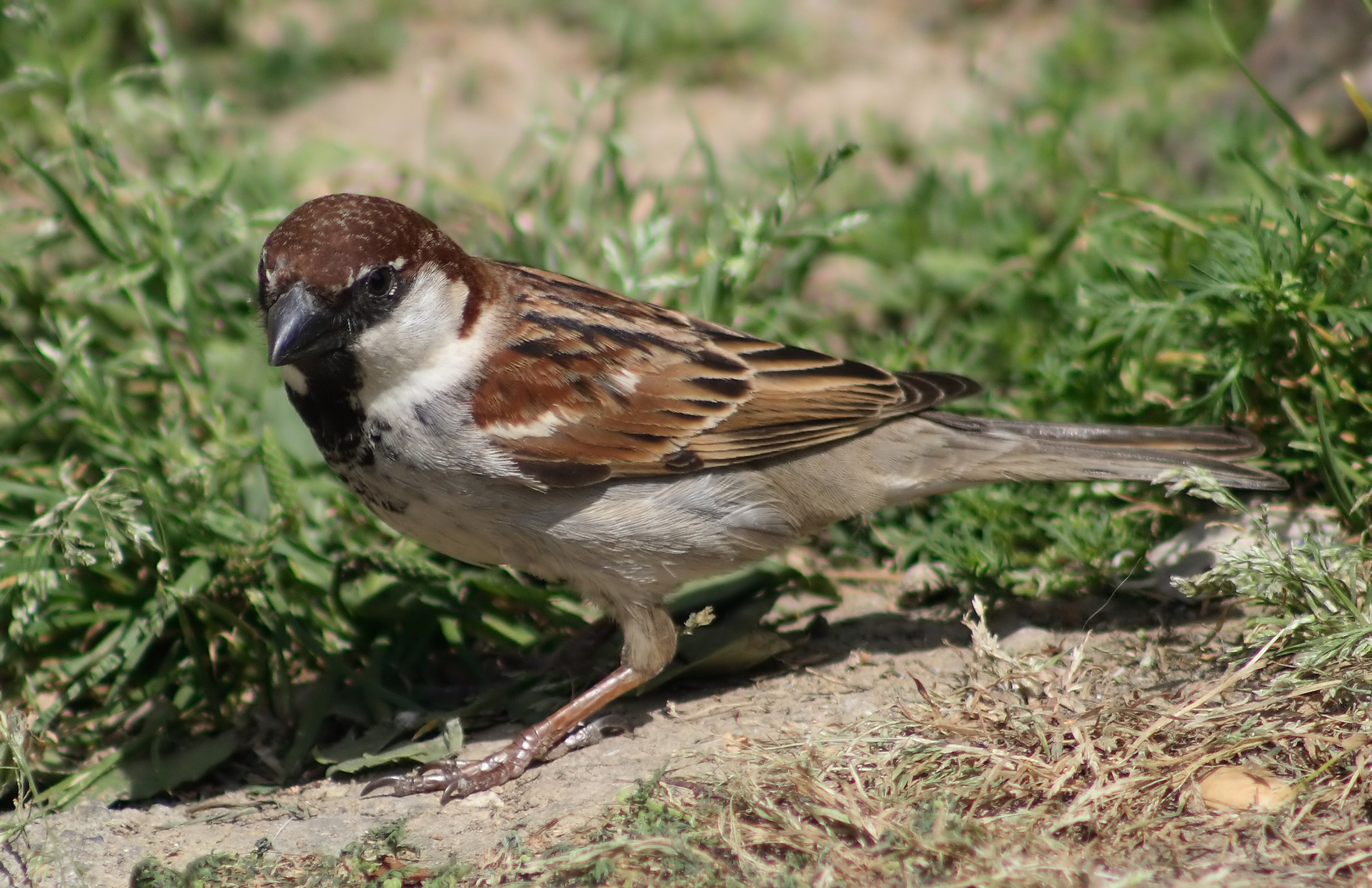
Italian sparrow

The Italian sparrow is considered the national bird of Italy. In appearance, it is intermediate between the house sparrow, and the Spanish sparrow, a species of the Mediterranean and Central Asia closely related to the house sparrow. The Italian sparrow occurs in northern Italy and neighbouring regions, with intermediates with the house sparrow in a very narrow contact zone in the Alps, a slow gradation in appearance from the Italian to Spanish sparrows across central and southern Italy, and more birds of intermediate appearance in Malta, Crete, and other parts of the Mediterranean.

=== Italian wolf ===
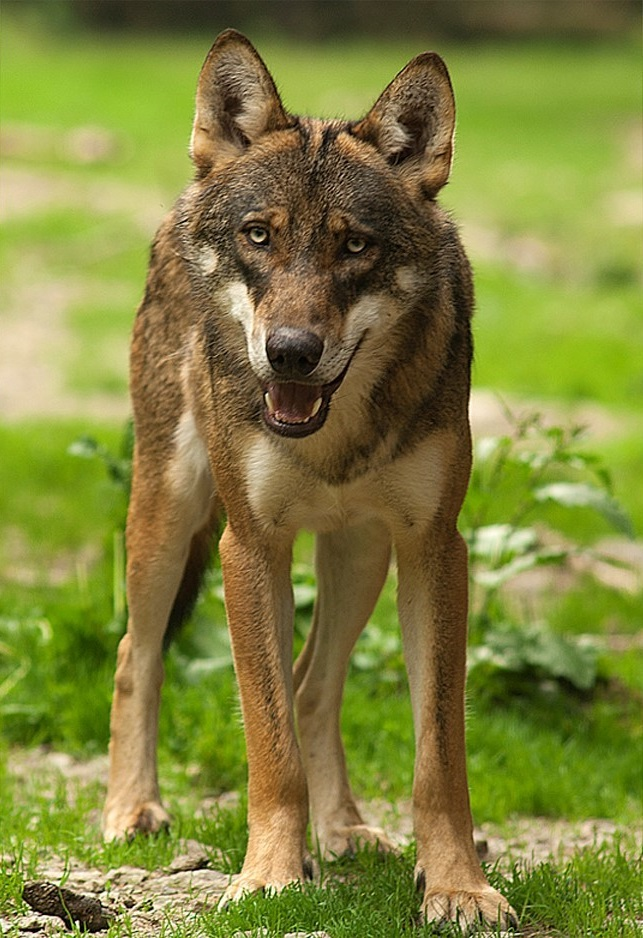
Italian wolf

The Italian wolf features prominently in Latin and Italian cultures, such as in the legend of the founding of Rome. It is unofficially considered the national animal of Italy. The Italian wolf (Canis lupus italicus or Canis lupus lupus), also known as the Apennine wolf, is a subspecies of grey wolf native to the Italian Peninsula. It inhabits the Apennine Mountains and the Western Alps, though it is undergoing expansion towards the north and east. As of 2019, the Italian wolf population is estimated to consist of 1500–2000 individuals. It has been strictly protected in Italy since the 1970s, when the population reached a low of 70–100 individuals. The population is increasing in number, though illegal hunting and persecution still constitute a threat. Since the 1990s, the Italian wolf's range has expanded into southwestern France and Switzerland. Although not universally recognised as a distinct subspecies, it nonetheless possesses a unique mtDNA haplotype and a distinct skull morphology.

=== National colours of Italy ===
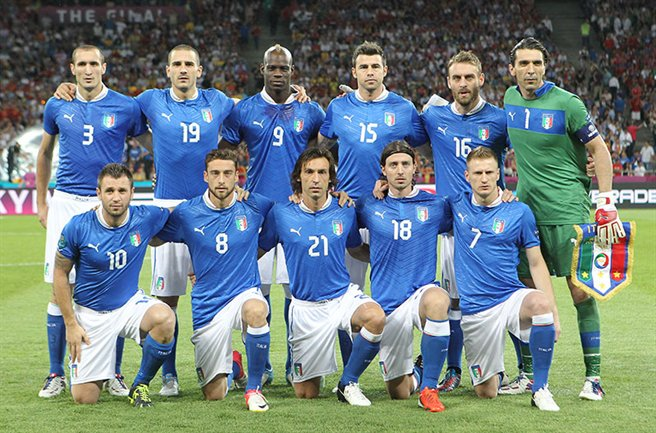
Italy national football team

The national colours of Italy are green, white, and red, collectively known in Italian as il Tricolore (English: the Tricolour, Italian: [il trikoˈloːre]). The three Italian national colours appeared for the first time in Genoa on 21 August 1789 on the cockade of Italy shortly after the outbreak of the French Revolution, on 11 October 1796 they were used for the first time in Milan on a military banner, while on 7 January 1797 in Reggio Emilia they appeared for the first time on a flag.

In sport in Italy, it is instead widely used the savoy azure, a chromatic tone that was adopted for the first time in 1910 on the uniforms of the Italy national football team and which owes its name to the fact that it is the color of House of Savoy, the ruling dynasty in Italy from 1861 to 1946. It became national color with the unification of Italy (1861), and its use continued even after Italy became a republic (1946).

The national auto racing colour of Italy is instead rosso corsa ("racing red"), while in other disciplines such as cycling and winter sports, white is often used.

=== Presidential standard of Italy ===
Presidential standard of Italy

The Presidential standard of Italy (Italian: Stendardo presidenziale italiano) is the distinctive standard of the presence of the President of the Italian Republic.

Therefore, it follows the Head of State whenever he leaves the Quirinal Palace, where he is exposed during his presence. The standard is displayed on the means of transport on which the president ascends, outside the prefectures when the president is visiting a city and inside the halls where he acts in an official capacity. The presidential standard is one of the National symbols of Italy.

The standard recalls the colors of the flag of Italy, with particular reference to the standard of the historic Italian Republic of 1802-1805; the square shape and the savoy blue border, whose use was maintained even in the Republican era, symbolize the Italian Armed Forces, which are commanded by the president. Blue in heraldry also metaphorically symbolizes command.

=== Stella d'Italia ===
Stella d'Italia

The Stella d'Italia ("Star of Italy"), popularly known as Stellone d'Italia ("Great Star of Italy"), is a five-pointed white star symbolizing Italy for many centuries. It is the oldest national symbol of Italy, since it dates back to Graeco-Roman tradition when Venus, associated with the West as an evening star, was hired to identify the Italian Peninsula. From an allegorical point of view, the Stella d'Italia metaphorically represents the shining destiny of Italy.

In the early 16th century it began to be frequently associated with Italia turrita, the national personification of the Italian Peninsula. The Stella d'Italia was adopted as part of the emblem of Italy in 1947, where it is superimposed on a steel cogwheel, all surrounded by an oak branch and an olive branch.

=== Strawberry tree ===
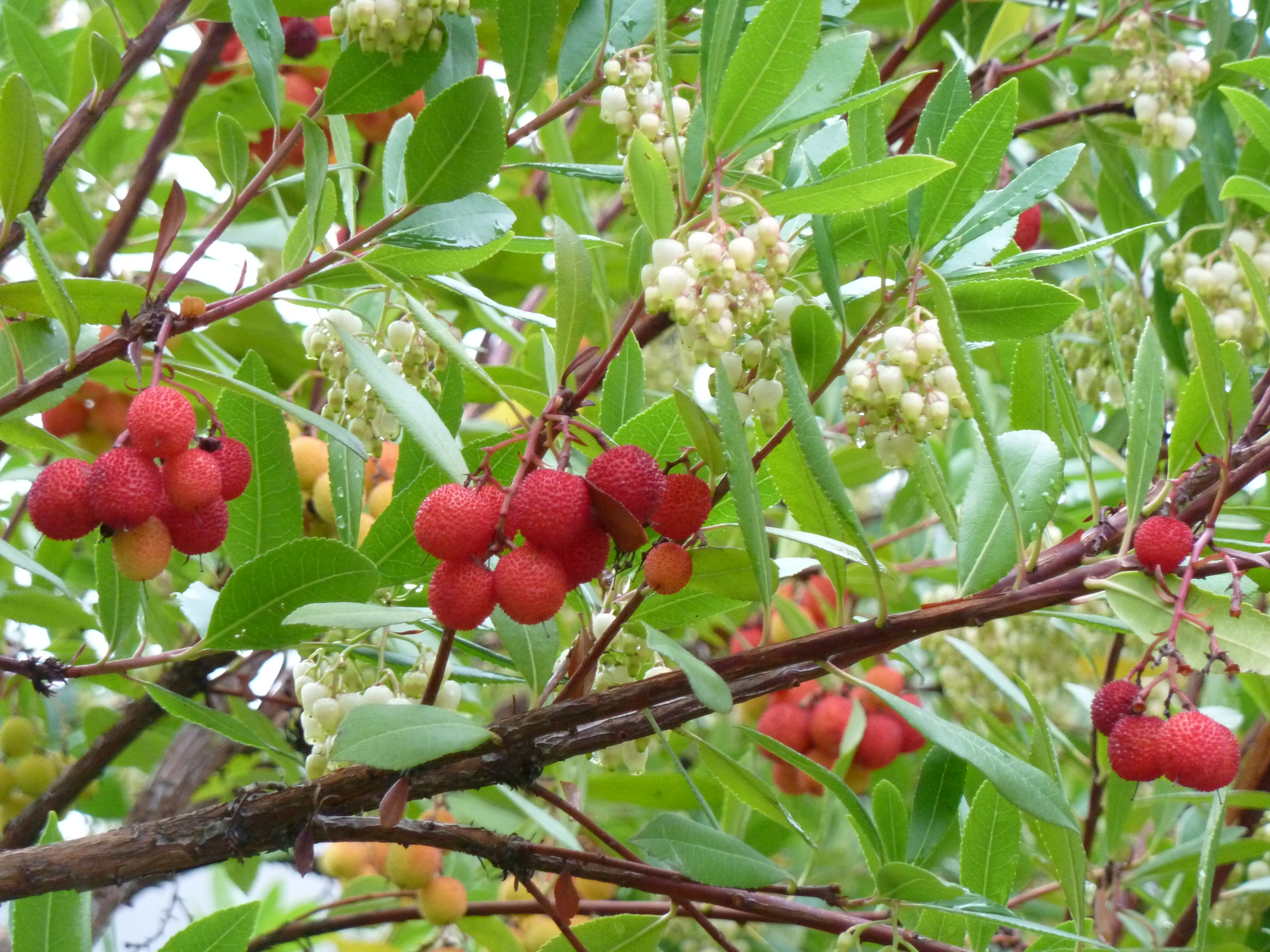
Strawberry tree

The strawberry tree began to be considered one of the national symbols of Italy in the 19th century, during the Italian unification, because with its autumn colours it recalls the flag of Italy (green for its leaves, white for its flowers and red for its berries). For this reason it is the national tree of Italy. The flower of the strawberry tree is the national flower of Italy.

== See also ==
- Symbols of Europe

== Bibliography ==
- Barbero, Alessandro (2015). Il divano di Istanbul (in Italian). Sellerio Editore. ISBN 978-88-389-3352-3.
- Bazzano, Nicoletta (2011). Donna Italia. L'allegoria della Penisola dall'antichità ai giorni nostri (in Italian). Angelo Colla Editore. ISBN 978-88-96817-06-3.
- Calabrese, Michele (2011). "Il Canto degli Italiani: genesi e peripezie di un inno". Quaderni del Bobbio (in Italian). 3.
- Luigino, Caliaro (2005). "Frecce Tricolori". Pattuglie acrobatiche. Mondovì: Edizioni Gribaudo. ISBN 88-8058-873-7.
- Rossi, Girolamo (2014). Lo scudo crociato. Un simbolo medievale nella comunicazione politica del Novecento (in Italian). Armando Editore. ISBN 9788866774198.
