= Italia turrita =

National personification or allegory of Italy

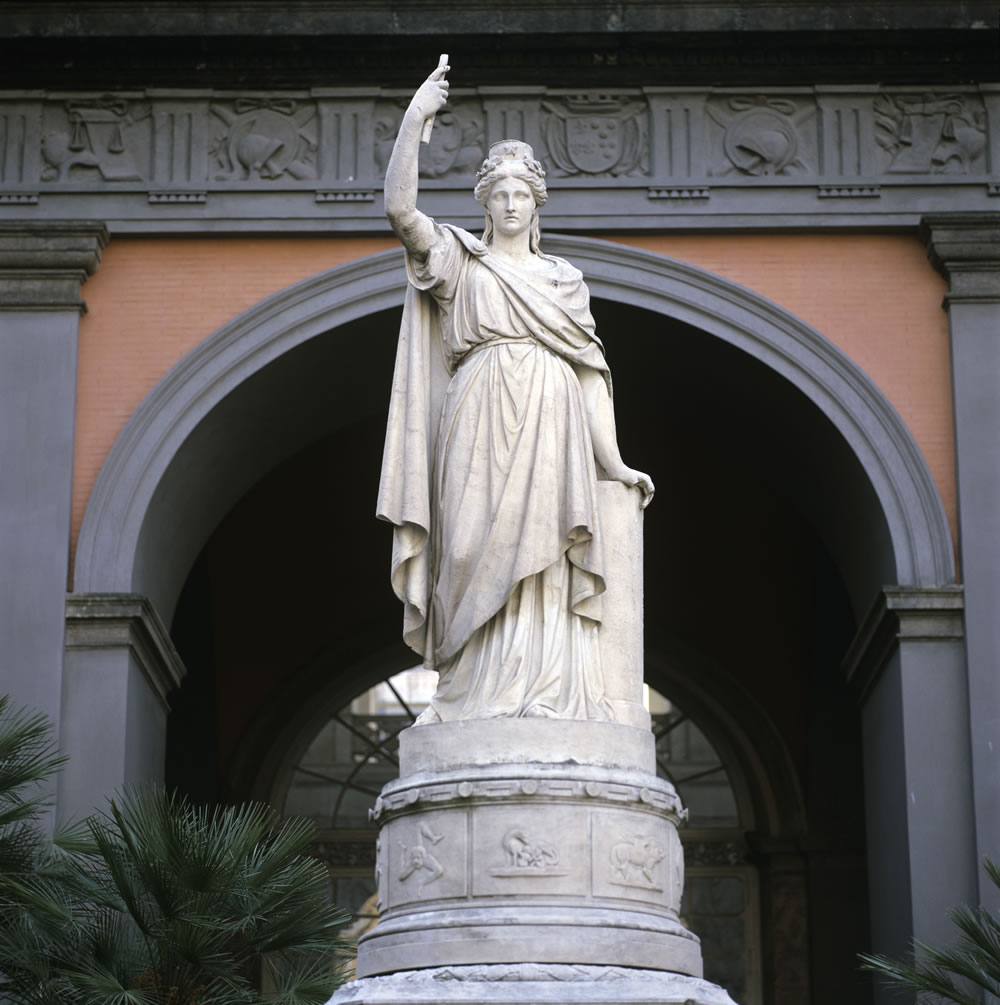
Statue of Italia turrita e stellata in Naples

Italia turrita (pronounced [iˈtaːlja turˈriːta]; lit. 'Turreted Italy') is the national personification or allegory of Italy, in the appearance of a young woman with her head surrounded by a mural crown completed by towers (hence turrita or "with towers" in Italian). It is often accompanied by the Stella d'Italia ('Star of Italy'), which is the oldest national symbol of Italy, since it dates back to the Graeco-Roman tradition, from which the so-called Italia turrita e stellata ('turreted and starry Italy'), and by other additional attributes, the most common of which is the cornucopia. The allegorical representation with the towers, which draws its origins from ancient Rome, is typical of Italian civic heraldry, so much so that the mural crown is also the symbol of the cities of Italy.

Italia turrita, which is one of the national symbols of Italy, has been widely depicted for centuries in the fields of art, politics and literature. Its most classic aspect, which derives from the primordial myth of the Great Mediterranean Mother and which was definitively specified at the turn of the 16th and 17th centuries by Cesare Ripa, wants to symbolically convey the royalty and nobility of Italian cities (thanks to the presence of crown turrita), the abundance of agricultural crops of the Italian Peninsula (represented by the cornucopia) and the shining destiny of Italy (symbolized by the Stella d'Italia).

== Appearance and representation ==
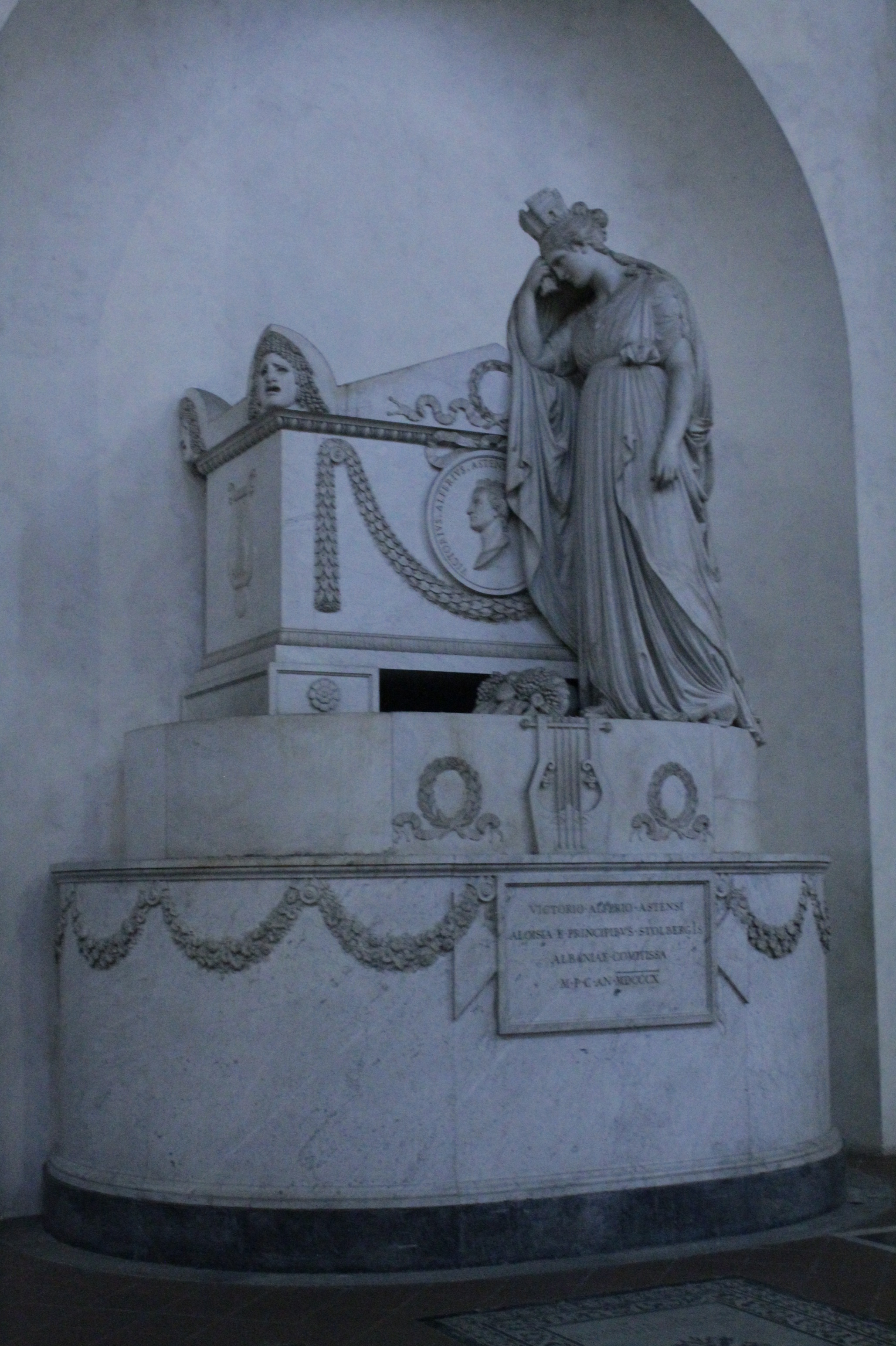
Italia turrita weeping on the tomb of Vittorio Alfieri, constructed by Antonio Canova 1757 – 1822

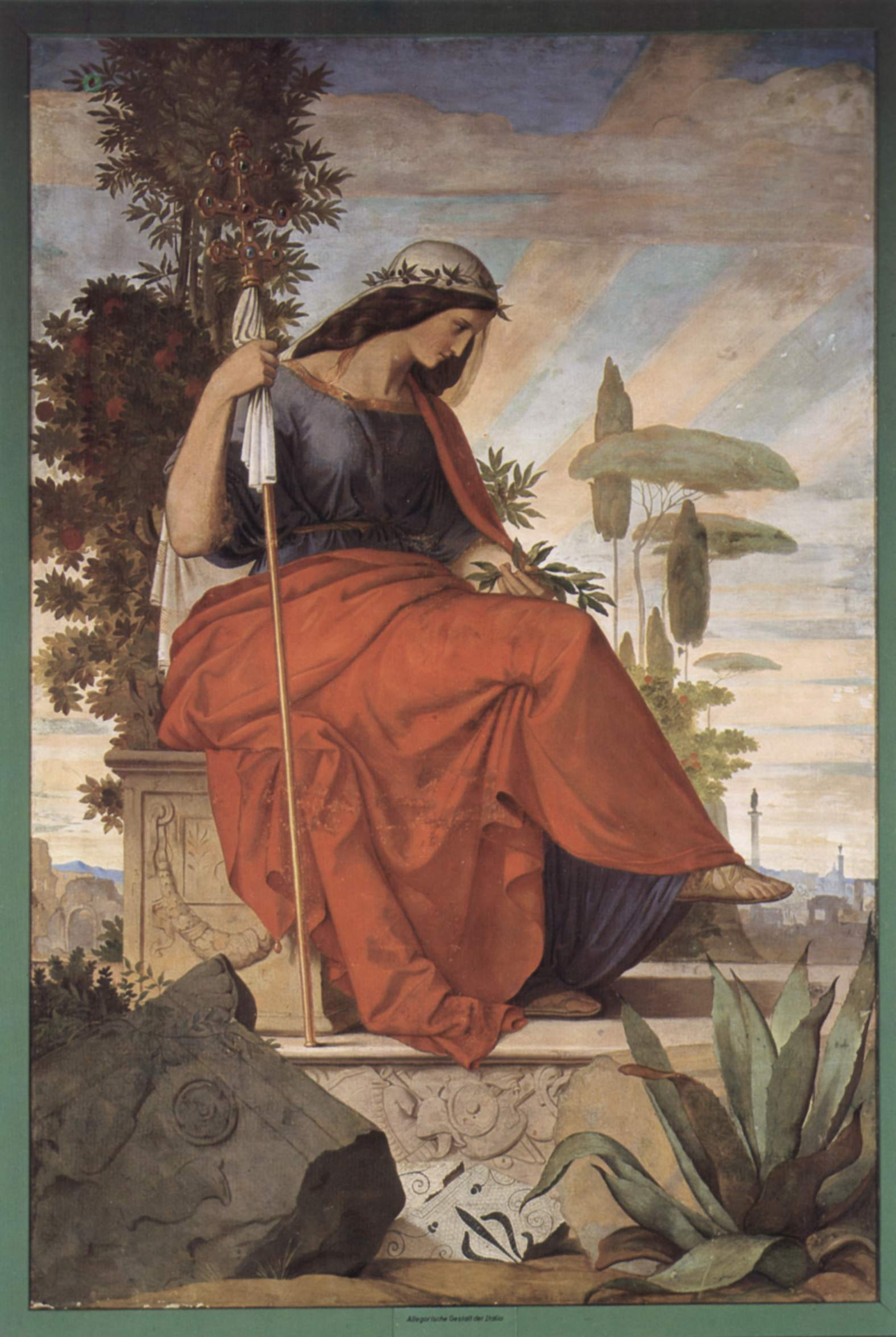
The allegorical personification of Italy in a painting by Philipp Veit, which was realized between 1834 and 1836 and which is kept at the Städelsches Kunstinstitut of Frankfurt am Main, in Germany

The personification of Italy is generally depicted as a woman with a rather luxuriant body, with typical Mediterranean attributes, such as colored complexion and dark hair. Throughout history it has repeatedly changed the attributes with which it is characterized: a bunch of wheat ears in hand (symbol of fertility and reference to the agricultural economy of the Italian peninsula), a sword or a scale, metaphors of justice, or a cornucopia, allegory of abundance; during fascism it also supported one of the symbols of this political movement, the fasces.

After the birth of the Italian flag, which occurred in 1797, it is frequently shown with a green, white and red dress. Above the head of the towered Italy is often depicted a five-pointed star, the so-called Stella d'Italia (symbolizing the shining destiny of Italy), which since the Risorgimento is one of the symbols of the Italian Peninsula, from 1948 the dominant element of the emblem of the Italian Republic. When it is accompanied by the Stella d'Italia, which is the oldest national symbol of Italy, since it dates back to the Graeco-Roman tradition, is called Italia turrita e stellata ('turreted and starry Italy'). The association of the star with Italy is first found in the Iliupersis of Stesichorus, and then in the works of Virgil and other poets. It was added above the personification of Italy in the late imperial era.

However, the classic representation of Italia turrita, originated from a coin minted under the Roman emperor Antoninus Pius, the exhibition sitting on a globe and holding a cornucopia and a scepter in his hand. Over the centuries the iconography of the towered Italy had a constant evolution with the addition and elimination of various attributes: the final version of the personification of the Italian peninsula was defined at the turn of the 16th and 17th centuries thanks to Cesare Ripa.

The classical aspect of Italia turrita, which originates from the primordial myth of the Great Mediterranean Mother, symbolically transmits, according to the presence or absence of some attributes, the royalty and nobility of Italian cities (thanks to the turreted crown), the abundance of the agricultural crops of the Italian peninsula (represented by the cornucopia), the natural wealth of the Italian peninsula (symbolized by the rich mantle), the domination of Italy over the world (symbolized by the globe, which is the allegory of the two periods during which the Italian peninsula was at the center of history: the Roman era and the Rome of the popes), domination over other nations (represented by the scepter) and Italy's shining destiny (thanks to the presence of the Italian Star).

== Places of representation ==
Italia turrita has been depicted throughout history in many national contexts: stamps, honors, coins, monuments, on the passport and, more recently, on the back of the Italian identity card.

The allegory of Italy is also present in the scrolls of numerous ancient maps. On maps she appeared for the first time in 1595 on a map contained in the Parergon, a geographical work by Giacomo Gastaldi; then on a work by Willem Blaeu published in 1635, with the wall crown surmounted by a luminous six-pointed star. Among the most striking images of the personification of the Italian peninsula is that shown in the general map of Italy by Jean-Dominique Cassini, which was published in 1793.

== History ==
=== In ancient Rome ===
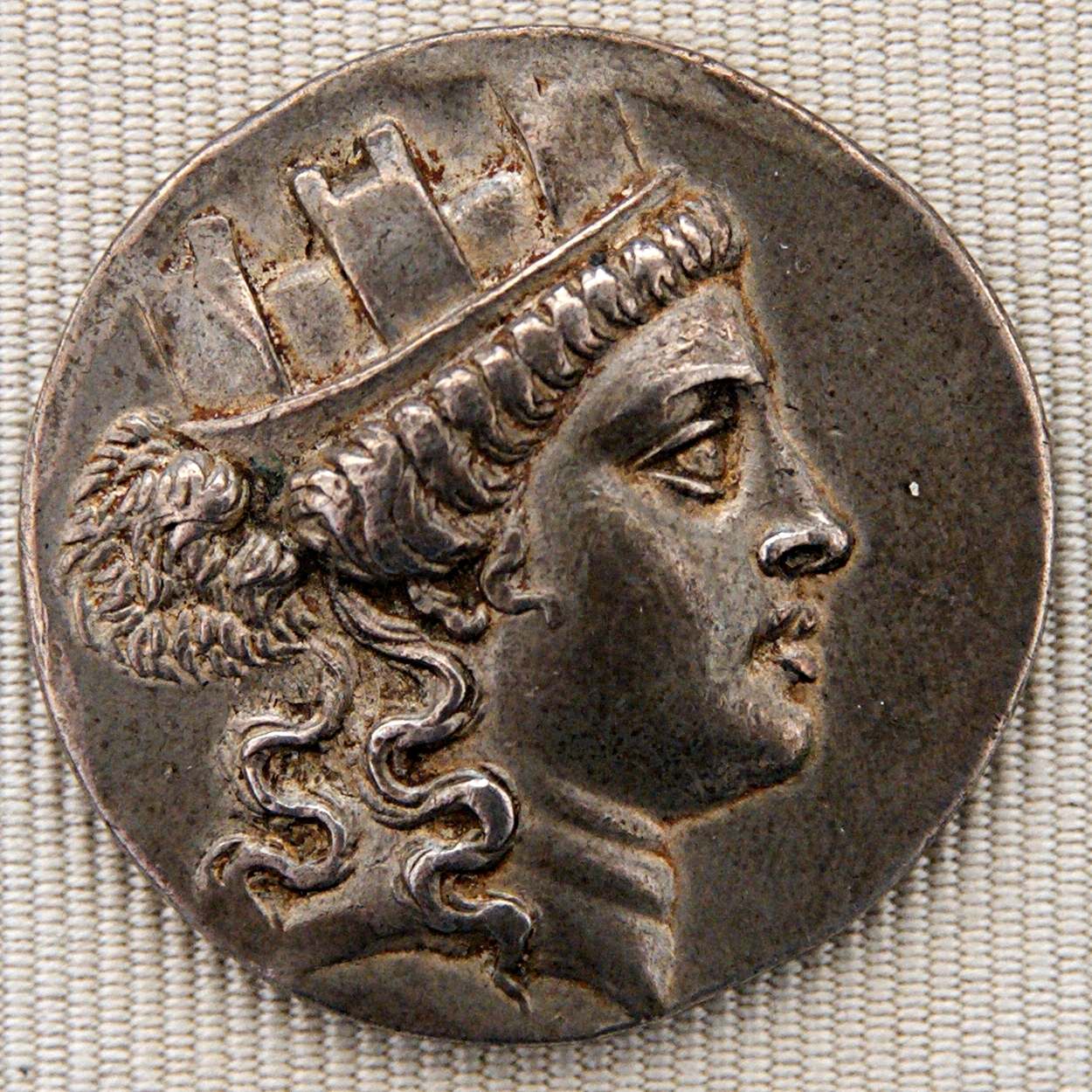
Tetradrachm of Smyrna (160 BC - 150 BC), depicting the profile face of the goddess Cybele, where the mural crown is clearly evident

Ancient sources mention the existence of a picta Italia ("painted Italy") at the Temple of Tellus in ancient Rome, dating back to 268 BC; this painting has not survived, it could have been either a map or an allegorical personification of Italy.

The origin of the turreted woman is linked to the figure of Cybele, a deity of fertility of Anatolian origin, in whose representations she wears a wall crown. During the Second Punic War (218 BC - 202 BC), while Hannibal was raging in Italy, the Roman priests predicted that Rome would be saved only if the image of Cybele, that is of the goddess of Mount Ida, had arrived in the surroundings of Troy. The image, a black stone preserved in Pessinus, was transported to Rome and placed inside the Temple of Victory. The Roman army then defeated Hannibal and the city was saved.

Since then Cybele became one of the deities of Rome, the Magna Mater ("Great Mother"), although his cult was opposed because it contained orgiastic rites. The importance of Cybele in the Roman religion became very strong when Virgil wrote the Aeneid (31 BC - 19 BC), telling how the journey of Aeneas was also protected by the goddess, who provided the wood of the trees and saved the ships from the fire of Turnus.

Also thanks to the events of the Social War (91 BC - 88 BC), which saw opposing Rome and the Italic municipia, the figure of Cybele then began to represent the idea of a peaceful and united Italy under Roman rule, as Aeneas had pacified the Latin peoples, as well as the sacred space of the pomerium, now extended to the whole peninsula. During the Social War an allegorical personification of Italy appeared on a coin minted by Corfinium, capital of the socii that rebelled to have Roman citizenship extended to all of Italy, although not yet provided with the turreted crown.

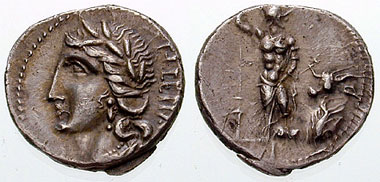
Denarius of 89 BC coined by the Marsi. On the left, the representation of "Italy" with the laurel wreath

During the Roman Empire, the women of the imperial family began to dress, in official depictions, as Cybele, that is, with a turreted crown. This image merged with the allegorical personification of the peninsula, increasingly becoming the symbol of Italy.

The representation of Italia turrita was introduced by emperor Trajan, who had it sculpted on his Arch erected in Benevento in 114–117. Afterwards, from 130 AD on, under the emperors Hadrian, Antoninus Pius, Marcus Aurelius, Commodus, Septimius Severus and Caracalla, Roman coins reproduced the allegorical representation of Italy as a dressed and towered woman who sometimes carries a cornucopia. During the reign of Antoninus Pius a sestertius was coined representing Italy as a turreted woman, sitting on a globe and holding a cornucopia in one hand while in the other the command stick.

The globe and scepter represent Italia as having sovereignty over the world as the homeland of the Romans, while the cornucupia was a symbol of wealth and abundance. The mural crown was a symbol of the Roman Civitas. Following the fall of the Roman empire, Italia Turrita remained a classic image used for the allegorical personification of Italy.

=== From the Middle Ages to 18th century ===
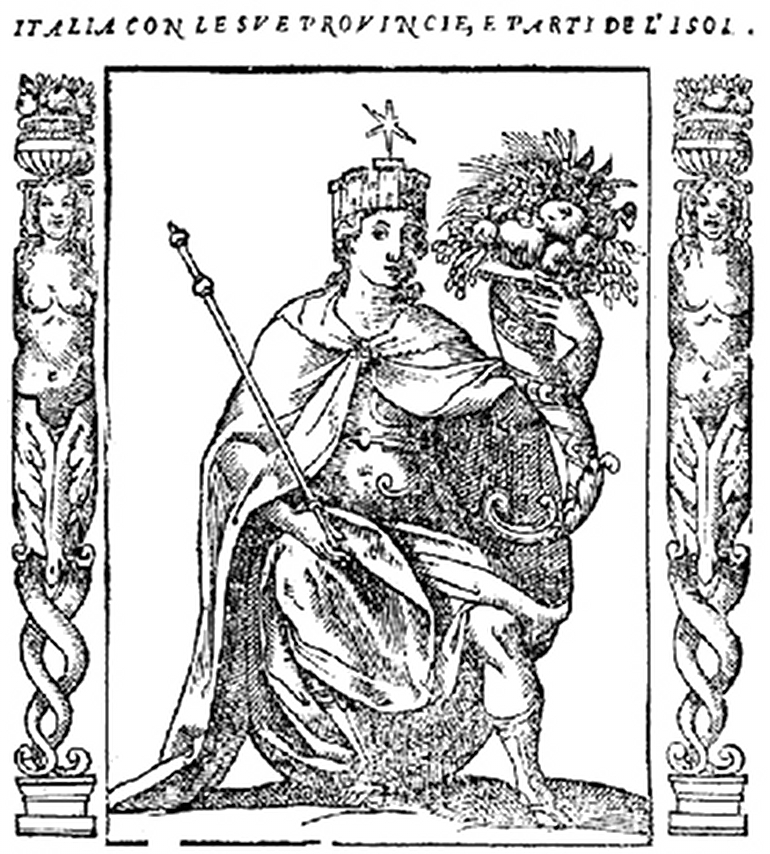
The Italia turrita by Cesare Ripa. We can see, above the allegorical personification, the Stella d'Italia ("Star of Italy"), which symbolizes the shining destiny of Italy, and also the cornucopia, the other attribute.

In the centuries following the fall of the Western Roman Empire, the Italian peninsula lost its political and administrative unity, shattering into multiple autonomous state. In the early Middle Ages period, the personification of Italy in a turreted woman almost completely disappeared from the collective imagination, limiting itself to appear rarely but without having those distinctive features, such as the walls or the cornucopia, which had so characterized it in Roman times.

Italia turrita was rediscovered at the beginning of the 14th century, shortly after the Medieval commune, when the first signoria began to be born. From the Middle Ages the allegorical depiction of Italy began to transmit torture and despair: the country, in fact, was no longer the absolute protagonist of those important political and military events that they had characterized ancient Roman history so much. This personification of Italy, however, is not associated with the entire peninsula, but only with territories that were de jure part of the Kingdom of Italy, which were split into numerous de facto independent states that were experiencing convulsive political phases that needed, according to many, a peacemaker.

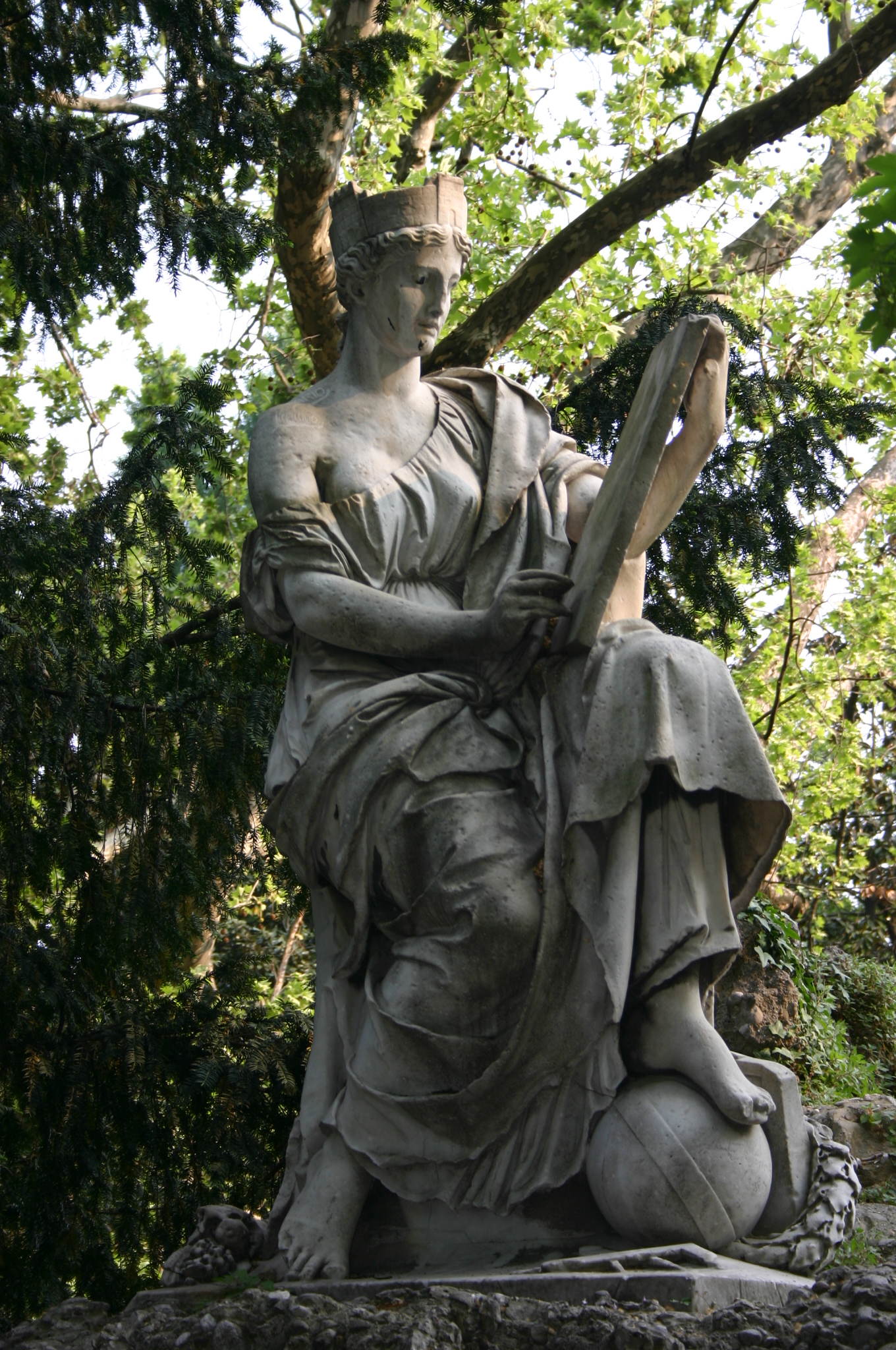
Italia turrita sitting on a globe statue in the Giardini Pubblici Indro Montanelli, Milan

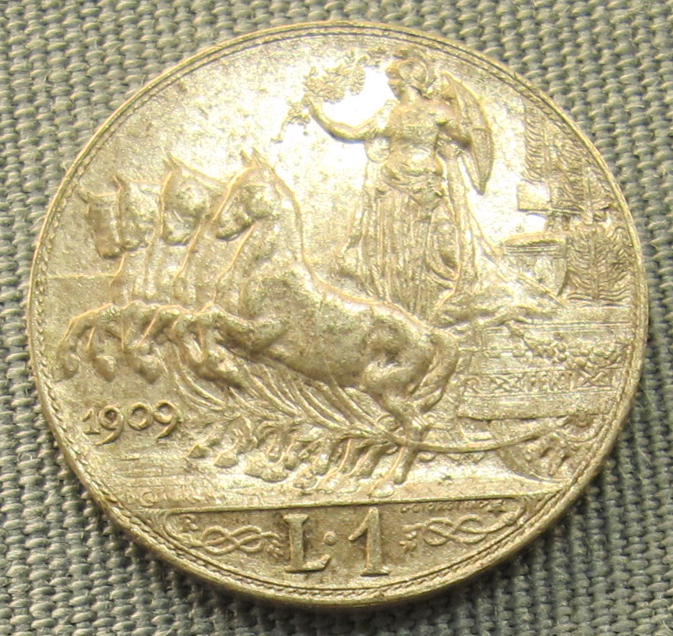
Allegorical personification of Italy on a 1 lira silver coin from 1909

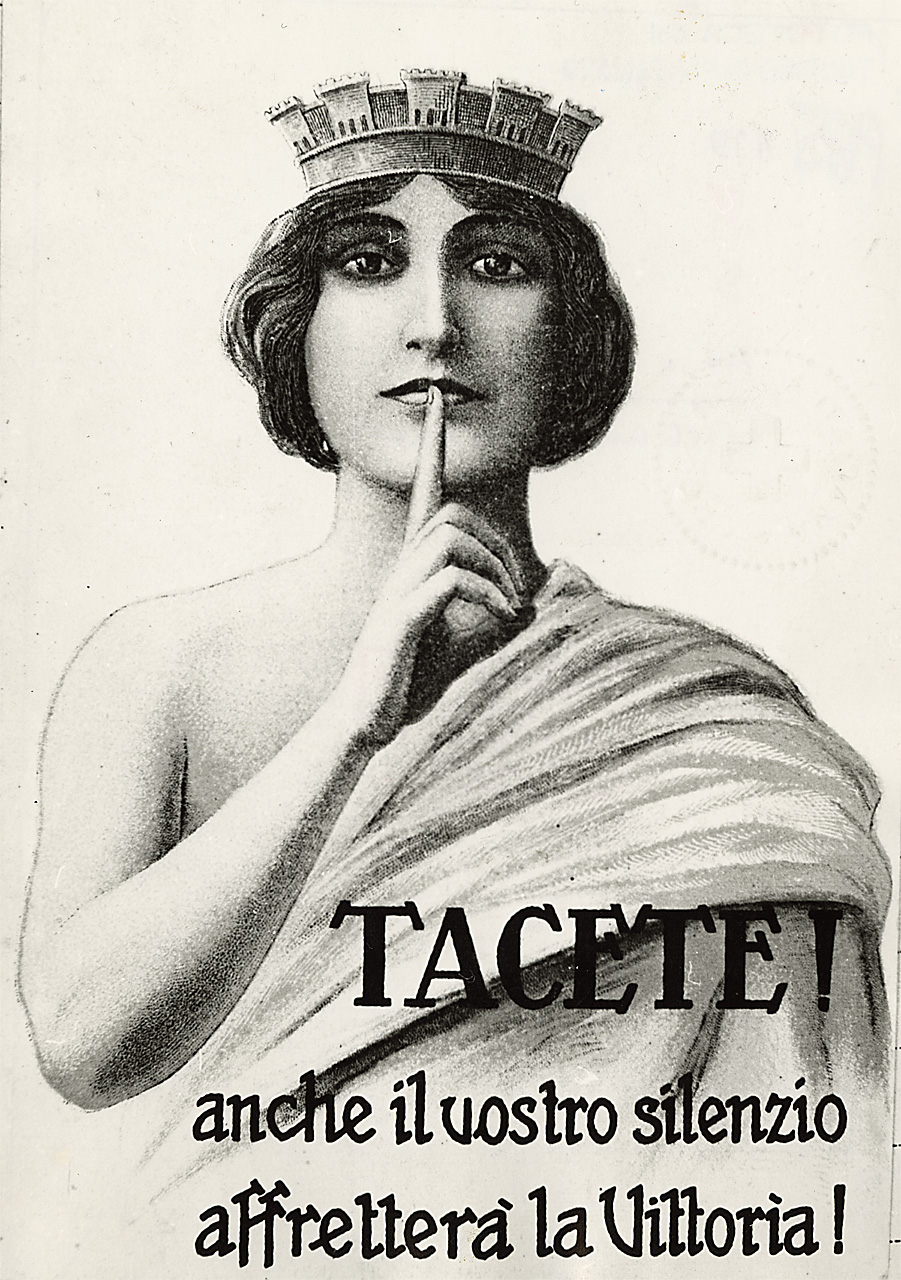
Poster of the First World War in which the Italia turrita invites to keep quiet so as not to divulge secrets to the enemy ("Shut up! Even your silence hastens Victory")

The representation continued to be nostalgic of past glories even during the Renaissance and Humanism, as well as during the descents of foreign armies in the Italian Wars of the 16th century. In 1490, Ludovico Sforza, duke of Milan, had an Italia turrita painted on a medallion of the castle in Piazza Ducale, Vigevano. The Caesaris Astrum appeared again in 1574 on the cover of Historiarium de Regno Italiae, a book written by the historian Carlo Sigonio.

The first to resume a figure of Italia turrita more similar to that of the ancient age was Cesare Ripa in the 17th century, who describes it, in his Iconologia, as in the sestertius of Antoninus Pius, also combining them with a star that shines above his head: the reason for this association lies in the fact that in ancient Greece Italy was joined by the Star of Venus, being the Italian Peninsula located west of Greece. The Star of Venus is in fact visible on the horizon, immediately after sunset, in the west. Cesare Ripa definitively specified the characteristics of the Italia turrita, characteristics that have come down to us:

[...] A beautiful woman dressed in a sumptuous dress, and rich with a mantle on top, and sitting on a globe, has crowned the head of towers, and walls, with the right hand she holds a scepter, or an auction, which with the one, and with the other, is shown in the aforementioned Medals, and with the left hand a cornucopia full of different fruits, and beyond that we will do again, having a beautiful star above the head [...] (Note: [...] Una bellissima donna vestita d'Habito sontuoso, e ricco con un manto sopra, e siede sopra un globo, ha coronata la testa di torri, e di muraglie, con la destra mano tiene uno scettro, overo un'hasta, che con l'uno, e con l'altra vien dimostrata nelle sopra dette Medaglie, e con la sinistra mano un cornucopia pieno di diversi frutti, e oltre ciò faremo anco, che habbia sopra la testa una bellissima stella. [...])

— Cesare Ripa, Iconologia, 1603

=== From the unification of Italy to republican Italy ===
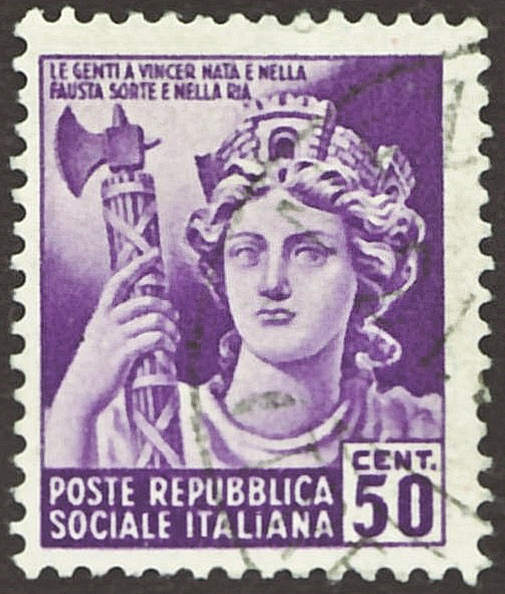
A stamp from the Italian Social Republic, depicting Italia turrita holding a fasces

Italia turrita recovered the solemn aura in the 19th century, becoming one of the symbols of the Italian unification, during which it was often represented as a prisoner, that is, subjected to the foreign powers that dominated the country at the time, or extolling the call to arms with the aim to encourage the Italian people to actively participate in the process of unification of the country; the iconography of the allegorical personification of Italy, during the Italian unification period, was also used in propaganda vignettes for political purposes.

It is from this period that most of the marble statues representing Italia turrita were built; the erection of monuments to the allegorical personification of the country continued even after the three wars of independence.

When unity of Italy was completed, the iconography of the Italia turrita was overcome by the myth of the history of ancient Rome; it is not in fact a case that in the group of statues present at the Altare della Patria in Rome the allegorical personification of Italy surrounded by a mural crown with towers is absent.

This tendency to relegate Italia turrita to a supporting role, which began in 1870 with the capture of Rome, was also confirmed during fascism, which made the call of Roman history one of the cornerstones of the regime.

In these decades the allegorical representation of Italy was not particularly widespread in the official architecture, with the placement of statues inside the most important buildings, but was limited to the marble monuments realized in various Italian cities, to the philatelic emission and to propaganda, especially those related to the initial neutrality and the subsequent participation of Italy in the First World War.

The iconography of the allegorical personification of Italy was resumed in the second post-war period: in 1946 the supporters of the republic chose the effigy of the Italia turrita as their unitary symbol to be used in the electoral campaign and on the referendum card on the institutional form of the State, in contrast to the Savoy coat of arms, which represented the monarchy.

After the proclamation of the Republic, which saw Italia turrita as the protagonist, the iconography of the allegorical representation of the country returned to sporadic appearances; appeared on stamps (including the series called "Siracusana"), coins, stamp duty and cartoons.

== Stella d'Italia ==
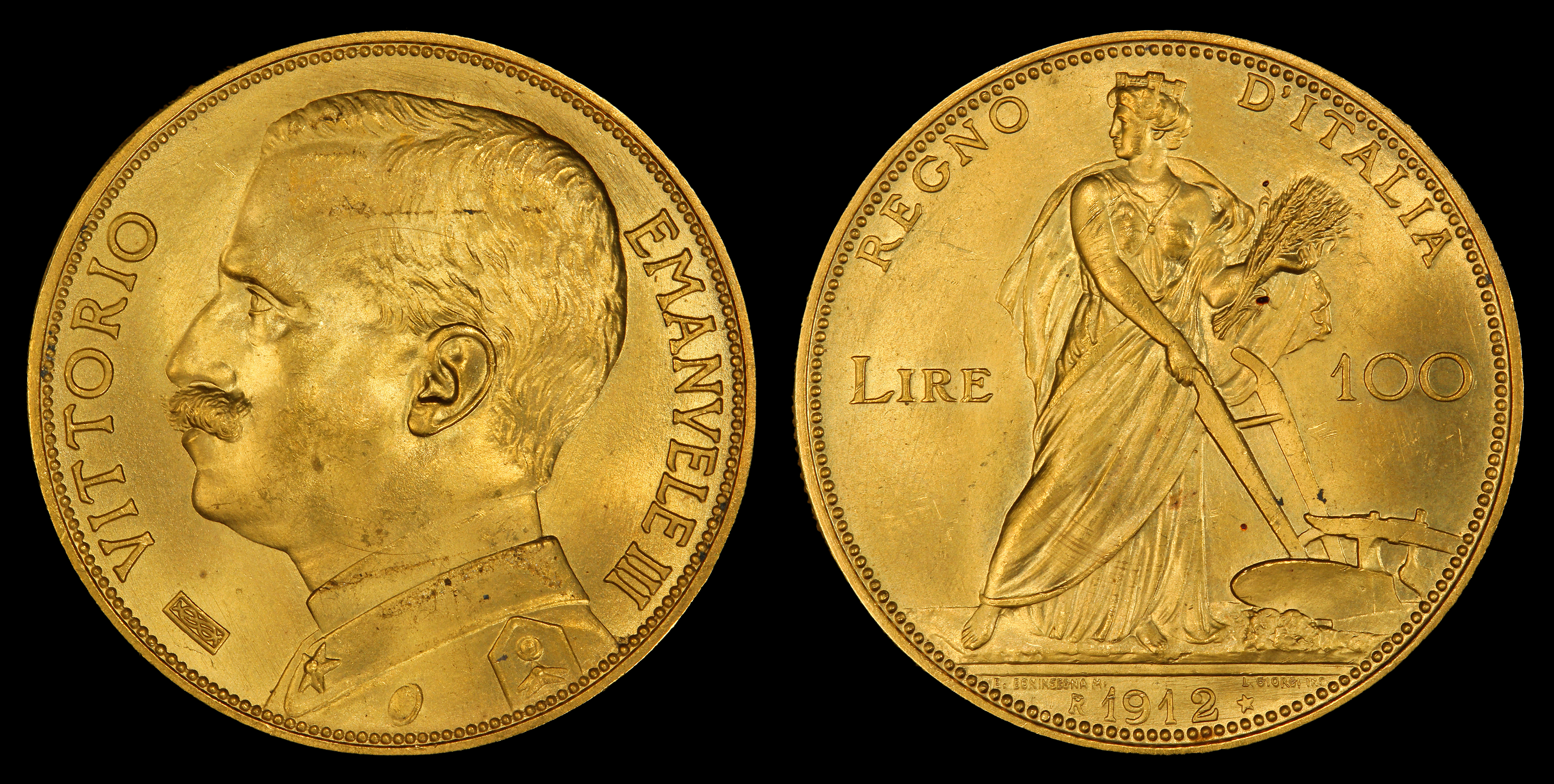
Personification of Italy on a 100 lire gold coin from 1912

Over the head of Italia turrita, a five-pointed star is usually seen shining radiant; an ancient secular symbol of Italy purported to protect the nation, known as Stella d'Italia ("Star of Italy"). Iconographic of the Italian unification, it was used as the crest of the armorial bearings of the Kingdom of Italy from 1870 to 1890 and is the dominant element in the modern day emblem of Italy adopted at the birth of the Italian Republic in 1948. The Stella d'Italia symbolizes the shining destiny of Italy.

== Cornucopia ==
Prior to the conceptualization of Italia turrita, Roman Italy was often personified as a woman holding a cornucopia, symbol of wealth and abundance. Such symbolism continued and several coins depicted Italia turrita, seated on a globe, holding a sceptre and a cornucopia.

== See also ==
- Emblem of Italy
- National personification
- Mural crown
- Stella d'Italia
- Roma (mythology)
