= Five-pointed star =

Common ideogram in modern culture

A five-pointed star

A five-pointed star (☆), geometrically an equilateral concave decagon, is a common ideogram in modern culture. Comparatively rare in classical heraldry, it was notably introduced for the flag of the United States in the Flag Act of 1777 and since has become widely used in flags.

It has also become a symbol of fame or "stardom" in Western culture, among other uses.

== History of use ==
=== Early history ===
The Egyptian hieroglyph representing "star" had five points (N14 N14), while the "star" sign in Mesopotamian cuneiform had eight.

Sopdet, the Egyptian personification of the star Sirius, is always shown with the five-pointed star hieroglyph on her head.

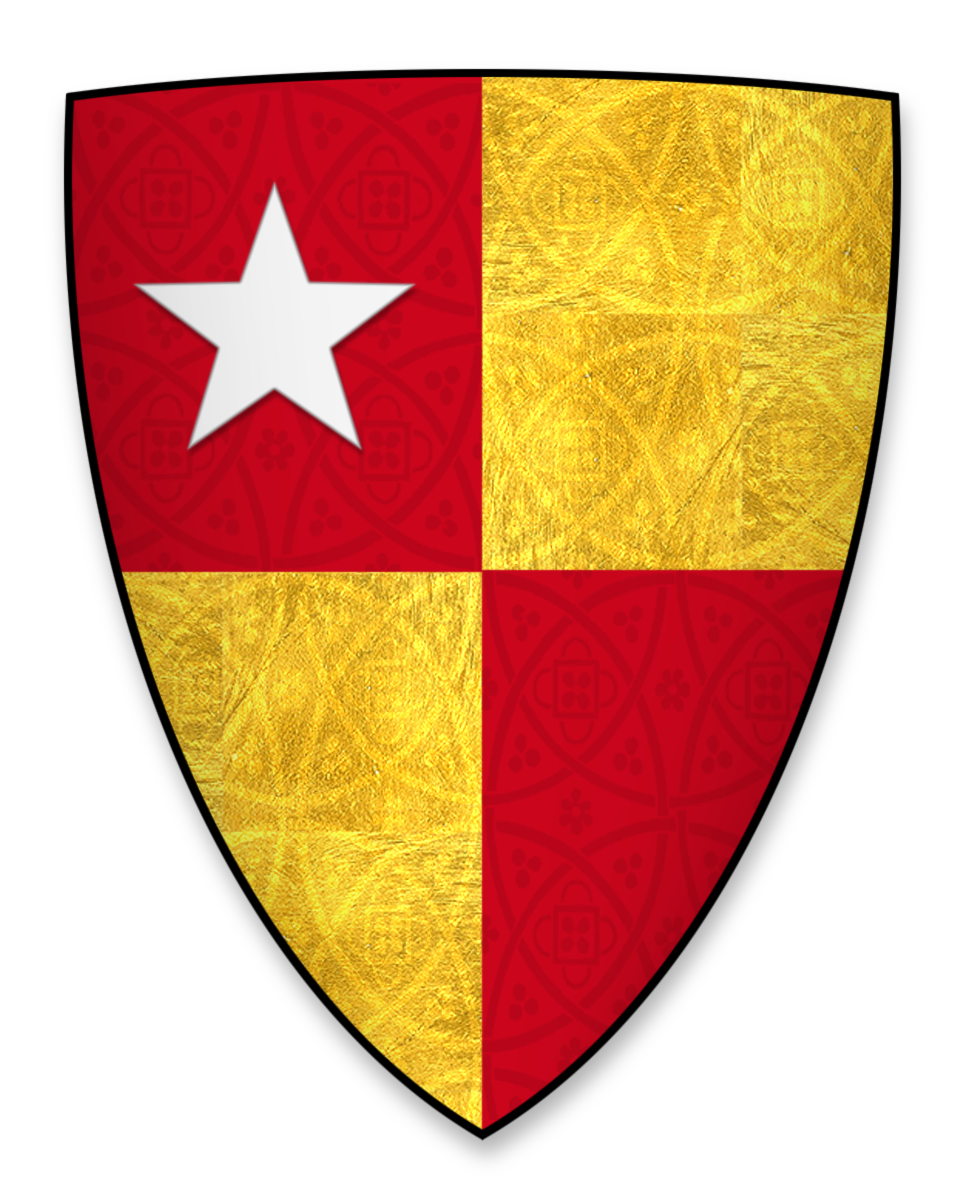
Arms Hugh de Vere, 4th Earl of Oxford (d. 1263) as shown by Matthew Paris (c. 1250)

The five-pointed star is the oldest symbol of Italy. Venus represented the West and was, in Classical mythology, the symbol of the Italian Peninsula, which was western to Greece.

The star (or mullet) is comparatively rare in medieval heraldry, but from an early time, the five-pointed star was preferred in English and Scottish heraldry (e.g. in the Dering Roll, c. 1270), while the preferred number of points in German heraldry was six.

The star in the coat of arms of the De Vere family was in legend attributed to the First Crusade, when "a white star [...] did light and arrest upon the standard of Aubre de Vere". The de Vere star is notorious in English history, because in the Battle of Barnet in 1471, the star badge of the Earl of Oxford was mistaken for the sun badge of Edward IV by the Earl of Warwick, so that he erroneously attacked his own ally, losing the battle, which probably changed the outcome of the entire War of the Roses.

=== Modern flags and emblems ===
The Betsy Ross flag from 1777

The five-pointed stars on the flag of the United States were introduced in the Flag Act of 1777. The Flag Act did not specify any particular arrangement, number of points, nor orientation for the stars and the arrangement. Some flag makers arranged the stars into one big star, in a circle or in rows and some replaced a state's star with its initial. One arrangement features 13 five-pointed stars arranged in a circle, with the stars arranged pointing outwards from the circle (as opposed to up), the so-called Betsy Ross flag. The American flag shown in the painting Surrender of Lord Cornwallis by John Trumbull (c. 1820, depicting an event of 1781) shows twelve stars arranged along the outline of a rectangle with an additional star in the center.

Five-pointed stars became more frequently used in the 19th century. The coat of arms of Valais, adopted for the Rhodanic Republic (1802), was designed with twelve five-pointed stars. The flag of Chile, introduced in 1817, has a single five-pointed star known as La Estrella Solitaria (The Lone Star). The similar flag of Texas was introduced in 1839. The star and crescent used by the Ottoman Empire was shown with an eight-pointed stars in early forms (18th century), but was changed to a five-pointed star in the official flag in 1844. Numerous other national or regional flags adopted five-pointed star designs in the later 19th to early 20th century, including Venezuela (1859), Honduras (1866), Puerto Rico (1895), Philippines (1898), Cuba (1902), Panama (1925), Jordan (1928) and Pakistan (1947). The pre-2024 Flags of Minnesota and 1901 Maine Flag both utilized the 5-pointed design.

In the 19th century the five-pointed star, which has always represented Italy, is on the copper cents coins of Vittorio Emanuele II king of Italy. Even today we find the five-pointed star in the emblem of the Italian Republic.

The five-pointed star also came to be widely used in military badges in the 19th century. A red star was used as the badge of XII Corps of the Union Army in the American Civil War, while VII Corps used a five-pointed star in a crescent. In 1916, a five-pointed red star was used by the U.S. Army Signal Corps' aviation section.

The U.S. tradition of barnstars, decorative five-pointed stars attached to buildings, appears to have arisen in Pennsylvania after the Civil War, and became widespread by the 1930s.

The Swiss 1 and 2 francs coins introduced in 1874–5 showed the figure of Helvetia surrounded by 22 stars, enumerating the Swiss cantons (in 1983 changed to 23 stars to reflect the creation of the canton of Jura).

The green five-pointed star used as a symbol of Esperanto was first proposed in 1890.

The five-pointed Red Star as a symbol of communism was adopted during the Russian Civil War of 1917–1922, but its exact origin is unclear. The red star was featured on the state emblem of the Soviet Union since 1923 and has been in use in North Korea since 1948. Another variant is a yellow (golden) star on red background, as on the state emblem of Vietnam (1945) and the People's Republic of China (1949), as well as on the flags of most Communist countries. In the 1930s, red luminescent Kremlin stars were installed on five towers of the Moscow Kremlin, replacing gilded eagles that had symbolized Imperial Russia. Since then, it is customary to install similarly looking red stars atop New Year trees in the Soviet Union, a tradition that continues to this day in Russia.

In the Emblem of Italy, adopted in 1947, the five-pointed star represents the "Star of Italy".

The Flag of Europe, designed in 1955 on behalf of the Council of Europe (CoE) and adopted by the European Communities in 1985 (and thus inherited as the flag of the European Union upon its creation in 1993) has a circle of twelve yellow (gold) stars on a blue (azure) field.

=== Other uses in modern culture ===
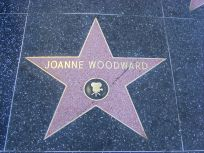
The Hollywood Walk of Fame star for actress Joanne Woodward

The use of "star" for theatrical lead performers dates to 1824, giving rise to the concept of "stardom" in the film industry. The Hollywood Walk of Fame, where famous entertainers are honored with pink terrazzo five-pointed stars along Hollywood Boulevard, was introduced in 1958.

In association football, there is a tradition of using five-pointed stars in team badges to represent victories. The first team to adopt such a star was Juventus, in 1958, to represent their tenth Italian Football Championship and Serie A title. The star was later formally adopted by some organisations as a symbol for ten titles, and the ratio of one star for ten titles has become the most common arrangement.

Five-pointed stars may be used on elevators to indicate the ground level or lobby of a building.

They are also used on various police, fire, and paramedic badges.

=== Heraldry ===
Emblem of Italy, with the central Stella d'Italia. The emblem, shaped as a Roman wreath, comprises a white five-pointed star, the Stella d'Italia (English: "Star of Italy"), which is the oldest national symbol of Italy, since it dates back to the Graeco-Roman tradition.

The Stella d'Italia ("Star of Italy"), popularly known as Stellone d'Italia ("Great Star of Italy"), is a five-pointed white star, which has symbolized Italy for many centuries. It is the oldest national symbol of Italy, since it dates back to Graeco-Roman mythology when Venus, associated with the West as an evening star, was adopted to identify the Italian Peninsula. From an allegorical point of view, the Stella d'Italia metaphorically represents the shining destiny of Italy.

In the early 16th century it began to be frequently associated with Italia turrita, the national personification of the Italian peninsula. The Stella d'Italia was adopted as part of the emblem of Italy in 1947, where it is superimposed on a steel cogwheel, all surrounded by an oak branch and an olive branch. From an allegorical point of view, the Star of Italy metaphorically represents the shining destiny of Italy. Its unifying value is equal to that of the flag of Italy. In 1947, the Stella d'Italia was inserted at the center of the emblem of Italy, which was designed by Paolo Paschetto and which is the iconic symbol identifying the Italian State.

The Italian Star is also recalled by some honors. The Italian Star is recalled by the Colonial Order of the Star of Italy, decoration of the Kingdom of Italy which was intended to celebrate the Italian Empire, as well as by the Order of the Star of Italian Solidarity, the first decoration established by Republican Italy, which was replaced in 2011 by the Order of the Star of Italy, second civil honorary title in importance of the Italian State. The Star of Italy is also recalled by the stars worn on the collars of Italian military uniforms and appears on the figurehead of the Italian Navy. In the civil sphere, the Italian Star is the central symbol of the emblem of the Club Alpino Italiano.

The symbolism of a star associated with Italy first appeared in the writings of the ancient Greek poet Stesicoro, from whom it passed on to poets such as Virgil. The oldest national symbol of Italy, it originated from the combination of Venus, as an evening star, with the West and therefore with the Italian peninsula, one of which was Esperia, or "land of Hesperus, the star of the Evening consecrated to Venus". This symbolism was already attested in archaic Greek literature, in 6th century BC by the poet Stesichorus, in the poem Iliupersis (Fall of Troy) that created the legend of Aeneas which described his return to the land of his ancestors (Italy) after the defeat of Troy, under the leadership of Venus.

== Relation to the pentagram ==
A pentagram

As a symbol or emblem, the five-pointed star, or mullet of five points, arises from classical heraldry, and it shares none of the esoteric or occult associations given to the pentagram, or "Seal of Solomon", since at least the Renaissance period.

The two emblems are frequently associated, or identified, in contemporary conspiracy theories, especially referencing the use of five-pointed stars in the flags of the United States and European Union.

== List of national flags ==
=== Americas ===
Brazil

Chile

Cuba

Dominica

Grenada

Honduras

Panama

Saint Kitts and Nevis

Suriname

United States

Venezuela

=== Africa ===
Algeria

Angola

Burkina Faso

Cameroon

Cape Verde

Central African Republic

Comoros

Djibouti

DR Congo

Ethiopia

Ghana

Guinea-Bissau

Liberia

Libya

Mauritania

Morocco

Mozambique

Sao Tome and Principe

Senegal

Somalia

South Sudan

Togo

Tunisia

Zimbabwe

=== Asia ===
China

Myanmar

North Korea

Pakistan

Philippines

Singapore

Syria

Tajikistan

Timor-Leste

Turkey

Turkmenistan

Uzbekistan

Vietnam

=== Australia and Oceania ===
Australia

Federated States of Micronesia

New Zealand

Papua New Guinea

Samoa

Solomon Islands

Tuvalu

=== Europe ===
Bosnia and Herzegovina

Kosovo

== See also ==
- Arabic star – Punctuation mark used for Arabic
- List of symbols
- Nautical star – Symbol representing the North Star
- Pentagram – Five-pointed star polygon
- Red star – Symbol associated with communist ideology; also used by United States pioneering military aircraft in early 1916
- Star (grapheme) – Typographical symbol
- Star (heraldry) – Heraldic symbol
- Star polygon – Regular non-convex polygon
- Star polygons in art and culture – Polygons as symbolic elements
- Starfish – Class of echinoderms, marine animal
- Starfruit – Fruit
- The Five Star Stories – Japanese comic book series
- United States military aircraft national insignia (mostly used five-pointed stars since 1916)

== Unicode ==
Unicode provides various symbols incorporating a five-pointed star:

Symbol	Name	Code point
٭	Arabic five-pointed star[a]	U+066D
🌟	Glowing Star	U+1F31F
🌠	Shooting Star	U+1F320
⁎	Low asterisk	U+204E
≛	Star Equals	U+225B
⋆	Star Operator	U+22C6
⍟	APL functional Symbol Circle Star	U+235F
⍣	APL functional Symbol Star diaeresis	U+2363
★	Black Star	U+2605
☆	White Star	U+2606
☪	star and crescent	U+262A
⚝	outlined white star	U+269D
⛤	Pentagram	U+26E4
⛥	Right-Handed Interlaced Pentagram	U+26E5
⛦	Left-Handed Interlaced Pentagram	U+26E6
⛧	Inverted Pentagram	U+26E7
✩	Stress Outlined White Star	U+2729
✪	Circled White Star	U+272A
✫	Open Center Black Star	U+272B
✬	Black Center White Star	U+272C
✭	Outlined Black Star	U+272D
✮	Heavy Outlined Black Star	U+272E
✯	Pinwheel Star	U+272F
✰	Shadowed White Star	U+2730
⭐	White Medium Star	U+2B50
⭑	Black Small Star	U+2B51
⭒	White Small Star	U+2B52
＊	Full Width Asterisk	U+FF0A
🟉	Light Five Pointed Black Star	U+1F7C9
🟊	Heavy Five Pointed Black Star	U+1F7CA

== Bibliography ==
- Bazzano, Nicoletta (2011). Donna Italia. L'allegoria della Penisola dall'antichità ai giorni nostri (in Italian). Angelo Colla Editore. ISBN 978-88-96817-06-3.
- Rossi, Girolamo (2014). Lo scudo crociato. Un simbolo medievale nella comunicazione politica del Novecento (in Italian). Armando Editore. ISBN 978-88-96817-06-3.
