= Five Star Bank (California) =

Community bank in California, U.S.

- Type: Public company
- Traded as: Nasdaq: FSBC
- Industry: Financial services
- Founded: 1999; 27 years ago
- Headquarters: Roseville, California, United States
- Number of locations: 10 banking offices
- Key people: James Beckwith, President & CEO
- Products: Business and commercial banking services
- Total assets: $5.6 billion (2026)
- Owner: Five Star Bancorp
- Website: fivestarbank.com

Five Star Bank is an American community business bank based in Roseville, California. The bank provides banking services and loans to the local business community in the areas that it operates.

Five Star Bank has ten banking offices locations throughout California, including four in the Capital Region (located in Roseville, Elk Grove, Rancho Cordova, and Sacramento/Natomas), three in the North State (located in Yuba City, Chico, and Redding), two in the San Francisco Bay Area (located in San Francisco and Walnut Creek), and one in the Central Valley (located in Lodi). In 2018, Five Star Bank moved its headquarters to its current Roseville location.

== History ==
Five Star Bank was founded in 1999 in Rocklin, California by real estate developers Buzz Oates and Frank Ramos. The bank was originally created after the two recognized a need for relationship-based commercial real estate banking services in the region around the state capital. Five Star Bank became a public company in May 2021 and is traded on the Nasdaq under FSBC.

The bank serves the following markets:

- Manufactured Housing, RV & Storage
- SBA
- Commercial Real Estate
- Construction
- Food, Agribusiness & Diversified Industries
- Faith Community
- Government
- Healthcare
- Manufacturing & Distribution
- Non-profit
- Professional Services & Practice
- Venture Banking, Technology & Startup
