= Constitution of the Cisalpine Republic (1801) =

The Constitution of the Cisalpine Republic (Italian: Costituzione della Repubblica Cisalpina), was the third and final constitution of the Cisalpine Republic, before being replaced by the Italian Constitution of 1802. It came into effect on 7 October 1801, replacing the former constitution of 1798.

== See also ==
- Statuto Albertino
- Constitution of Italy
- Constitutional Statute of Italy
