= Constitution of 1802 =

Constitution of 1802 may refer to:

- Constitution of the Year X, 1802 French Constitution
- Constitution of Italy (1802)
- Ohio Constitutional Convention (1802)
