= Constitutional Statute of Italy =

Statute of the Kingdom of Italy

The Constitutional Statute of Italy (Italian: Statuto costituzionale) was the statute of the Kingdom of Italy, a client state of France the under Napoleon I. It was roughly what is now the northern regions of Friuli-Venezia Giulia, Lombardy, Trentino-Alto Adige and Veneto. The statute came into effect on 19 March 1805.

== See also ==
- Statuto Albertino
- Constitution of Italy
- Constitution of Italy (1802)
