= Constitution of Italy =

Supreme law in Italy

Constitution of the Italian Republic
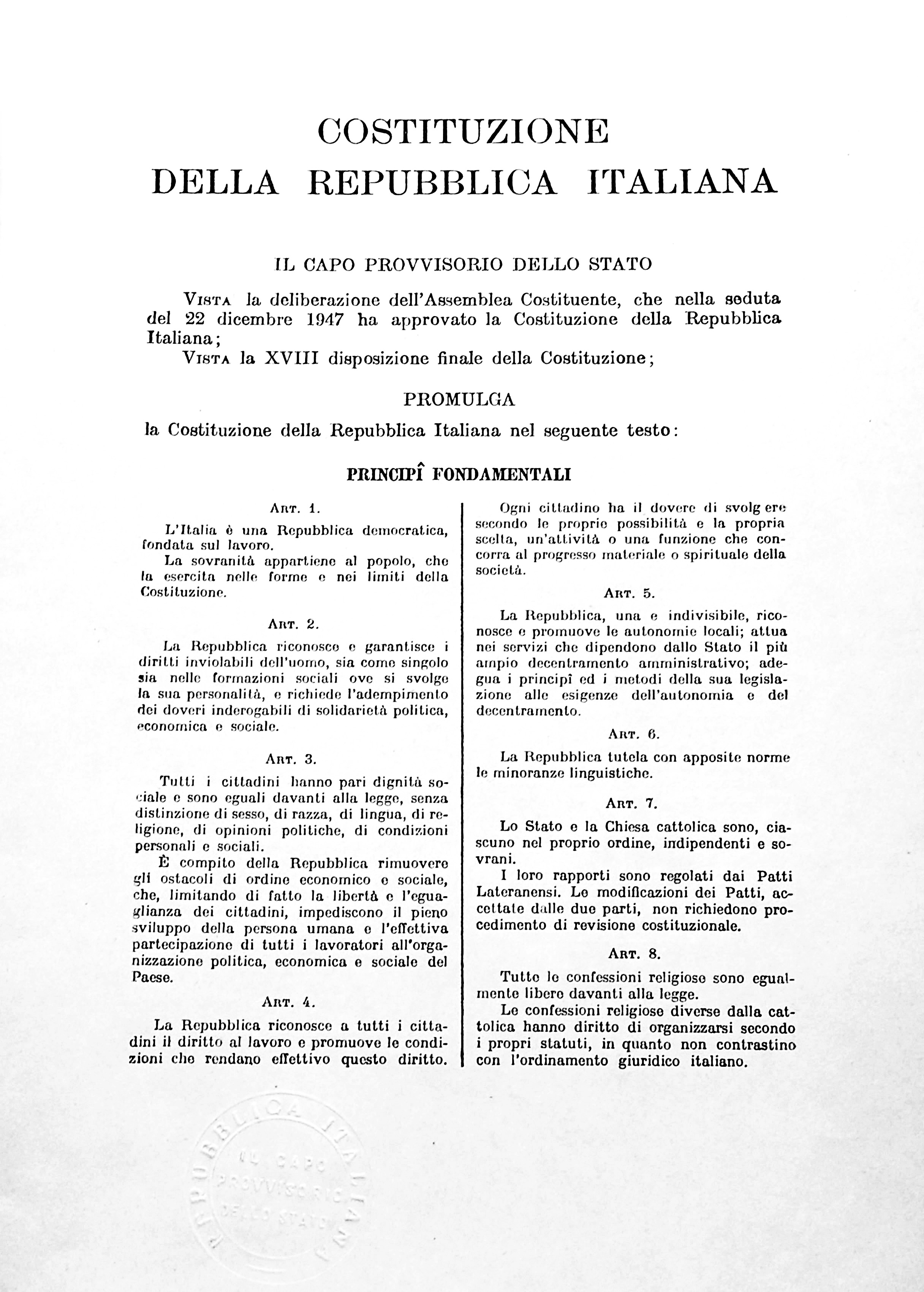
- One of three original copies of the Italian Constitution, now in the custody of Historical Archives of the President of the Republic

Overview
- Original title: Costituzione della Repubblica Italiana
- Jurisdiction: Italy
- Ratified: 22 December 1947
- Date effective: 1 January 1948; 78 years ago
- System: Unitary parliamentary constitutional republic

Government structure
- Branches: Three: Legislative, Executive, Judicial (Note: The President of the Republic is part of neither.)
- Head of state: President of the Republic, elected by an electoral college
- Chambers: Two: Chamber of Deputies and Senate of the Republic
- Executive: Council of Ministers, headed by a President of the Council
- Judiciary: Constitutional Court, Supreme Court of Cassation, Court of Audit and Council of State
- Federalism: No, but constituent entities enjoy self-government
- Electoral college: Yes: consists of Parliament and three delegates of Regional Councils (Note: Each of the 20 Regional Councils elects three delegates, except for the Aosta Valley which elects one.)
- Entrenchments: 1

History
- Amendments: 16
- Last amended: 2022

Full text
- Constitution of Italy at Wikisource

The Constitution of the Italian Republic (Italian: Costituzione della Repubblica Italiana) was ratified on 22 December 1947 by the Constituent Assembly, with 453 votes in favour and 62 against, before coming into force on 1 January 1948, one century after the previous Constitution of the Kingdom of Italy had been enacted. The text, which has since been amended sixteen times, was promulgated in an extraordinary edition of Gazzetta Ufficiale on 27 December 1947.

The Constituent Assembly was elected by universal suffrage on 2 June 1946, on the same day as the referendum on the abolition of the monarchy was held, and it was formed by the representatives of all the anti-fascist forces that contributed to the defeat of Nazi and Fascist forces during the liberation of Italy. The election was held in all Italian provinces, except the provinces of Bolzano, Gorizia, Trieste, Pola, Fiume and Zara, located in territories not administered by the Italian government but by the Allied authorities. These territories were still under occupation as the status of the territories was being resolved through the Paris Peace Treaties of 1947. By 1947, most of these territories had been annexed by Yugoslavia, including most of the Julian March and the Dalmatian city of Zara.

== Constituent Assembly ==
Piero Calamandrei, a professor of law, an authority on civil procedure, spoke in 1955 about World War II and the formation of the Italian constitution:

The groups of the Constituent Assembly: DC (207), PSI (115), PCI (104), UDN (41), FUQ (30), PRI (23), BNL (16), PdA (9), MIS (4) and others (7)

If you want to go on a pilgrimage to the place where our constitution was created, go to the mountains where partisans fell, to the prisons where they were incarcerated and to the fields where they were hanged. Wherever an Italian died to redeem freedom and dignity, go there, young people, and ponder: because that was where our constitution was born.

The groups that composed the Constituent Assembly covered a wide range of the political spectrum, with the prevalence of three major groups, namely Christian democratics, liberals and leftists. All these groups were deeply anti-fascist, so there was general agreement against an authoritarian constitution, putting more emphasis on the legislative power and making the executive power dependent on it.

All the different political and social views of the Assembly contributed in shaping and influencing the final text of the Constitution. For example, constitutional protections concerning marriage and the family reflect natural law themes as viewed by Roman Catholics, while those concerning workers' rights reflect socialist and communist views. This has been repeatedly described as the constitutional compromise, and all the parties that shaped the Constitution were referred to as the arco costituzionale (literally, "Constitutional Arch").

There were 556 members of the Constituent Assembly, of which 21 were women, with 9 from the Christian Democratic group, 9 from the Communist group, 2 from the Socialist group, and 1 from the Common Man's group. These members came from all walks of life, including politicians, philosophers and partisans; and many of them went on to become important figures in the Italian political history. (Note: See Notable Members of the Constituent Assembly for a list.)

== Provisions ==
The Constitution is composed of 139 articles (five of which were later abrogated) and arranged into three main parts: Principi Fondamentali, the Fundamental Principles (articles 1–12); Part I concerning the Diritti e Doveri dei Cittadini, or Rights and Duties of Citizens (articles 13–54); and Part II the Ordinamento della Repubblica, or Organisation of the Republic (articles 55–139); followed by 18 Disposizioni transitorie e finali, the Transitory and Final Provisions.

The Constitution primarily contains general principles; it is not possible to apply them directly. As with many written constitutions, only few articles are considered to be self-executing. The majority require enabling legislation, referred to as accomplishment of constitution. This process has taken decades and some contend that, due to various political considerations, it is still not complete.

=== Preamble ===
The preamble to the Constitution consists of the enacting formula:

| Italian | English |
|---|---|
| Il capo provvisorio dello Stato, vista la deliberazione dell'Assemblea Costituente, che nella seduta del 22 dicembre 1947 ha approvato la Costituzione della Repubblica Italaina; vista la XVIII disposizione finale della Costituzione; promulga la Costituzione della Repubblica Italiana nel seguente testo: | The provisional Head of State, by virtue of the deliberations of the Constituent Assembly, which in the session of 22 December 1947 approved the Constitution of the Italian Republic; by virtue of Final Provision XVIII of the Constitution; promulgates the Constitution of the Italian Republic in the following text: |

=== Fundamental Principles (Articles 1–12) ===
The Fundamental Principles declare the foundations on which the Republic is established, starting with its democratic nature, in which the sovereignty belongs to the people and is exercised by the people in the forms and within the limits of the Constitution. The Principles recognise the dignity of the person, both as an individual and in social groups, expressing the notions of solidarity and equality without distinction of sex, race, language, religion, political opinion, personal and social conditions. For this purpose, the right to work is also recognized, with labour considered the foundation of the Republic and a mean to achieve individual and social development: every citizen has a duty to contribute to the development of the society, as much as they can, and the Government must ensure the freedom and equality of every citizen.

While the Principles recognise the territorial integrity of the Republic, they also recognise and promote local autonomies and safeguard linguistic minorities. They also promote scientific, technical, and cultural development, and safeguard the environmental, historical, and artistic heritage of the nation, with a particular mention of the protection of the environment, the biodiversity, and the ecosystems in the interest of future generations.

The State and the Catholic Church are recognised as independent and sovereign, each within its own sphere. Freedom of religion is also recognised, with all religions having the right of self-organisation, as long as they do not conflict with the law, and the possibility to establish a relation with the State through agreements. In particular, Article 7 recognises the Lateran Treaty of 1929, which gave a special status to the Catholic Church, and allows modification to such treaty without the need of constitutional amendments. In fact, the treaty was later modified by a new agreement between church and state in 1984.

The Principles mention the international law and the rights of the foreigner, in particular the right of asylum for people who are denied in their home country the freedoms guaranteed by the Italian Constitution, or who are accused of political offences. They also repudiate war of aggression and promote and encourage international organisations aimed to achieve peace and justice among nations, even agreeing to limit sovereignty, on condition of equality with other countries, if necessary to achieve these goals.

The last of the Principles establishes the Italian tricolour as the flag of Italy: green, white and red, in three vertical bands of equal dimensions.

=== Rights and Duties of Citizens (Articles 13–54) ===
==== Civil Relations (Articles 13–28) ====
The flag of Italy, one of the national symbols of Italy

Articles 13–28 are the Italian equivalent of a bill of rights in common law jurisdictions. The Constitution recognises habeas corpus and the presumption of innocence; violations of personal liberties, properties and privacy are forbidden without an order of the Judiciary stating a reason, and outside the limits imposed by the law.

Every citizen is free to travel, both outside and inside the territory of the Republic, with restrictions granted by law only for possible health and security reasons. Citizens have the right to freely assemble, both in private and public places, peacefully and unarmed. Notifications to the authorities is required only for large meetings on public lands, which might be prohibited only for proven reason of security or public safety. The Constitution recognises the freedom of association, within the limits of criminal law. Secret associations and organisations having military character are forbidden.

Freedom of expression, press and religion are guaranteed in public places, except for those acts which are considered offensive by public morality. For example, hate speech, calumny and obscenity in the public sphere are considered criminal offences by the Italian Criminal Code.

Every citizen is protected from political persecution and cannot be subjected to personal or financial burden outside of the law. The right to a fair trial is guaranteed, with everyone having the right to protect their rights regardless of their economic status. Conditions and forms of reparation in case of judicial errors are defined by the law, and retroactive laws are not recognized, therefore nobody can be convicted for an action which was not illegal at the time in which it took place.

Criminal responsibility is considered personal, therefore collective punishments are not recognized. A defendant is considered innocent until proven guilty, and punishments are aimed at the rehabilitation of the convicted. The death penalty and cruel and unusual punishments are prohibited. Extradition of citizens is not permitted outside of those cases provided by international conventions, and is prohibited for political offences.

Public officials and public agencies are directly responsible under criminal, civil, and administrative law for acts committed in violation of rights. Civil liabilities are also extended to the Government and to the public agencies involved.

==== Ethical and Social Relations (Articles 29–34) ====
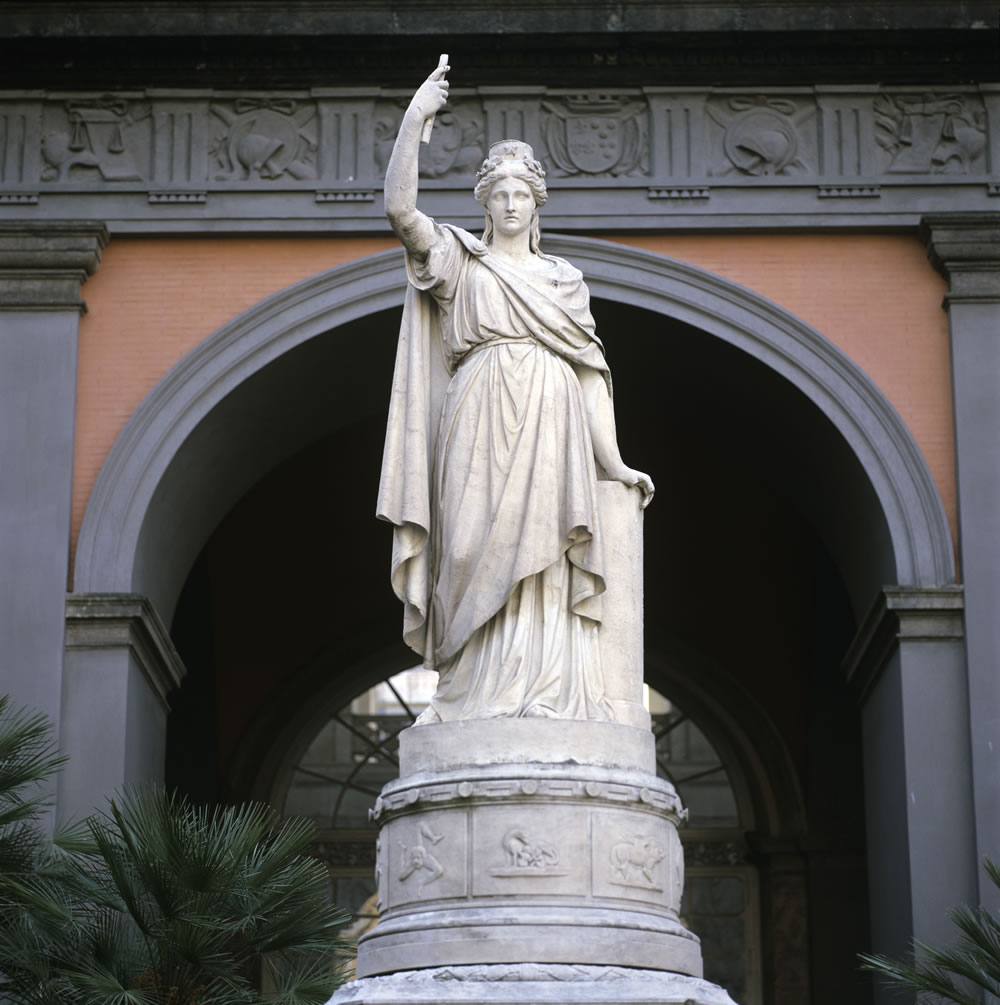
Statue of Italia turrita, the national personification of Italy

The Constitution recognises the family as a natural society founded on marriage, while marriage is simply regarded as a condition of moral and legal equality between the spouses. The law is supposed to guarantee the unity of the family, through economic measures and other benefits, and the parents have the right and duty to raise and educate their children, even if born out of wedlock. The fulfilment of such duties is provided by the law in the case of incapacity of the parents.

Health is recognised in Article 32 both as a fundamental right of the individual and as a collective interest, and free medical care is guaranteed to the indigent, and paid for by the taxpayers. Nobody can be forced to undergo any health treatment, except under the provisions of the law; the law is aimed at the respect of the human dignity.

Freedom of education is guaranteed, mentioning in particular the free teaching of the arts and sciences. General rules of education are established by law, which also establishes public schools of all branches and grades. The Constitution prescribes examinations for admission to and graduation from the various branches and grades and for qualification to exercise a profession. Private schools are required to meet the same standards of education and qualifications, while universities and academies can establish their own regulations within the limits of the law. Education is also a right, with a compulsory and free primary education, given for at least eight years. The highest levels of education are a right also for capable and deserving pupils, regardless of their financial status. To this end scholarships, allowances to families and other benefits can be assigned by the Republic through competitive examinations.

==== Economic Relations (Articles 35–47) ====
The Emblem of Italy, with at the center the Stella d'Italia

According to the Constitution, the Republic protects labour in all its forms and practices, providing for training and professional advancement of workers, promoting and encouraging international agreements and organisations that protect labour rights. It also gives the freedom to emigrate and protects Italian workers abroad.

Unfree labour is outlawed, with workers having the right to a salary commensurate with the quantity and quality of their work and a minimum wage guaranteed in order to ensure them and their families a free and dignified existence. The law establishes maximum daily working hours and the right to a weekly rest day and paid annual holidays cannot be waived. Equal rights and equal pay for women are recognised; working conditions must allow women to fulfil their role in the family and must ensure the protection of mother and child. A minimum age for paid labour is established by law, with special provisions protecting the work of minors. Welfare support is available to every citizen unable to work, disabled or lacking the necessary means of subsistence. Workers are entitled to adequate help in the case of accident, sickness, disability, old age and involuntary unemployment. Private-sector assistance may be freely provided.

Trade unions may be freely established without obligations, except for registration at local or central offices and requirements such as internal democratic structures. Registered trade unions have legal personality and may, through a unified representation that is proportional to their membership, enter into collective labour agreements that have a mandatory effect on all persons belonging to the categories referred to in the agreement. The right to strike is recognised within the limits of the law.

The Constitution recognises free enterprise, on condition it does not damage the common good, safety, liberty, human dignity, health, or the environment. The Republic is supposed to establish appropriate regulations on both public and private-sector economic activities, in order to orient them toward social and environmental purposes. Public and private properties are recognised, guaranteed and regulated by the law, with particular mention of the regulation of inheritance and the possibility of expropriation with obligation of compensation in the public interest. Also, to ensure the rational use of land and equitable social relationships, there could be constraints on the private ownership and size of land. The Republic protects, promotes and regulates small and medium-sized businesses, cooperatives and handicrafts and recognises the right of workers to collaborate in the management of enterprises, within the limits of the law. Private savings and credit operations are encouraged, protected and overseen.

==== Political Relations (Articles 48–54) ====
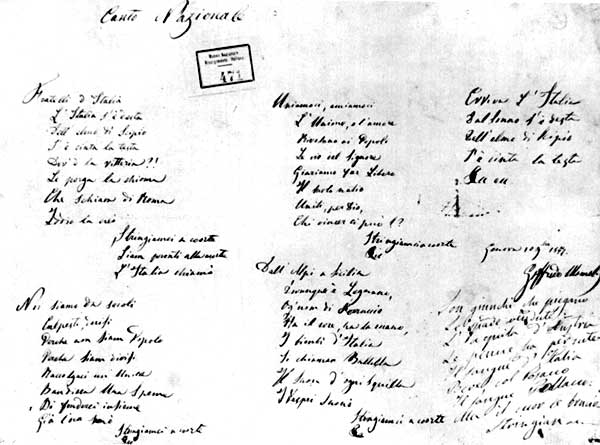
Holographic copy of 1847 of "Il Canto degli Italiani", the national anthem of Italy

Article 48 of the Constitution recognises the right to vote of every citizen, male or female, at home or abroad, who has attained majority, that is eighteen years of age. Voting is also considered a civic duty and the law must guarantee that every citizen is able to fulfill this right, establishing among other things, in 2000, overseas constituencies represented in the Parliament. The right to vote cannot be restricted except for civil incapacity, irrevocable penal sentences or in cases of moral unworthiness as laid down by the law.

Political parties may be freely established and petitions to Parliament by private citizens are recognised in order to promote the democratic process and express the needs of the people. Any citizen, male or female, at home or abroad, is eligible for public office on the conditions established by law. To this end, the Republic adopts specific measures to promote equal opportunities between men and women, and for Italians not resident in the territory of the Republic. Every elected official is entitled to the time needed to perform that function and to retain a previously held job.

Article 52 states that the defence of the homeland is mandatory and the "sacred duty for every citizen". It also stipulates that national service is performed within the limits and in the manner set by law. Since 2003, Italy has no more conscription, even though it can be reinstated if required. The fulfilment of which cannot prejudice a citizen's employment, nor the exercise of political rights. Particular mention is given to the democratic spirit of the Republic as the basis for the regulation of the armed forces.

The Constitution establishes a progressive form of taxation, which requires every citizen to contribute to public expenditure in accordance with their capability. Also, Article 54 states that every citizen has the duty to be loyal to the Republic and to uphold its Constitution and laws. Elected officials have the duty to fulfil their functions with discipline and honour, taking an oath to that effect in those cases established by law.

=== Organisation of the Republic (Articles 55–139) ===
Power is divided among the executive, the legislative and judicial branches; the Constitution establishes the balancing and interaction of these branches, rather than their rigid separation.

==== Parliament (Articles 55–82) ====
===== The Houses (Articles 55–69) =====
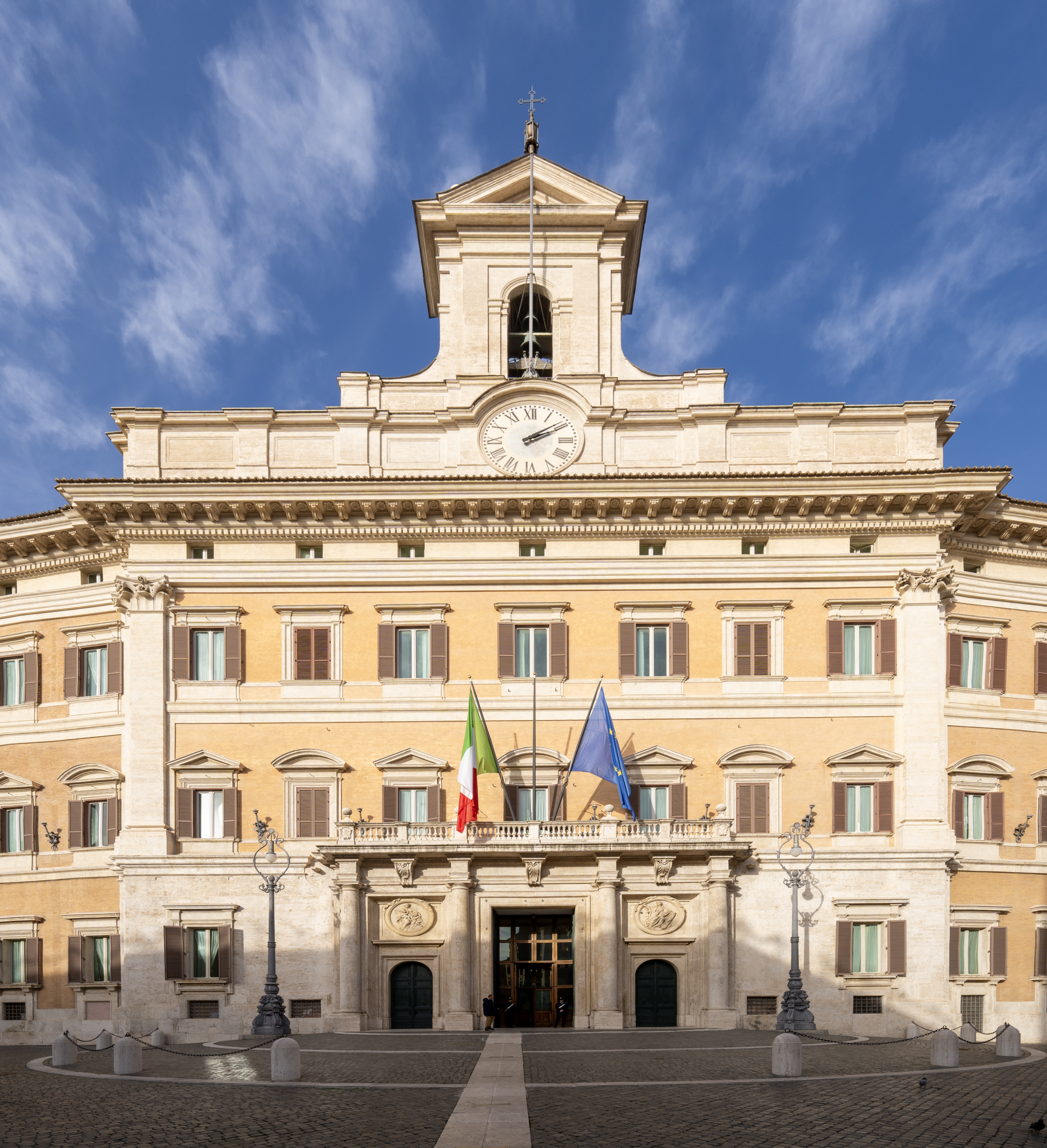
Palazzo Montecitorio, seat of the Chamber of Deputies

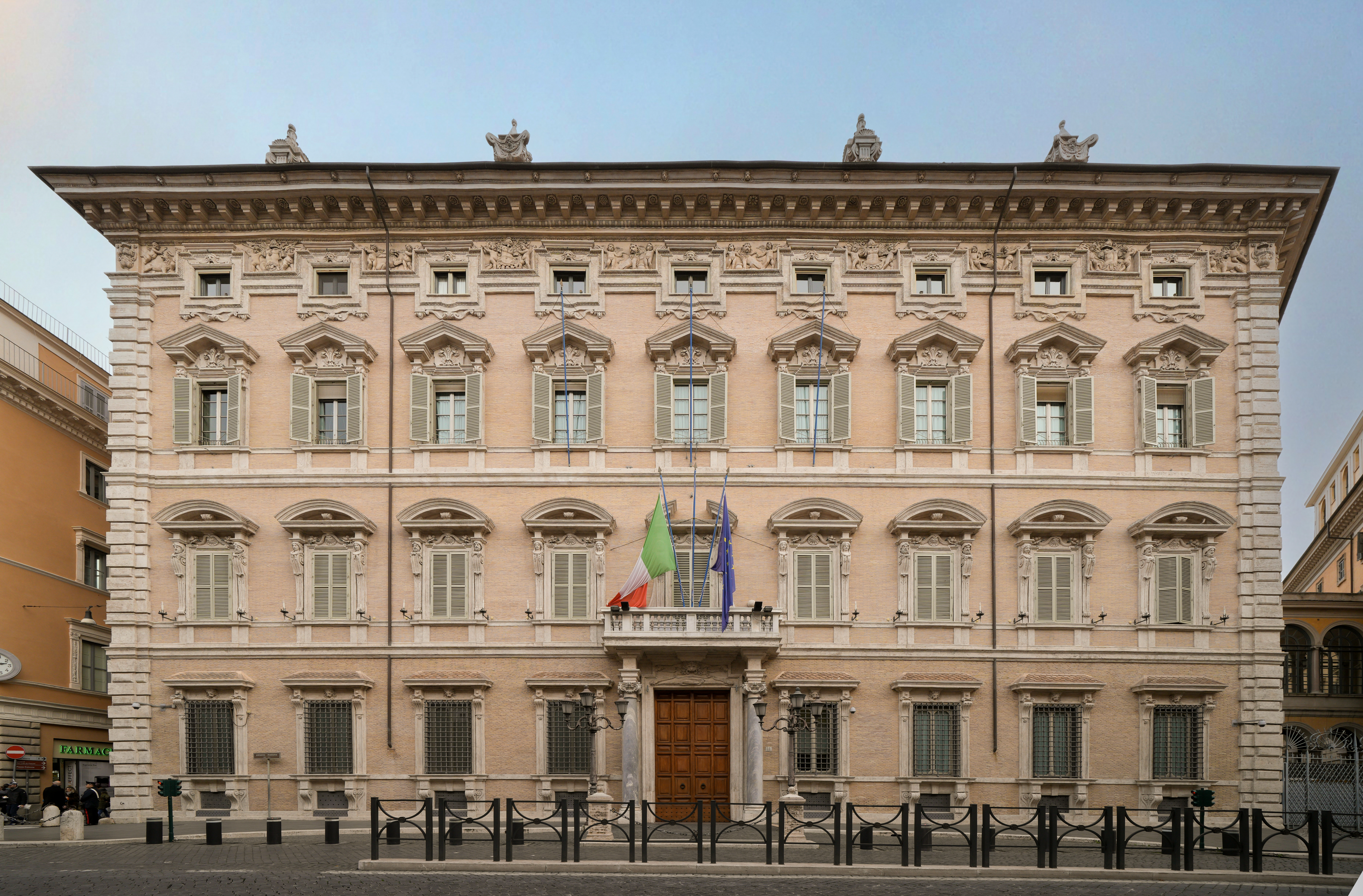
Palazzo Madama, seat of the Senate of the Republic

Article 55 establishes the Parliament as a bicameral entity, consisting of the Chamber of Deputies and the Senate of the Republic, which are elected every five years with no extension, except by law and only in the case of war, and which meet in joint session only in cases established by the Constitution.

The Chamber of deputies is elected by direct and universal suffrage. There are 400 deputies, eight of which are elected in the overseas constituencies, while the number of seats among the other electoral districts is obtained by dividing the number of citizens residing in the territory of the Republic by 392 and by distributing the seats proportionally to the population in every electoral district, on the basis of whole shares and highest remainders. All voters over the age of twenty-five are eligible to be deputies.

The Senate of the Republic is elected by direct and universal suffrage. There are 200 senators, four of whom are elected in the overseas constituencies, while the others are elected on a regional basis in proportion to the population of each Region similarly to the method used for the Chamber of deputies, with no Region having fewer than three senators, except for Molise having two, and Valle d'Aosta having one. There are also a small number of senators for life, such as former Presidents, by right unless they resign, and citizens appointed by the President of the Republic, in number up to five, for having brought honour to the nation with their achievements in the social, scientific, artistic and literary fields. All voters over the age of forty are eligible to be senators.

Disqualifications for the office of deputy or senator are determined by law and verified for members by each House even after the election; and nobody can be a member of both Houses at the same time. New elections must take place within seventy days from the end of the term of the old Parliament. The first meeting is convened no later than twenty days after the elections, and until such time the powers of the previous Houses are extended.

In default of any other provisions, Parliament has to be convened on the first working day of February and October. Special sessions for one of the Houses may be convened by its President, the President of the Republic or a third of its members; and in such cases the other House is convened as a matter of course. The President and Bureau of each House is elected among its member and during joint sessions the President and Bureau are those of the Chamber of Deputies. Each House adopts its rules by an absolute majority and, unless otherwise decided, the sittings are public. Members of the Government have the right and, if demanded, the obligation to attend, and shall be heard when they so request. The quorum for decisions in each House and in a joint session is a majority of the members, and the Constitution prescribes the majority required of those present for passing a decision.

Members of Parliament do not have a binding mandate, cannot be held accountable for the opinions expressed or votes cast while performing their functions, and cannot be submitted to personal or home search, arrested, detained or otherwise deprived of personal freedoms without the authorisation of their House, except when a final court sentence is enforced, or when the member is apprehended in flagrante delicto.

The salary of the members of Parliament is established by law.

===== Legislative Process (Articles 70–82) =====
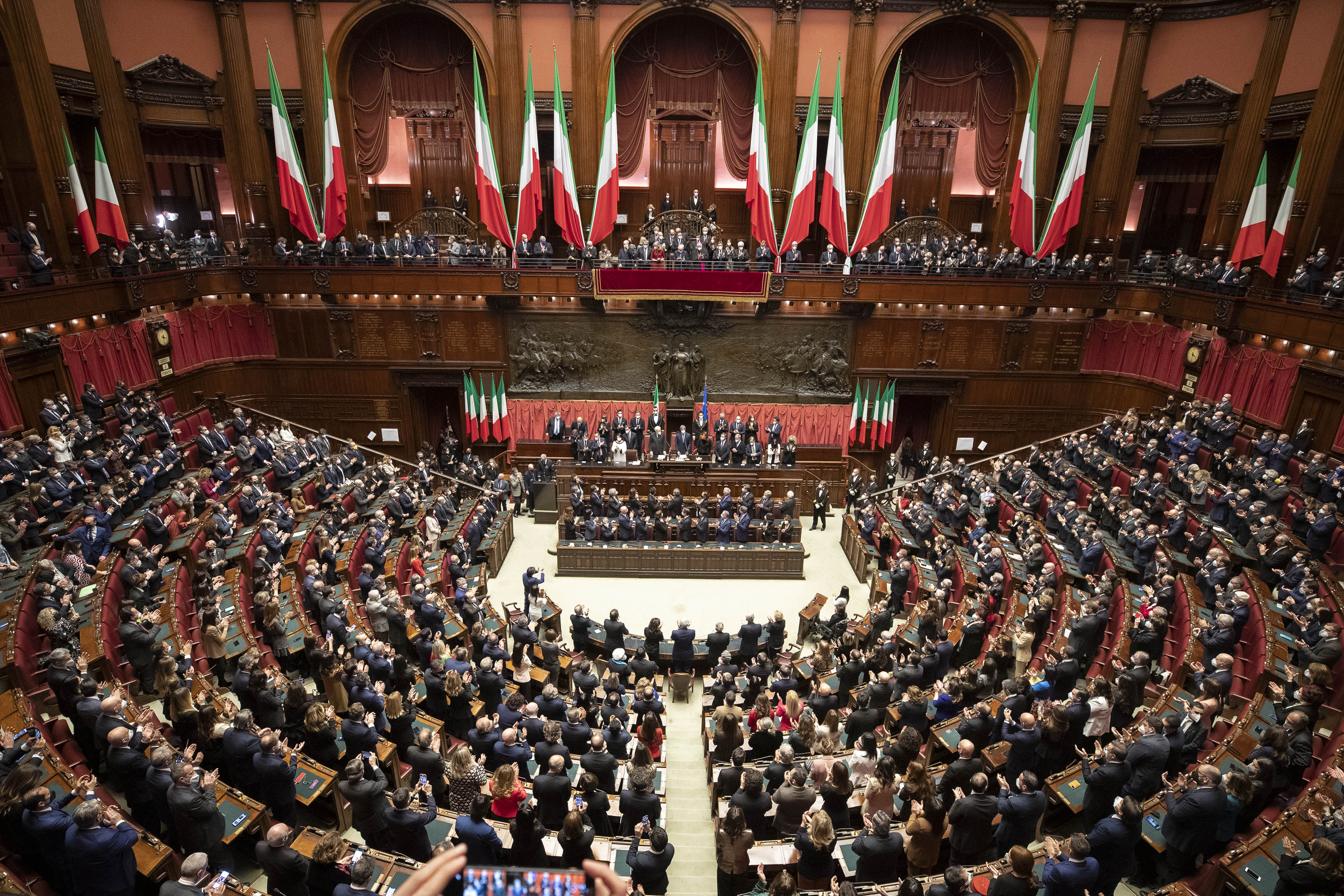
Swearing in of President Sergio Mattarella in front of a joint session of Parliament at Palazzo Montecitorio

Article 70 gives the legislative power to both Houses, and bills can be introduced by the Government, by a member of Parliament and by other entities as established by the Constitution. The citizens can also propose bills drawn up in articles and signed by at least fifty-thousand voters. Each House shall establish rules for reviewing a bill, starting with the scrutiny by a Committee and then the consideration section by section by the whole House, which will then put it to a final vote. The ordinary procedure for consideration and direct approval by each House must be followed for bills regarding constitutional and electoral matters, delegating legislation, ratification of international treaties and the approval of budgets and accounts. The rules shall also establish the ways in which the proceedings of Committees are made public.

After the approval by the Parliament, laws are promulgated by the President of the Republic within one month or a deadline established by an absolute majority of the Parliament for laws declared urgent. A law is published immediately after promulgation and comes into force on the fifteenth day after publication, unless otherwise established. The President can veto a bill and send it back to Parliament stating a reasoned opinion. If such law is passed again, the veto is overruled and the President must sign it.

The Constitution recognises general referendums for repealing a law or part of it, when they are requested by five hundred thousand voters or five Regional Councils; while referendums on a law regulating taxes, the budget, amnesty or pardon, or a law ratifying an international treaty are not recognised. Any citizen entitled to vote for the Chamber of Deputies has the right to vote in a referendum, and if the majority of those eligible has voted and a majority of valid votes has been achieved, the referendum is considered carried.

The Government cannot have legislative functions, except for a limited times and for specific purposes established in cases of necessity and urgency, and cannot issue a decree having the force of a law without an enabling act from the Parliament. Temporary measures shall lose effect from the beginning if not transposed into law by the Parliament within sixty days of their publication. Parliament may regulate the legal relations arisen from the rejected measures.

The Constitution gives to the Parliament the authority to declare a state of war and to vest the necessary powers into the Government. The Parliament has also the authority to grant amnesties and pardons through a law having a two-thirds majority in both Houses, on each section and on the final vote, and having a deadline for implementation. Such amnesties and pardons cannot be granted for crimes committed after the introduction of such bill.

Parliament can authorise by law the ratification of such international treaties as have a political nature, require arbitration or a legal settlement, entail change of borders, spending or new legislation.

Budget and financial statements introduced by the Government must be passed by the Parliament every year, while provisional implementation of the budget may not be allowed except by law and for no longer than four months. The budget must balance revenue and expenditure, taking account of the adverse and favourable phases of the economic cycle, which can be the only justification for borrowing. New or increased expenditure must be introduced by laws providing for the resources to cover it.

Both Houses can conduct enquiries on matters of public interest, through a Committee of its Members representing the proportionality of existing parties. A Committee of Enquiry may conduct investigations and examination with the same powers and limitations as the judiciary.

==== The President of the Republic (Articles 83–91) ====
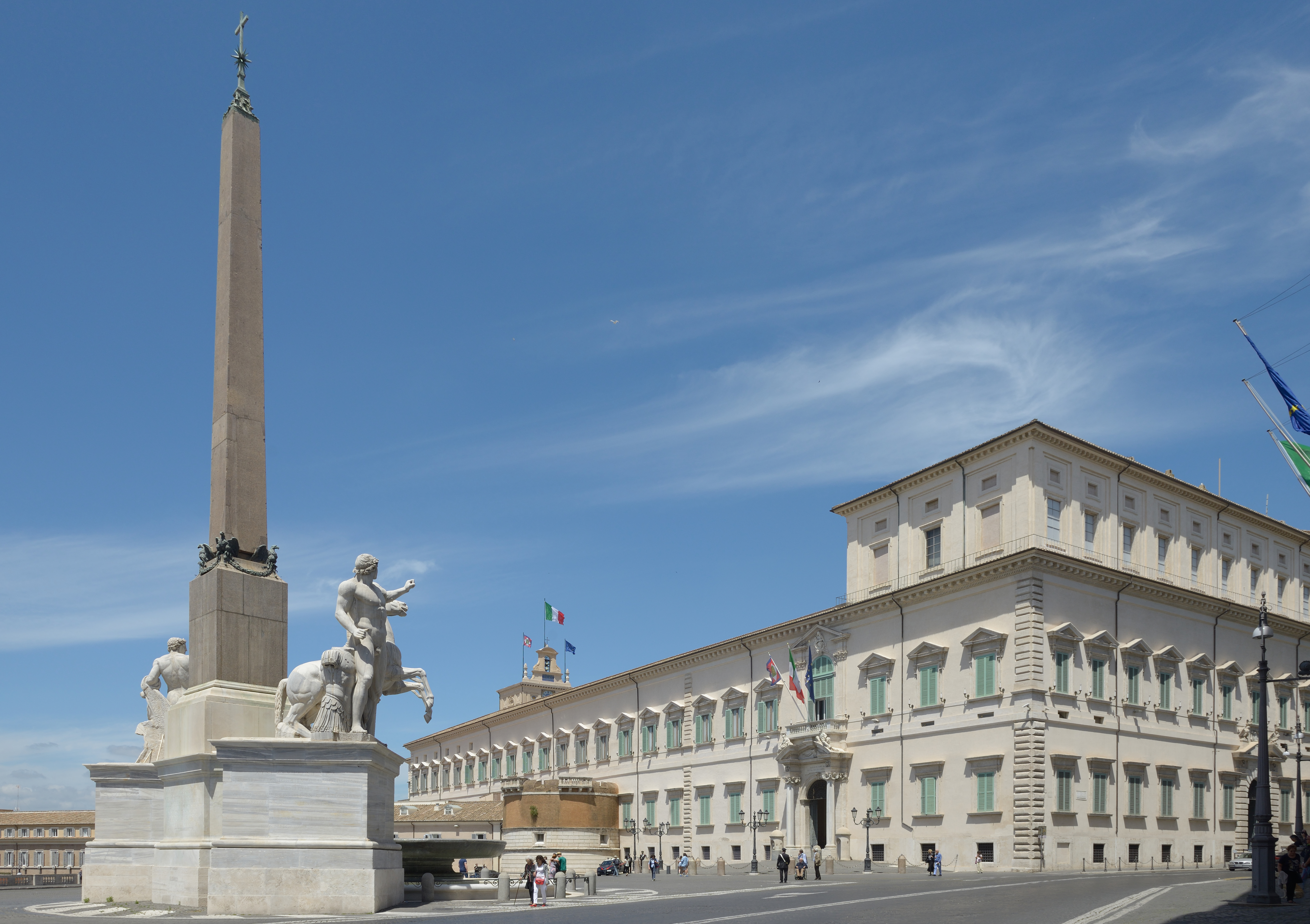
Quirinal Palace, official residence of the President of the Republic

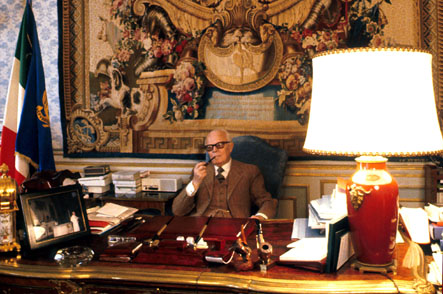
President Sandro Pertini in his office at the Quirinal Palace

The President of the Republic is elected for seven years by the Parliament in joint session, together with three delegates from each Region, except for Valle d'Aosta having one, elected by the Regional Councils in order to ensure the representation of minorities. The election is by secret ballot initially with a majority of two-thirds of the assembly, while after the third ballot an absolute majority is sufficient. Thirty days before the end of the term of the current President of the Republic, the President of the Chamber of Deputies must summon a joint session of Parliament and the regional delegates to elect the new President of the Republic. During or in the three months preceding the dissolution of Parliament, the election must be held within the first fifteen days of the first sitting of a new Parliament. In the meantime, the powers of the incumbent President of the Republic are extended.

Any citizen over fifty enjoying civil and political rights can be elected president. Those citizens who already hold any other office are barred from becoming president, unless they resign their previous office once they are elected. The salary and privileges of the president are established by law.

In all the cases in which the president is unable to perform the functions of the Office, these shall be performed by the President of the Senate of the Republic. In the event of permanent incapacity, death or resignation of the President of the Republic, the President of the Chamber of Deputies must call an election of a new President of the Republic within fifteen days, notwithstanding the longer term envisaged during dissolution of the Parliament or in the three months preceding dissolution.

According to the Constitution, the primary role of the president, as head of the state, is to represent the national unity. Among the powers of the president are the capacity to

- send messages to Parliament, authorise the introduction of bills by the Government, and promulgate laws, decrees and regulations,
- dissolve one or both Houses of Parliament, in consultation with their presidents, except during the last six months of his term (known as the semestre bianco), unless that period coincides at least in part with the final six months of the Parliament,
- call a general referendum under certain circumstances established by the Constitution,
- appoint State officials in the cases established by law,
- accredit and receive diplomats, and ratify international treaties, after the Parliament's authorisation when required,
- make declarations of war agreed upon by the Parliament, as commander-in-chief of the armed forces,
- grant pardons, commute sentences, and confer honorary distinctions of the Republic.

The President also presides over the High Council of the Judiciary and the Supreme Council of Defence. A writ from the President cannot be valid unless signed by the proposing Minister, and in order to have force of law must be countersigned by the President of the Council of ministers.

The President is not responsible for the actions performed in the exercise of his duties, except for high treason and violation of the Constitution, for which the President can be impeached by the Parliament in joint session, with an absolute majority of its members.

Before taking office, the President must take an oath of allegiance to the Republic and pledge to uphold the Constitution before the Parliament in joint session.

==== The Government (Articles 92–100) ====
===== The Council of Ministers (Articles 92–96) =====
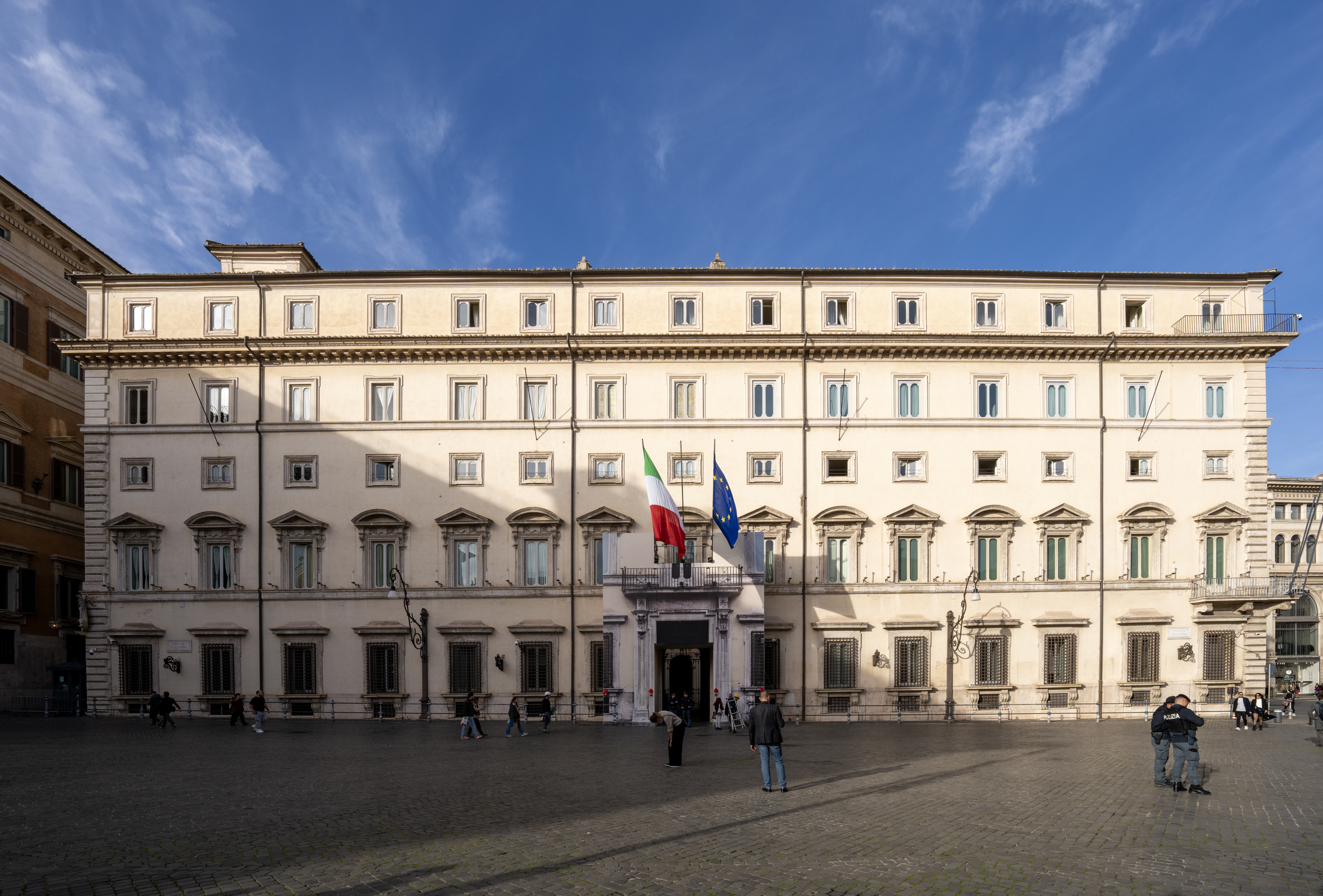
Palazzo Chigi, official residence of the President of the Council of Ministers

The Government of the Republic is composed of the President of the Council of ministers and the other Ministers. The President of the Republic appoints the President of the Council and, on his proposal, the Ministers that form its cabinet; swearing them all in before they can take office. All the appointees must receive, within ten days of the appointments, the confidence of both Houses for the formation of a Government, each House being able to grant or withdraw its confidence through a reasoned motion voted on by roll-call. If one or both Houses vote against a bill proposed by the Government, this does not entail the obligation to resign, however sometimes the President of the Council does attach a confidence vote to a proposal of importance according to the Government. If the majority coalition in one or both Houses does not support the Government anymore, a motion of no-confidence can be presented. It must be signed by at least one-tenth of the members of the House and cannot be debated earlier than three days from its presentation.

The primary function of the President of the council is to conduct the general policy of the Government, holding responsibility for it. The President of the Council ensures the coherence of political and administrative policies, by promoting and co-ordinating the activities of the Ministers. The Ministers are collectively responsible for the acts of the Council of Ministers. They are also individually responsible for the acts of their own ministries.

The organisation of the Presidency of the council, as well as the number, competence and organisation of the ministries is established by law. The Members of the Council of ministers, even if they resign from office, are subject to normal justice for crimes committed in the exercise of their duties, provided authorisation is given by the Senate of the Republic or the Chamber of Deputies, in accordance with the norms provided by the Constitutional law.

===== Public Administration (Articles 97–98) =====
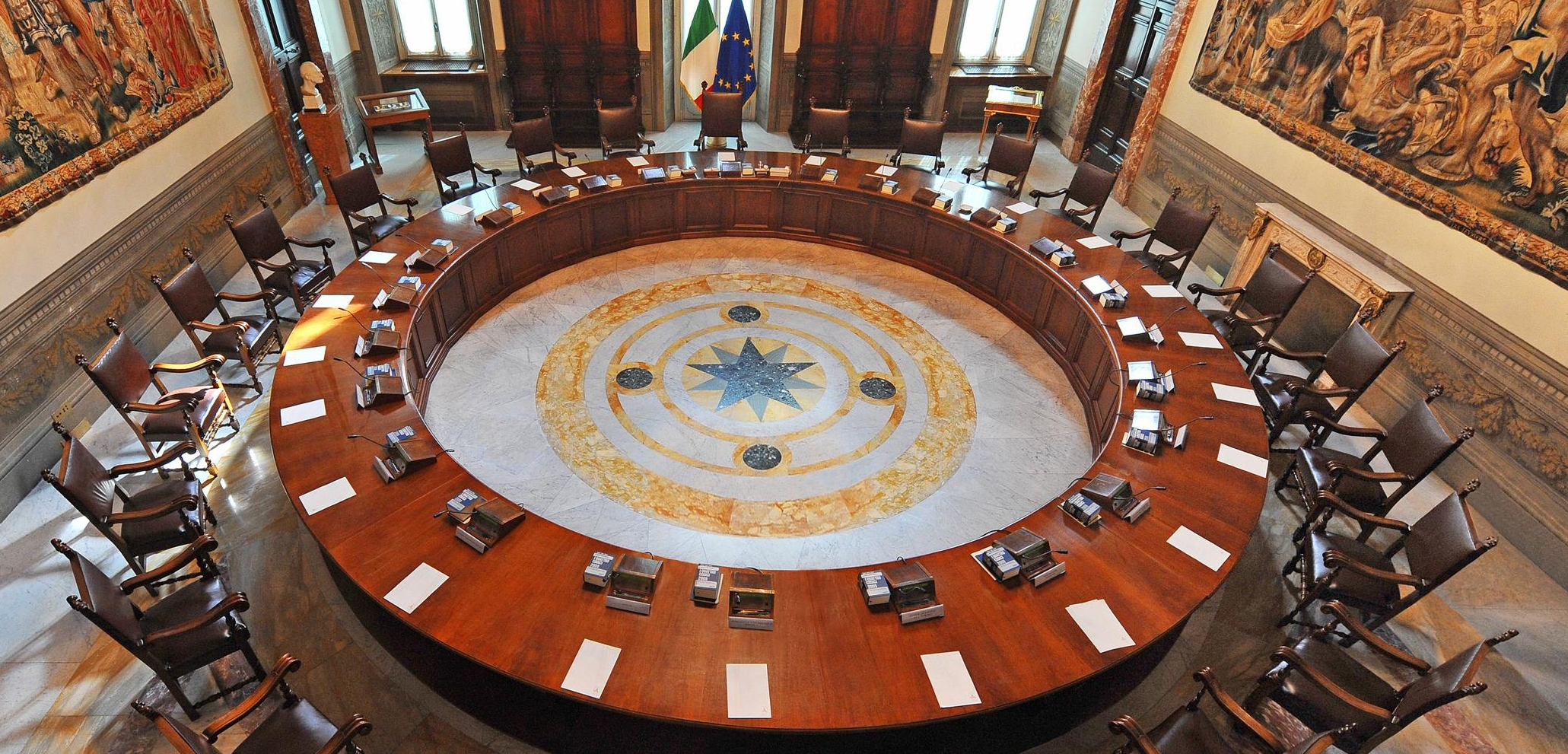
Hall of the Council of Ministers within Palazzo Chigi

General government entities must ensure a balanced budget and a sustainable public debt, in accordance with the European Union law. The organisation of public offices is established by the law, in order to ensure the efficiency and impartiality of administration. The regulations of the offices lay down the areas of competence, the duties and the responsibilities of the officials. Employment in public administration is accessed through competitive examinations, except in the cases established by law.

Civil servants are exclusively at the service of the nation. If they are Members of Parliament, they cannot be promoted in their services, except through seniority. Limitations are established by law on the right to become members of political parties in the case of magistrates, career military staff in active service, law enforcement officers, and overseas diplomatic and consular representatives.

===== Auxiliary Bodies (Articles 99–100) =====
The National Council for Economics and Labour (CNEL) is composed, as set out by law, of experts and representatives of the economic categories, in such a proportion as to take account of their numerical and qualitative importance. It serves as a consultative body for Parliament and the Government on those matters and those functions attributed to it by law. It can initiate legislation and may contribute to drafting economic and social legislation according to the principles and within the limitations laid out by law.

The Council of State is a legal-administrative consultative body and it oversees the administration of justice. The Court of Accounts exercises preventive control over the legitimacy of Government measures, and also ex-post auditing of the administration of the State budget. It participates, in the cases and ways established by law, in auditing the financial management of the entities receiving regular budgetary support from the State. It reports directly to Parliament on the results of audits performed. The law ensures the independence from the Government of the two bodies and of their members.

==== The Judicial Branch (Articles 101–113) ====
===== The Organisation of the Judiciary (Articles 101–110) =====
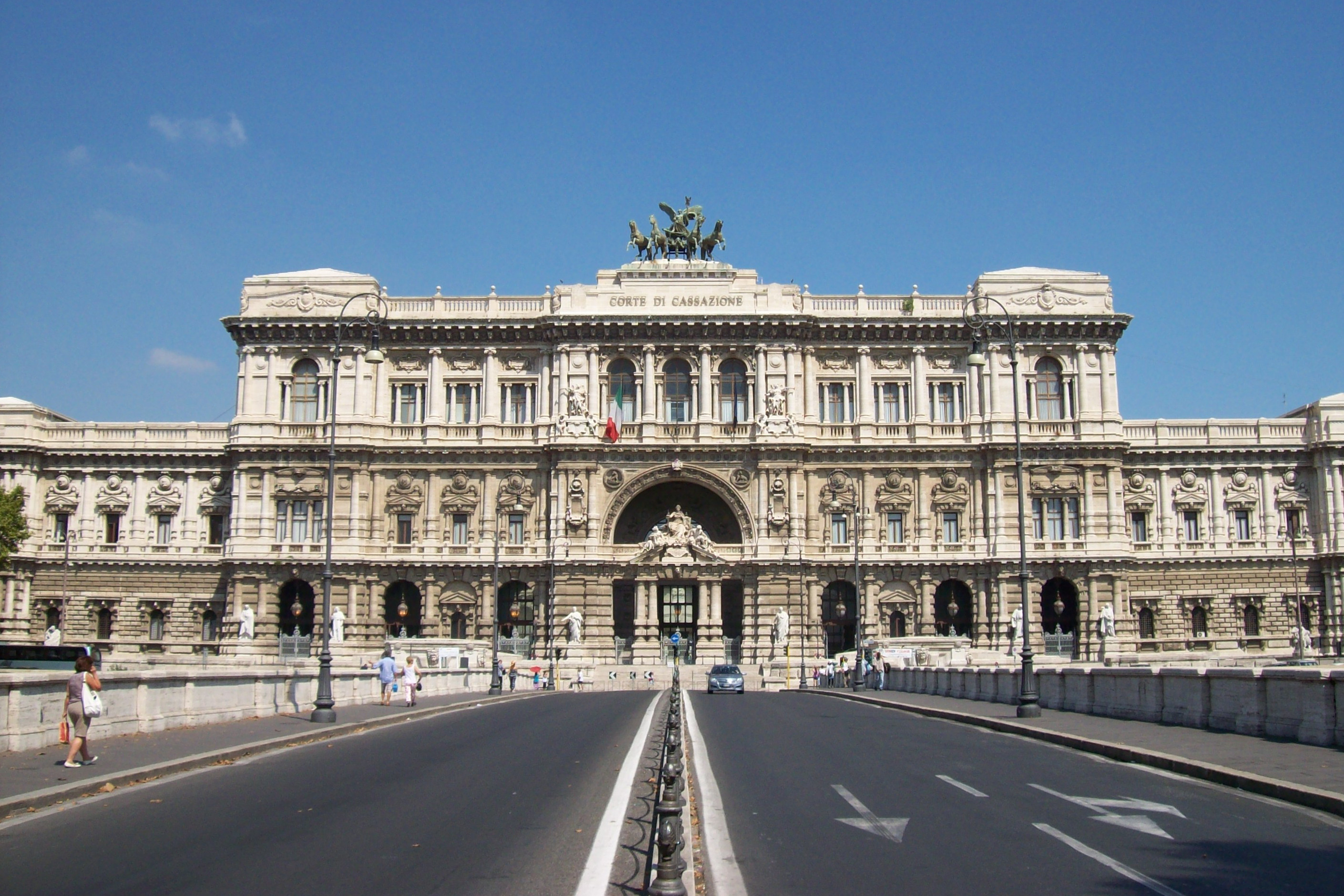
Palace of Justice, seat of the Supreme Court of Cassation

Article 101 states that justice is administered in the name of the people, and that judges are subject only to the law. The Constitution empowers the Judiciary to nominate and regulate magistrates exercising legal proceedings, establishing the Judiciary as autonomous and independent of all other powers. Special judges are prohibited, while only specialised sections for specific matters within the ordinary judicial bodies can be established, and must include the participation of qualified citizens who are not members of the Judiciary. The provisions concerning the organisation of the Judiciary and the judges are established by law, ensuring the independence of judges of special courts, of state prosecutors of those courts, and of other persons participating in the administration of justice. Direct participation of the people in the administration of justice is also regulated by law.

The Council of State and the other bodies of judicial administration have jurisdiction over the protection of legitimate rights before the public administration and, in particular matters laid out by law, also of subjective rights. The Court of Accounts has jurisdiction in matters of public accounts and in other matters laid out by law. The jurisdiction of military tribunals in times of war is established by law. In times of peace they have jurisdiction only for military crimes committed by members of the Armed Forces.

The High Council of the Judiciary is presided over by the President of the Republic, two-thirds of its members are elected by all the ordinary judges belonging to the various categories, and one third are elected by Parliament in joint session from among university professors of law and lawyers with fifteen years of practice. Its vice-president is elected by the council from among those members designated by Parliament. The members of the council are elected for four years and cannot be immediately re-elected. They also cannot be registered in professional rolls, nor serve in Parliament or on a Regional Council while in office.

The council has jurisdiction for employment, assignments and transfers, promotions and disciplinary measures of judges, following the regulations established by the Judiciary.

Judges are selected through competitive examinations, while honorary judges for all the functions performed by single judges can be appointed also by election. University professors of law and lawyers with fifteen years of practice and registered in the special professional rolls for the higher courts can be appointed for their outstanding merits as Cassation councillors, following recommendations by the council.

Judges cannot be removed, dismissed or suspended from office or assigned to other courts or functions unless by a decision of the council, following the rules established by the Judiciary or with the consent of the judges themselves. Judges are distinguished only by their different functions, and the state prosecutor enjoys the guarantees established by the Judiciary.

The legal authorities have direct use of the judicial police. The Minister of Justice is responsible for the organisation and functioning of those services involved with justice and has the power to originate disciplinary actions against judges, which are then administered by the High Council of the Judiciary.

===== Rules on Jurisdiction (Articles 111–113) =====
Jurisdiction is implemented through due process regulated by law. Adversary proceedings, equality before the law and the impartiality of the judge are recognised for all court trials, whose duration of trials is reasonably established by law. The right to a fair trial is recognized, with the defendant having the right to be promptly informed confidentially of the nature and reasons for the charges brought and the right to adequate time and conditions to prepare a defence. The rights to direct, cross and redirect examination are also recognised to both the defendant and the prosecutor. The defendant has also the right to produce all other evidence in favour of the defence, and to be assisted by an interpreter in the case that they do not speak or understand the language in which the court proceedings are conducted.

The formation of evidence is based on the principle of adversary hearings and the laws regulates the cases in which the formation of evidence does not occur in an adversary proceeding with the consent of the defendant or owing to reasons of ascertained objective impossibility or proven illicit conduct. Presumption of innocence is recognised and the guilt of the defendant cannot be established on the basis of statements by persons who by choice have always avoided cross-examination by the defendant or the defence counsel.

All judicial decisions must include a statement of reasons, and appeals to the Court of Cassation in cases of violations of the law are always allowed against sentences affecting personal freedoms pronounced by ordinary and special courts, except possibly in cases of sentences by military tribunals in time of war. Appeals to the Court of Cassation against decisions of the Council of State and the Court of Accounts are permitted only for reasons of jurisdiction.

The public prosecutor has the obligation to institute criminal proceedings. The judicial safeguarding of rights and legitimate interests before the bodies of ordinary or administrative justice is always permitted against acts of the public administration. Such judicial protection cannot be excluded or limited to particular kinds of appeal or for particular categories of acts. The law determines which judicial bodies are empowered to annul acts of public administration in the cases and with the consequences provided for by the law itself.

==== Regions, Provinces, Municipalities (Articles 114–133) ====
Administrative divisions of Italy: Regions (black borders); Provinces (dark gray borders); Comuni (light grey borders)

Metropolitan cities of Italy

According to Article 114 the Republic is composed of the Municipalities (comuni), the Provinces, the Metropolitan Cities, the Regions and the State. Municipalities, provinces, metropolitan cities and regions are recognised as autonomous entities having their own statutes, powers and functions in accordance with the principles of Constitution. Rome is the capital of the Republic, and its status is regulated by law.

The Constitution grants the Regions of Aosta Valley, Friuli-Venezia Giulia, Sardinia, Sicily, Trentino-Alto Adige/Südtirol an autonomous status, acknowledging their powers in relation to legislation, administration and finance, with a particular mention of the autonomous provinces of Trento and Bolzano (Bozen). The allocation of legislative powers between the State and the Regions is established in compliance with the Constitution and with the constraints deriving from international treaties, besides the already mentioned autonomous status granted to some Regions.

The Constitution gives the State exclusive legislative power in matters of

- foreign policy and international relations, in particular with the European Union, immigration, right of asylum, legal status of non EU citizens, citizenship, civil status and register offices;
- relations between the Republic and religious denominations;
- defence and armed forces, State security, armaments, ammunition and explosives;
- the currency, savings protection and financial markets, competition protection, foreign exchange system, state taxation and accounting systems, equalisation of financial resources and harmonisation of public accounts;
- state bodies and relevant electoral laws, state referendums; elections to the European Parliament, electoral legislation, governing bodies and fundamental functions of the Municipalities, Provinces and Metropolitan Cities;
- legal and administrative organisation of the State and of national public agencies, public order and security, with the exception of local administrative police;
- jurisdiction and procedural law; civil and criminal law; administrative judicial system;
- determination of the basic level of benefits relating to civil and social entitlements to be guaranteed throughout the national territory, general provisions on education, social security, customs, protection of national borders and international prophylaxis;
- weights and measures, standard time, statistical and computerised coordination of data of state, regional and local administrations, works of the intellect, protection of the environment, the ecosystem and cultural heritage.

Concurring legislation applies to the following subject matters: international and EU relations of the Regions; foreign trade; job protection and safety; education, subject to the autonomy of educational institutions and with the exception of vocational education and training; professions; scientific and technological research and innovation support for productive sectors; health protection; nutrition; sports; disaster relief; land-use planning; civil ports and airports; large transport and navigation networks; communications; national production, transport and distribution of energy; complementary and supplementary social security; co-ordination of public finance and taxation system; enhancement of cultural and environmental properties, including the promotion and organisation of cultural activities; savings banks, rural banks, regional credit institutions; regional land and agricultural credit institutions. In the subject matters covered by concurring legislation legislative powers are vested in the Regions, except for the determination of the fundamental principles, which are laid down in State legislation.

The Regions have legislative powers in all subject matters not expressly covered by State legislation. The Regions and the autonomous provinces of Trent and Bolzano take part in preparatory decision-making process of EU legislative acts in the areas that fall within their responsibilities, and are also responsible for the implementation of international agreements and European measures, in the limits established by the law.

Regulatory powers is vested in the State with respect to the subject matters of exclusive legislation, subject to any delegations of such powers to the Regions. Regulatory powers are vested in the Regions in all other subject matters. Municipalities, Provinces and Metropolitan Cities have regulatory powers for the organisation and implementation of the functions attributed to them. Regional laws must remove any obstacle to the full equality of men and women in social, cultural and economic life and promote equal access to elected offices for men and women. Agreements between Regions aiming at improving the performance of regional functions and possibly envisaging the establishment of joint bodies shall be ratified by regional law. In the areas falling within their responsibilities, Regions can enter into agreements with foreign States and local authorities of other States in the cases and according to the forms laid down by State legislation.

The administrative functions that are not attributed to the Provinces, Metropolitan Cities and Regions or to the State, are attributed to the Municipalities, following the principles of subsidiarity, differentiation and proportionality, to ensure their uniform implementation. Municipalities, Provinces and Metropolitan Cities also have administrative functions of their own, as well as the functions assigned to them by State or by regional legislation, according to their respective competences. State legislation provides for co-ordinated action between the State and the Regions in the subject of common competence. The State, Regions, Metropolitan Cities, Provinces and Municipalities also promote the autonomous initiatives of citizens, both as individuals and as members of associations, relating to activities of general interest, on the basis of the principle of subsidiarity.

The Constitution grants Municipalities, Provinces, Metropolitan Cities and Regions to have revenue and expenditure autonomy, although subjected to the obligation of a balanced budget and in compliance with the European Union law; as well as independent financial resources, setting and levying taxes and collect revenues of their own, in compliance with the Constitution and according to the principles of co-ordination of State finances and the tax system, and sharing in the tax revenues related to their respective territories. State legislation provides for an equalisation fund for the territories having lower per-capita taxable capacity. Revenues raised from the above-mentioned sources shall enable municipalities, provinces, metropolitan cities and regions to fully finance the public functions attributed to them. The State allocates supplementary resources and adopts special measures in favour of specific Municipalities, Provinces, Metropolitan Cities and Regions to promote economic development along with social cohesion and solidarity, to reduce economic and social imbalances, to foster the exercise of the rights of the person or to achieve goals other than those pursued in the ordinary implementation of their functions.

The Constitution grants Municipalities, Provinces, Metropolitan Cities and Regions to have their own properties, allocated to them pursuant to general principles laid down in State legislation. Indebtedness is allowed only as a means of funding investments, with the concomitant adoption of amortisation plans and on the condition of a balanced budget for all authorities of each region, taken as a whole. State guarantees on loans contracted for this purpose are prohibited. Import, export or transit taxes between Regions are not permitted and the freedom of movement of persons or goods between Regions is protected, as well as the right of citizens to work in any part whatsoever of the national territory. The Government can intervene for bodies of the Regions, Metropolitan Cities, Provinces and Municipalities if the latter fail to comply with international rules and treaties or EU legislation, or in the case of grave danger for public safety and security, or when necessary to preserve legal or economic unity and in particular to guarantee the basic level of benefits relating to civil and social entitlements, regardless of the geographic borders of local authorities. The law lays down the procedures to ensure that subsidiary powers are exercised in compliance with the principles of subsidiarity and loyal co-operation.

The Constitution establishes the bodies of each Region as the Regional Council, the Regional Executive and its president. The Regional Council exercises the legislative powers attributed to the Region as well as the other functions granted by the Constitution and the laws, among which also the possibility to submit bills to Parliament. The Regional Executive exercises the executive powers in the Region, and The President of the Executive represents the Region, directs the policy-making of the Executive and is responsible for it, promulgates laws and regional statutes, directs the administrative functions delegated to the Region by the State, in conformity with the instructions of the Government. The electoral system and limits to the eligibility and compatibility of the President, the other members of the Regional Executive and the Regional councillors is established by a regional law in accordance with the law of the Republic, which also establishes the term of elective offices. No one can belong at the same time to a Regional Council or to a Regional Executive and to either House of Parliament, another Regional Council, or the European Parliament. The Council elects a President and a Bureau from amongst its members. Regional councillors are not accountable for the opinions expressed and votes cast in the exercise of their functions. The President of the Regional Executive are elected by universal and direct suffrage, unless the regional statute provides otherwise. The elected president can appoint and dismiss the members of the Executive.

The Statute of each Region, in compliance with the Constitution, lays down the form of government and basic principles for the organisation of the Region and the conduct of its business. The statute also regulate the right to initiate legislation and promote referendums on the laws and administrative measures of the Region as well as the publication of laws and of regional regulations. Regional Council can adopt or amend with a law approved by an absolute majority of its members, with two subsequent deliberations at an interval of not less than two months, and not requiring the approval of the Government commissioner. The Government can challenge the constitutional legitimacy of the Regional Statutes to the Constitutional Court within thirty days of their publication. The statute can be submitted to popular referendum if one-fiftieth of the electors of the Region or one-fifth of the members of the Regional Council so request within three months from its publication. The statute that is submitted to referendum is not promulgated if it is not approved by the majority of valid votes. In each Region, statutes regulate the activity of the Council of local authorities as a consultative body on relations between the Regions and local authorities.

The Constitutions allows administrative tribunals of the first instance in the Region, in accordance with the law, with sections which can be established in places other than the regional capital.

The President of the Republic, as protector of the Constitution, can dissolve Regional Councils and remove the President of the Executive with a reasoned decree, in the case of acts in contrast with the Constitution or grave violations of the law, or also for reasons of national security. Such decree is adopted after consultation with a committee of Deputies and Senators for regional affairs which is set up in the manner established by the law. The President of the Executive can also be removed through a motion of no confidence by the Regional Council, that is undersigned by at least one-fifth of its members and adopted by roll call vote with an absolute majority of members. The motion cannot be debated before three days have elapsed since its introduction. The adoption of a no confidence motion against a President of the Executive elected by universal and direct suffrage, and the removal, permanent inability, death or voluntary resignation of the President of the Executive entail the resignation of the Executive and the dissolution of the council. The same effects are produced by the simultaneous resignation of the majority of the Council members.

The Government can challenge the constitutional legitimacy of a regional law before the Constitutional Court within sixty days from its publication, when it deems that the regional law exceeds the competence of the Region; while a Region can challenge the constitutional legitimacy of a State or regional law before the Constitutional Court within sixty days from its publication, when it deems that said law infringes upon its competence.

Articles 115, 124, 128, 129, 130 have been repealed, and therefore have not been discussed.

Article 131 establishes the following Regions: Piedmont, Valle d'Aosta, Lombardy, Trentino-Alto Adige, Veneto, Friuli-Venezia Giulia, Liguria, Emilia-Romagna, Tuscany, Umbria, Marche, Lazio, Abruzzi, Molise, Campania, Apulia, Basilicata, Calabria, Sicily and Sardinia. By a constitutional law, after consultation with the Regional Councils, a merger between existing Regions or the creation of new Regions having a minimum of one million inhabitants can be granted, when such request has been made by a number of Municipal Councils representing not less than one third of the populations involved, and the request has been approved by referendum by a majority of said populations. The Provinces and Municipalities which request to be detached from a Region and incorporated in another may be allowed to do so, following a referendum and a law of the Republic, which obtains the majority of the populations of the Province or Provinces and of the Municipality or Municipalities concerned, and after having heard the Regional Councils. Changes in provincial boundaries and the institution of new Provinces within a Region are regulated by the laws of the Republic, on the initiative of the Municipalities, after consultation with the Region. The Region, after consultation with the populations involved, can establish through its laws new Municipalities within its own territory and modify their districts and names.

==== Constitutional Guarantees (Articles 134–139) ====
===== The Constitutional Court (Articles 134–137) =====
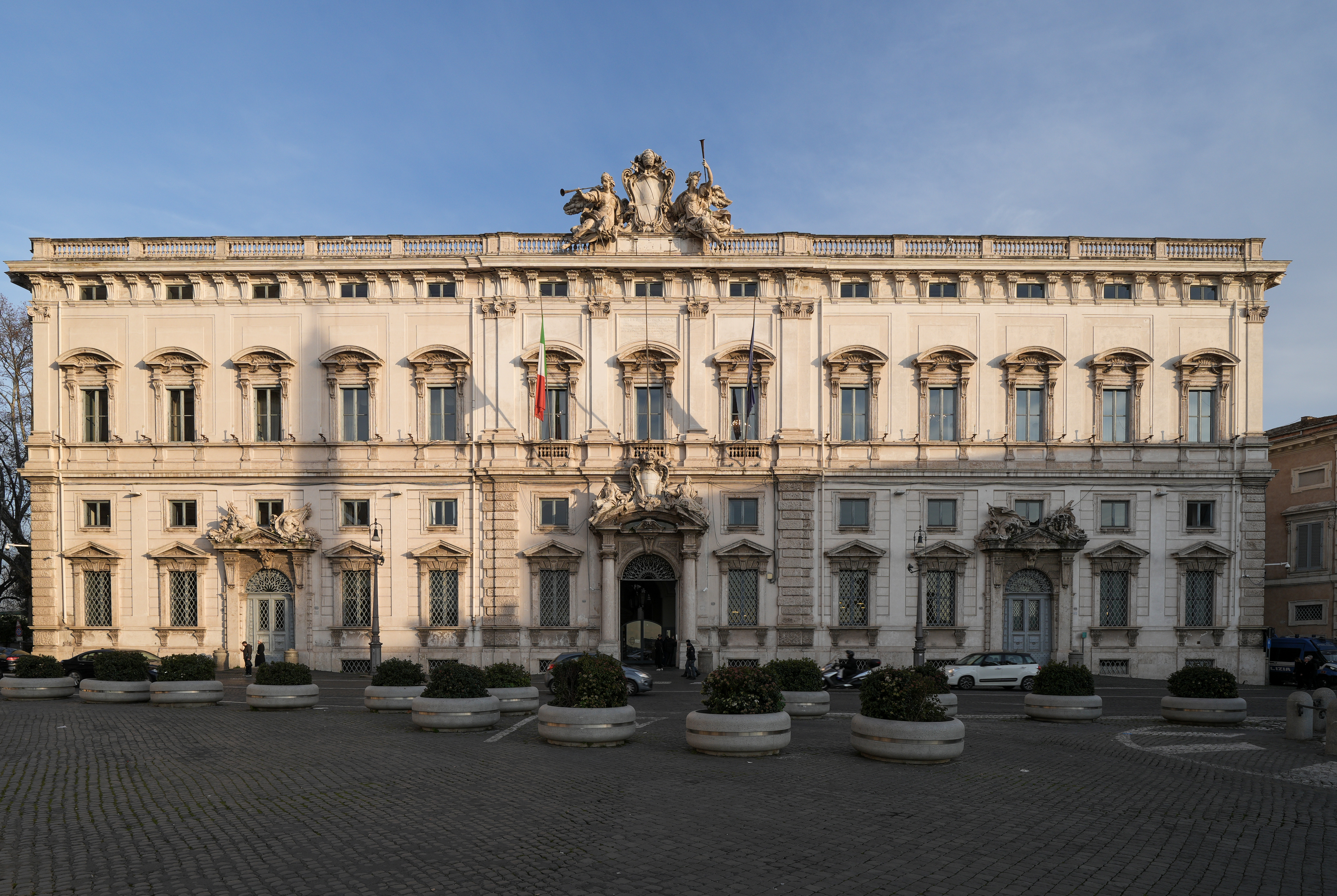
Palazzo della Consulta, seat of the Constitutional Court

Article 134 states that the Constitutional Court shall pass judgement on

- controversies on the constitutional legitimacy of laws and enactments having force of law issued by the State and Regions;
- conflicts arising from allocation of powers of the State and those powers allocated to State and Regions, and between Regions;
- charges brought against the President of the Republic, according to the provisions of the Constitution.

The Constitutional Court is composed of fifteen judges, a third nominated by the President, a third by Parliament in joint sitting and a third by the ordinary and administrative supreme Courts. The judges of the Constitutional Courts must be chosen from among judges, including those retired, of the ordinary and administrative higher Courts, university professors of law and lawyers with at least twenty years practice. Judges of the Constitutional Court are appointed for nine years, beginning in each case from the day of their swearing in, and they cannot be re-appointed. At the expiration of their term, the constitutional judges must leave office and the exercise of the functions thereof. The President of the Court is elected for three years and with the possibility of re-election from among its members, in accordance with the law and respecting in all cases the expiry term for constitutional judges. The office of constitutional judge is incompatible with membership of Parliament, of a Regional Council, the practice of the legal profession, and with every appointment and office indicated by law. In impeachment procedures against the President of the Republic, in addition to the ordinary judges of the Court, there must also be sixteen members chosen by lot from among a list of citizens having the qualification necessary for election to the Senate, which the Parliament prepares every nine years through election using the same procedures as those followed in appointing ordinary judges.

When a law is declared unconstitutional by the Court, the law ceases to have effect the day following the publication of the decision. The decision of the Court must be published and communicated to Parliament and the Regional Councils concerned, so that, wherever they deem it necessary, they shall act in conformity with constitutional procedures. A constitutional law establishes the conditions, forms, terms for proposing judgements on constitutional legitimacy, and guarantees on the independence of constitutional judges. Ordinary laws establishes the other provisions necessary for the constitution and the functioning of the Court. No appeals are allowed against the decision of the Constitutional Court.

===== Amendments to the Constitution. Constitutional Laws (Articles 138–139) =====
Laws amending the Constitution and other constitutional laws must be adopted by each House after two successive debates at intervals of not less than three months, and must be approved by an absolute majority of the members of each House in the second voting. Said laws are submitted to a popular referendum when, within three months of their publication, such request is made by one-fifth of the members of a House or five hundred thousand voters or five Regional Councils. The law submitted to referendum cannot be promulgated if not approved by a majority of valid votes. A referendum is not to be held if the law has been approved in the second voting by each of the Houses by a majority of two-thirds of the members.

Article 139 states that the form of Republic shall not be a matter for constitutional amendment, thus effectively barring any attempt to restore the monarchy.

=== Transitory and Final Provisions (Provisions I–XVIII) ===
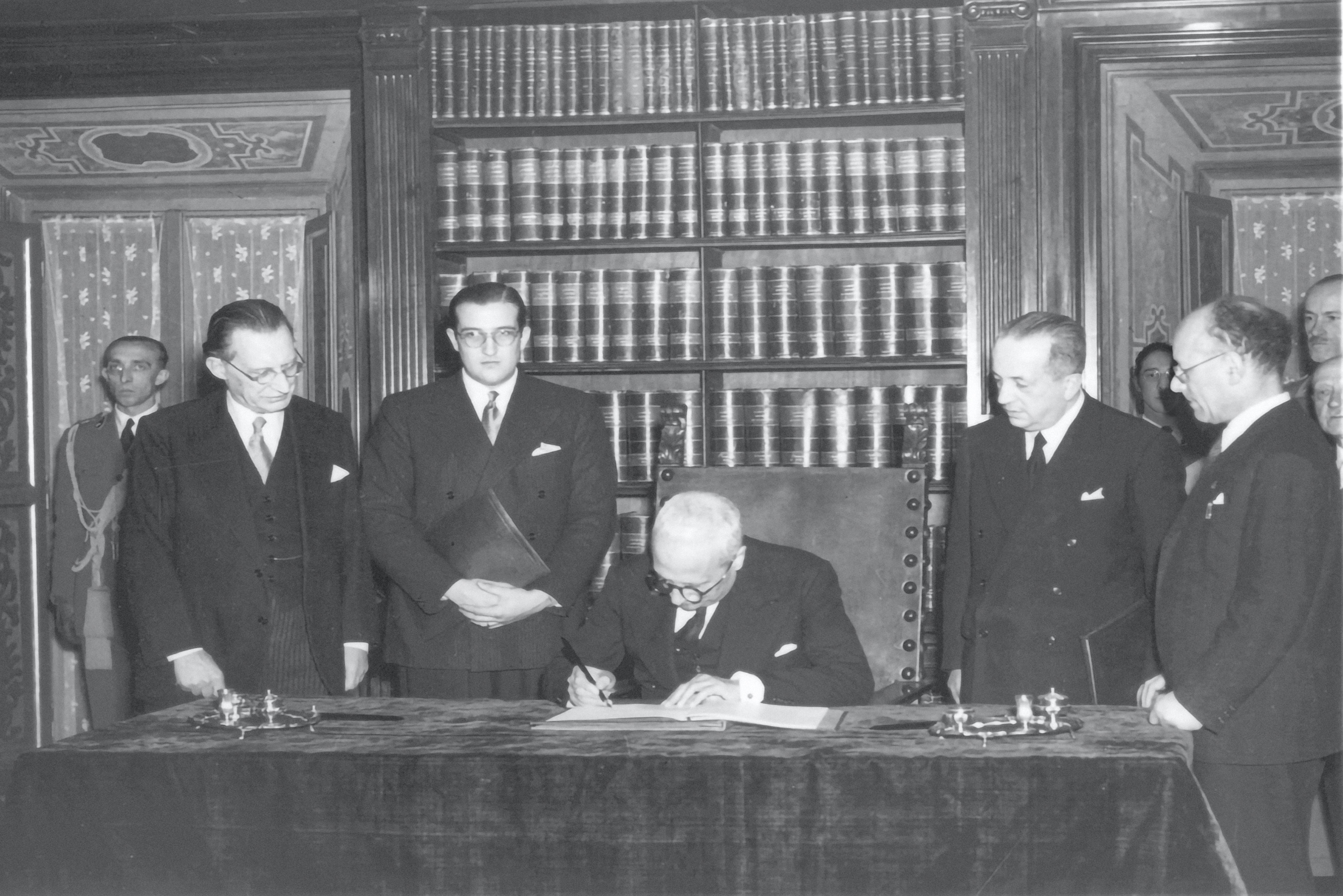
The provisional head of state, Enrico De Nicola, signing the Constitution by virtue of Provision XVIII, on 27 December 1947.

The transitory and final provisions start by declaring the provisional Head of the State the President of the Republic, with the implementation of the Constitution. In case not all Regional Councils had been set up at the date of the election of the next President of the Republic, the Provisions state that only members of the two Houses could participate in the election, while also providing the requirements for appointing the members of the first Senate of the Republic.

The Provisions provide a general timeline for the implementation of the Constitution. For example, Article 80 on the question of international treaties which involve budget expenditures or changes in the law, is declared effective as from the date of convocation of Parliament. Also, within five years after the Constitution has come into effect, the special jurisdictional bodies still in existence must be revised, excluding the jurisdiction of the Council of State, the Court of Accounts, and the military tribunals. Within a year of the same date, a law must provide for the re-organisation of the Supreme Military Tribunal according to Article 111. Moreover, until the Judiciary has been established in accordance with the Constitution, the existing provisions will remain in force. In particular, until the Constitutional Court begins its functions, the decision on controversies indicated in Article 134 will be conducted in the forms and within the limits of the provisions already in existence before the implementation of the Constitution.

The Provisions call for the election of the Regional Councils and the elected bodies of provincial administration within one year of the implementation of the Constitution. The transfer of power from the State to the Regions, as established by the Constitution, as well as the transfer to the Regions of officials and employees of the State, must be regulated by law for every branch of the public administration. Until this process has been completed the Provinces and the Municipalities will retain those functions they presently exercise, as well as those which the Regions may delegate to them. Also, within three years of the implementation of the Constitution, the laws of the Republic must be adjusted to the needs of local autonomies and the legislative jurisdiction attributed to the Regions. Furthermore, up to five years after the implementation of the Constitution, other Regions can be established by constitutional laws, thus amending the list in Article 131, and without the conditions required under the first paragraph of Article 132, without prejudice, however, to the obligation to consult the peoples concerned.

Provision XII forbids the reorganisation of the dissolved Fascist party, under any form whatsoever. Notwithstanding Article 48, the Provision imposes temporary limitations to the right to vote and eligibility of former leaders of the Fascist regime, for a period of no more than five years from the implementation of the Constitution. Similarly, until it was amended in 2002, Provision XIII barred the members and descendants of the House of Savoy from voting, as well as holding public or elected office, and the former kings of the House of Savoy, their spouses and their male descendants were denied access and residence in the national territory. In particular, after the abolition of the monarchy, the former kings Vittorio Emanuele III and Umberto II, went into exile in Egypt and Portugal, respectively. Their heir Vittorio Emanuele made his first trip back to Italy in over half a century on 23 December 2002. Nevertheless, Provision XIII also imposes the confiscation by the State of the assets of the former kings of the House of Savoy, their spouses and their male descendants existing on national territory, while declaring null and void the acquisitions or transfers of said properties which took place after 2 June 1946. Titles of nobility are no longer recognised, while the predicates included in those existing before 28 October 1922 are established as part of the name of the title holders. The Order of Saint Mauritius is preserved as a hospital corporation and its functions are established by law, while the Heraldic Council is suppressed.

With the entry into force of the Constitution, the legislative decree of the Lieutenant of the Realm No. 151 of 25 June 1944 on the provisional organisation of the State will become law. Within one year of the same date, the revision and co-ordination therewith of previous constitutional laws which had not at that moment been explicitly or implicitly abrogated will begin. The Constituent Assembly must pass laws on the election of the Senate of the Republic, special regional statues, and the law governing the press, before 31 January 1948. Until the day of the election of the new Parliament, the Constituent Assembly can be convened to decide on matters attributed by law to its jurisdiction. The Provisions also detail the temporary functions of the Standing Committees, the Legislative Committees, and the Deputies.

Provision XVIII calls for the promulgation of the Constitution by the provisional Head of State within five days of its approval by the Constituent Assembly, and its coming into force on 1 January 1948. The text of the Constitution will be deposited in the Town Hall of every Municipality of the Republic and there made public for the whole of 1948, in order to allow every citizen to know of it. The Constitution, bearing the seal of the State, will be included in the Official Records of the laws and decrees of the Republic. The Constitution must be faithfully observed as the fundamental law of the Republic by all citizens and bodies of the State.

== Amendments ==
In order to make it virtually impossible to replace with a dictatorial regime, it is difficult to modify the Constitution; to do so (under Article 138) requires two readings in each House of Parliament and, if the second of these are carried with a majority (i.e. more than half) but less than two-thirds, a referendum is held if asked for. Under Article 139, the republican form of government cannot be reviewed. When the Constituent Assembly drafted the Constitution, it made a deliberate choice in attributing to it a supra-legislative force, so that ordinary legislation could neither amend nor derogate from it. Legislative acts of parliament in conflict with the Constitution are subsequently annulled by the Constitutional Court.

Three Parliamentary Commissions have been convened in 1983–1985, 1992–1994 and 1997–1998 respectively, with the task of preparing major revisions to the 1948 text (in particular Part II), but in each instance the necessary political consensus for change was lacking.

The text of the Constitution has been amended 16 times. Amendments have affected articles 48 (postal voting), 51 (women's participation), 56, 57 and 60 (composition and length of term of the Chamber of Deputies and Senate of the Republic); 68 (indemnity and immunity of members of Parliament); 79 (amnesties and pardons); 88 (dissolution of the Houses of Parliament); 96 (impeachment); 114 to 132 (Regions, Provinces and Municipalities in its entirety); 134 and 135 (composition and length of term of the Constitutional Court). In 1967 articles 10 and 26 were integrated by a constitutional provision which established that their last paragraphs (which forbid the extradition of a foreigner for political offences) do not apply in case of crimes of genocide.

Four amendments were presented during the thirteenth legislature (1996–2001), these concerned parliamentary representation of Italians living abroad; the devolution of powers to the Regions; the direct election of Regional Presidents; and guarantees of fair trials in courts. A constitutional law and one amendment were also passed in the fourteenth legislature (2001–2006), namely, the repealing of disposition XIII insofar as it limited the civil rights of the male descendants of the House of Savoy; and a new provision intended to encourage women's participation in politics.

Further amendments are being debated, but for the time being 61.32% of those voting in the 25–26 June 2006 referendum rejected a major Reform Bill approved by both Houses on 17 November 2005, despite its provisions were diluted in time; the attempt to revise Part II appears to have been abandoned or at least postponed, but in 2014 its parts on bicameralism has been resumed by Renzi Government in a partially different draft.

In 2007, the constitution was amended making capital punishment illegal in all cases (before this the Constitution prohibited the death penalty except "in the cases provided for by military laws in case of war;" however, no one had been sentenced to death since 1947 and the penalty was abolished from military law in 1994).

Articles 81, 97, 117 and 119 were amended on 20 April 2012, introducing the requirement of a balanced budget at both the national and the regional level, taking into account both positive and negative variations of the economic cycle.

Articles 56, 57, and 59 were amended on 19 October 2020, reducing the total number of parliamentarians by about one third, and capping the total number of senators for life appointed by the President at five in all cases.

Article 58 was amended on 18 October 2021, lowering the voting age for the Senate from 25 to 18 years old, the same as the Chamber of Deputies.

Articles 9 and 41 were amended on 8 February 2022, introducing legal frameworks for the protection of the environment, the biodiversity, and the ecosystems.

== Notable Members of the Constituent Assembly ==
The following is a list of notable members of the Constituent Assembly:

- Leonetto Amadei (PSI), future President of the Constitutional Court
- Gaspare Ambrosini (DC), jurist
- Giorgio Amendola (PCI), writer
- Giulio Andreotti (DC), future Prime Minister and life Senator
- Lelio Basso (PSI), journalist
- Bianca Bianchi (PSI), teacher and writer
- Ivanoe Bonomi (GM), former Prime Minister
- Piero Calamandrei (PdA), university professor and author
- Emilio Colombo (DC), future Prime Minister and life Senator
- Benedetto Croce (PLI), philosopher
- Alcide De Gasperi (DC), incumbent Prime Minister
- Florestano Di Fausto (DC), architect and engineer
- Giuseppe Di Vittorio (PCI), trade unionist
- Luigi Einaudi (PLI), future President
- Amintore Fanfani (DC), future Prime Minister
- Vittorio Foa (PdA), trade unionist
- Antonio Giolitti (PCI), future minister
- Angela Gotelli (DC), teacher
- Giovanni Gronchi (DC), future President
- Leonilde Iotti (PCI), future President of the Chamber of Deputies
- Giovanni Leone (DC), future President
- Girolamo Li Causi (PCI), future PCI leader
- Luigi Longo (PCI), future PCI secretary
- Emilio Lussu (PdA), writer
- Gaetano Martino (PLI), future President of the European Parliament
- Bernardo Mattarella (DC), future minister
- Teresa Mattei (PCI), former partisan
- Lina Merlin (PSI), teacher
- Aldo Moro (DC), future Prime Minister
- Pietro Nenni (PSI), future Foreign Minister
- Francesco Saverio Nitti (UDN), former Prime Minister
- Umberto Nobile (PCI), Air Force General and explorer
- Teresa Noce (PCI), labor leader and journalist
- Vittorio Emanuele Orlando (GM), former Prime Minister
- Randolfo Pacciardi (PRI), future Defense Minister
- Ferruccio Parri (PRI), former Prime Minister
- Giuseppe Pella (DC), future Prime Minister
- Sandro Pertini (PSI), future President
- Maria Maddalena Rossi (PCI), former partisan and journalist
- Paolo Rossi (PSI), future President of the Constitutional Court
- Giuseppe Saragat (PSDI), future President
- Oscar Luigi Scalfaro (DC), future President
- Antonio Segni (DC), future President
- Carlo Sforza (PRI), future Foreign Minister
- Paolo Emilio Taviani (DC), future Interior Minister
- Umberto Terracini (PCI), President of the Constituent Assembly
- Palmiro Togliatti (PCI), incumbent Justice Minister
- Umberto Tupini (DC), future minister

== See also ==
=== Former constitutions ===
- First Cisalpine Constitution (1797)
- Second Cisalpine Constitution (1798)
- Third Cisalpine Constitution (1801)
- Italian Constitution (1802)
- Constitutional Statute of Italy (1805)
- Statuto Albertino (1848)

=== Others ===
- Birth of the Italian Republic
- Constitutional laws of Italy
- History of Italy
- Politics of Italy
- Post-World War II Basic Law for the Federal Republic of Germany
- Post-World War II Constitution of Japan
- Rule according to higher law
- Treaty establishing a Constitution for Europe
- Treaty of Peace with Italy, 1947
