= Constitution of Italy (1802) =

The Constitution of the Italian Republic (Italian: Costituzione della Repubblica Italiana), was the constitution of the Italian Republic, a client republic of France under Napoleon Bonaparte, roughly comprising the modern-day northern regions of Lombardy and Emilia-Romagna. It came into effect on 26 January 1802.

== See also ==
- Statuto Albertino
- Constitution of Italy
- Constitutional Statute of Italy
