= Statuto Albertino =

Constitution of the kingdoms of Sardinia (1848–61) and unified Italy (1861–1948)

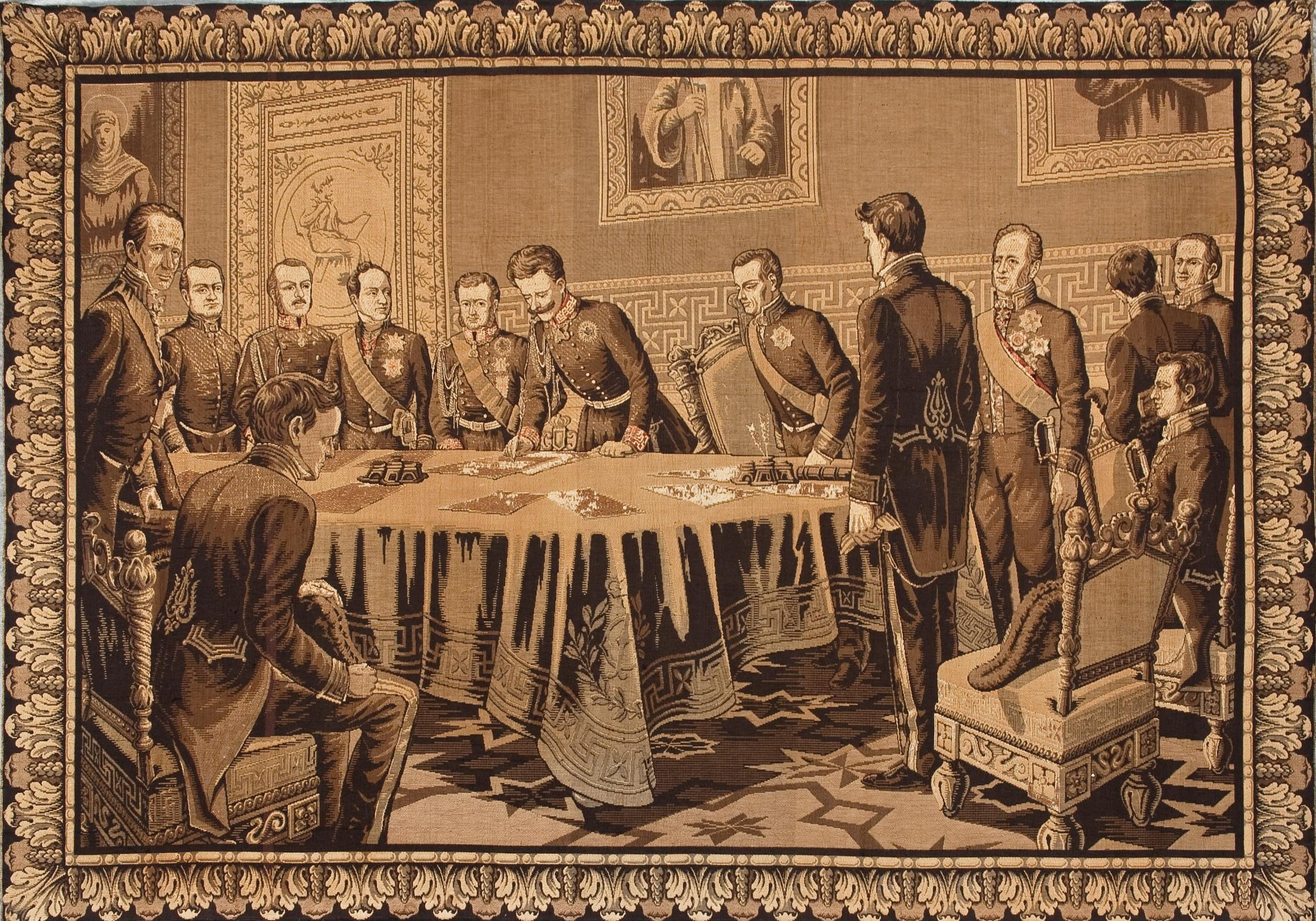
Charles Albert signs the Statute, 4 March 1848.

The Statuto Albertino (English: Albertine Statute) was the constitution granted by King Charles Albert of Sardinia to the Kingdom of Sardinia on 4 March 1848 and written in Italian and French. Promulgated at the height of the Risorgimento, the process of Italian unification, the Statute was gradually extended to the other territories incorporated into the new state and was officially recognized as the fundamental law of the Kingdom of Italy upon its proclamation on 17 March 1861. Because of this, Statuto Albertino became the first Italian constitution and had a role in shaping Italy's constitutional system, exerting an influence on the 1947 Constitution of Italy, which directly succeeded it. The Statute remained in force, with changes for a century, until 1948. Charles Albert did not want to grant a Constitutional Charter so he attempted to maintain as much power as he could even though the Statute marked the end of his absolute monarchy.

The Constitution established a uninominal-majoritarian electoral system and initially gave suffrage to wealthy males over the age of 25. In 1919, the uninominal-majoritarian system was altered into a proportional representation system. Today the Statuto Albertino is regarded as one of the most important historical legal acts issued on the territory of Italy.

== Background ==
=== Origins of the Statute and its promulgation ===
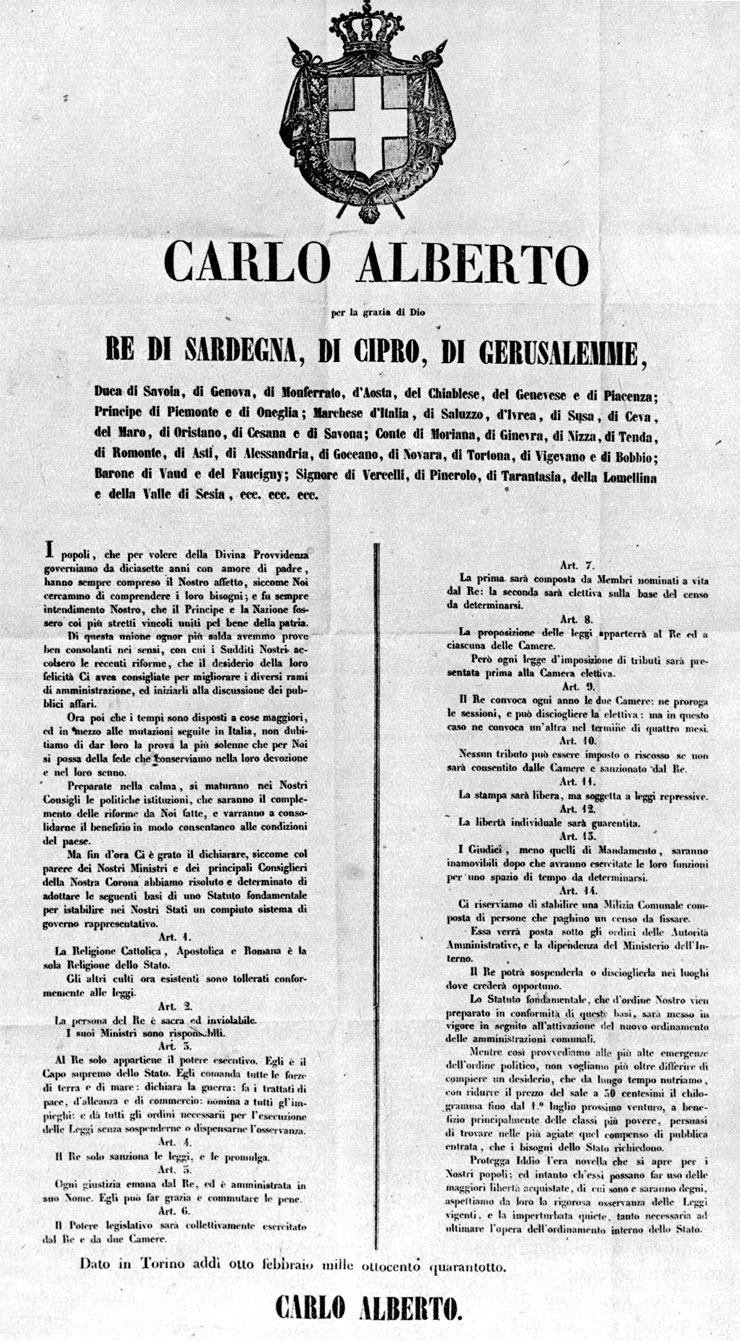
Notice of the proclamation of the Albertine Statute.

The Statute was proclaimed only because of concern at the revolutionary insurrection agitating Italy in 1848. Its origins, however, went back further. In the mid-1830s, in the Kingdom of Sardinia ruled by the House of Savoy, mass demonstrations by the burgher class demanding the expansion of civil rights began. At the same time, dissatisfaction was growing among the peasantry, who were exploited due to the existence of an inefficient feudal system. By the mid-19th century, more than a dozen legal acts of a constitutional nature were already in force in the Italian states, some of which had been granted by Napoleon Bonaparte.

Already in 1831, the Sardinian king Charles Albert announced a program of administrative reforms, while simultaneously establishing a legislative commission composed of judges and lawyers who deliberated under the chairmanship of the Minister of Justice, Giuseppe Barbaroux. The body was divided into sections: civil law, civil procedure, criminal law, and commercial law. At the same time, in response to increasingly violent riots, the absolutist policy previously pursued by the king was softened. In 1831, a draft civil code was developed, clearly inspired by the Napoleonic Code. After lengthy consultations with the Supreme Court and the Council of State (an administrative court), its final version was approved in 1837, with an entry into force date of 1 January 1838. The new code was to apply to the continental part of the Kingdom of Sardinia (Piedmont, Savoy, and Liguria), excluding the island of Sardinia. Two years later, the criminal code (with an entry into force date of 15 January 1840), the military criminal code, and in 1847, a code of criminal procedure based on the principle of public trials were issued. In 1847, censorship was also limited, and, among other things, the publication of political periodicals was permitted. At the same time, administrative and systemic reforms continued.

Despite the progressing changes, King Charles Albert remained reluctant to introduce any act of a constitutional nature, and due to social pressures on this issue, he also considered announcing his abdication. The turning point was the granting of a constitution to the Kingdom of the Two Sicilies by Ferdinand II at the beginning of 1848. Thanks to this, as well as due to pressures from the National Guard, Charles Albert also decided to adopt and announce on 8 February 1848 the fundamental law of the state he ruled – the Fundamental Statute of the Kingdom of Sardinia (Italian: Statuto Fondamentale del Regno di Sardegna), which was officially promulgated on 4 March 1848 in Turin, which was de facto the capital of the Kingdom of Sardinia.

The society of the Kingdom of Sardinia received the statute with great enthusiasm, which was confirmed by the ceremonies that took place as early as 27 February 1848, even before the promulgation of the act. It was established that the first Sunday in June would be a day commemorating the Statute – this date became a point of reference and a holiday for Italian monarchists up to the present day. At the time, Charles Albert was only following the example of other Italian rulers, but his Statute was the only constitution to survive the repression that followed the First War of Independence (1848–49).

=== Making the Statute the fundamental law of the Kingdom of Italy ===
The special features of the Albertine Statute (its concise form and the lack of a special procedure required for making changes to it, which gave it flexibility) and the favorable political situation meant that its provisions were extended to the territories of successive Italian states joining the new state entity, formed as part of the process of unifying Italian lands initiated at the beginning of the 19th century (Italian: Risorgimento), until it was finally recognized as the constitution of the Kingdom of Italy by virtue of the law proclaiming the kingdom, Law No. 4671 (Law No. 1) of 17 March 1861, signed by the first King of Italy, Victor Emmanuel II.

The Statute remained the basis of the legal system after Italian unification was achieved in 1860 and the Kingdom of Sardinia became the Kingdom of Italy. It also remained in force between 1922 and 1943, when the fascist government led by Benito Mussolini held power, although significant changes were introduced that distorted Italy's constitutional system. These changes allowed the Kingdom of Italy, previously a model parliamentary monarchy, to be transformed into a one-party authoritarian state, with the monarchical system reduced to a mere facade for fascist policy.

=== Final years of the Statute's enforcement and the new Italian constitution ===
Even though it suffered deep modifications, especially during the fascist government of Benito Mussolini (who ruled with the tacit approval of King Victor Emmanuel III), the Statute lasted mostly unaltered in the structure until the implementation of the republican constitution in 1948, which superseded several primary features of the document, with specific regard to those of monarchical nature. With the fall of the fascist government, the question arose of adopting a new model for the state system. King Victor Emmanuel III appointed his son Umberto II to perform royal duties, and the enforcement of the monarchical Albertine Statute was confirmed by the Pact of Salerno, signed in April 1944 by the ruler and the National Liberation Committee. In July 1944, the government of Prime Minister Ivanoe Bonomi issued a provisional constitution, temporarily granting legislative power to the government, which could issue decrees with the force of law subject to approval by the acting royal deputy. By such a decree, the Italian people were entrusted with the choice between monarchy and republic through a referendum.

The referendum on the Italian system took place on 2 June 1946, simultaneously with elections for members of the Constituent Assembly of Italy. It was participated in by 89% of eligible voters, with more than half voting for a republican form of government. Less than two weeks later, Umberto II went into exile in Portugal. Work on the new constitution continued until 25 February 1947, and on 22 December 1947, the fundamental law was adopted by the assembly with 458 votes in favor and 62 against. The Italian republican constitution entered into force on 1 January 1948, definitively ending the 100-year period of enforcement of the Albertine Statute.

== Provisions ==
=== Preamble ===
The preamble of the Statute consists of an enacting formula that reaffirms the authority of the King, in the context of the unrest that was sweeping across Europe and the Kingdom, by stating:

CARLO ALBERTO, by the grace of God, KING OF SARDINIA, OF CYPRUS, AND OF JERUSALEM Etc., Etc., Etc.

With regal loyalty and fatherly love We come today to accomplish what We had announced to Our most beloved subjects with Our proclamation of the 8th of the February last, with which We wanted to demonstrate, in the midst of the extraordinary events which surround the country, how Our confidence in them increases with the gravity of the circumstances and, heeding only of the impulses of Our heart, how determined is Our intention to adapt their destiny to the spirit of the times, for the interest and for the dignity of the Nation.

Having considered the broad and strong representative institutions contained in the present Fundamental Statute to be the most certain means of redoubling with the links of indissoluble affection that bind to Our Italian Crown a People who have given Us so many proofs of faith, of obedience and of love, We have determined to sanction it and to promulgate it, in the faith that God will bless Our intentions, and that the free, strong and happy Nation will always show itself ever more worthy of its ancient fame and will deserve a glorious future. For this reason, by Our certain Royal authority, having had the opinion of Our Concil, We have ordered and We do order with the force of Statute and fundamental Law, perpetual and irrevocable from the Monarchy, that which follows:

=== The State (Articles 1–23) ===
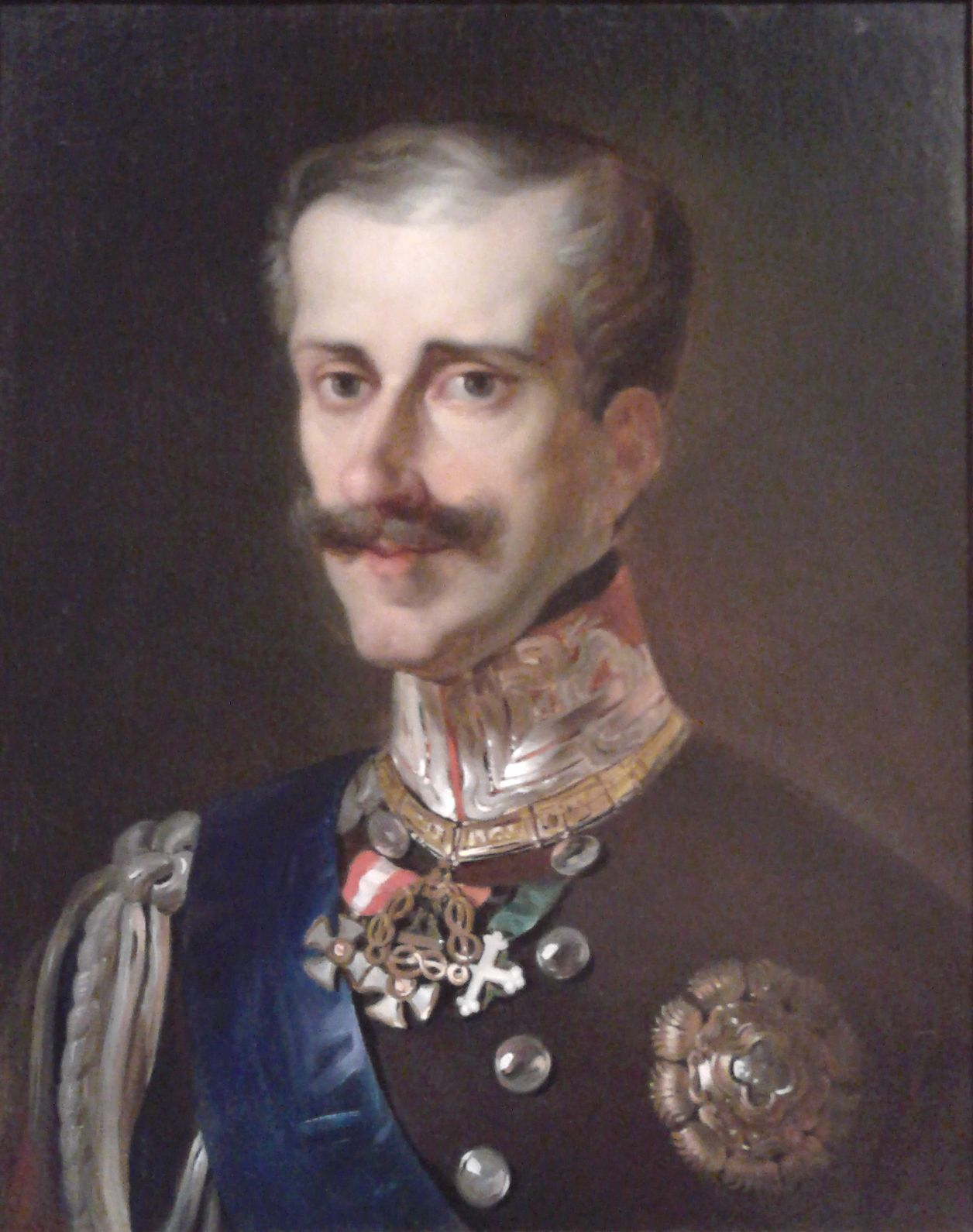
Portrait of Charles Albert of Sardinia

The Statute starts by establishing Roman Catholicism as the sole state religion while freedom of religion was granted for all existing forms of worship, in conformity with the law (Article No.1). The Kingdom of Italy was a representative monarchy, with an hereditary crown, in accordance with the Salic law, which effectively limited succession to male members of the royal family (Article No.2). Legislative power was exercised collectively by the King, the Senate and the Chamber of Deputies (Article No.3). Executive power was vested in the King alone (Article No.5), who was declared to be "sacred and inviolable" (Article No.4).

Among the powers of the King were the capacity to

- declare war, as commander-in-chief of all the armed forces.
- conclude treaties of peace, of alliance, of commerce and others. He was required to notify the Chambers of these treaties except in circumstances where vital state interests and national security concerns forbade it. However, treaties entailing either a financial burden or changes in the territories of the State had to be ratified by the Chambers.
- appoint all state officials.
- sign bills into law and promulgate them, as well as issue the decrees and regulations necessary for their execution. The Article No.7 also gave the King the ability to withhold countersignature.
- propose new legislation, a power shared with the Chambers. However, taxation and appropriations bills were required to originate in the Chamber of Deputies.
- annually convene the Chambers, prorogue them and dissolve the Chamber of Deputies, with the proviso that a new Chamber must be convened within four months of its dissolution.
- grant clemency and commute sentences.

The King reached majority at the age of eighteen. During his minority, the prince most closely related to him in accordance with the order of succession served as regent to the throne and tutor of the King, taking this last duty from the Queen Mother after the King turned seven. If that prince was younger than 21, these duties passed to the next in line, until the King reached majority. In the absence of male relatives, the Queen Mother served as regent. If there was no Queen Mother, the ministers were required to convene the Chambers within ten days to name a regent. The same procedures applied in the event of physical incapacity of the reigning King, but if the crown prince was already of age, he automatically became regent.

The Statute established the economic benefits and privileges of the Crown and the members of the royal family, reaffirming also the King's ownership of His assets, which included royal palaces, villas and gardens, as well as all His personal properties. Of these assets the Statute mandated an inventory to be compiled and regularly updated by the responsible Minister.

During the coronation, the King was required to swear before both Chambers to act in accordance with the Statute, while the regent was required to swear loyalty to the King and the Statute.

=== The Rights and Duties of Citizens (Articles 24–32) ===
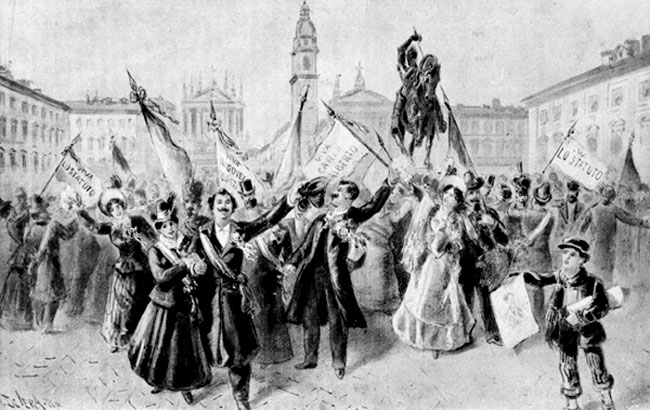
Celebrations in Turin for the proclamation of the Albertine Statute, in 1848.

The Statute declared all citizens equal before the law, with equal civil and political rights regardless of ranks and titles, and made all citizens eligible for civil and military offices, except for the restrictions provided by the law. All citizens were required to pay taxes in proportion to their possessions.

The Statute did not explicitly exclude women from the right to vote (Article No.24), this led to controversies as Courts disagreed with each other until the precedent of the Supreme Court forbidding women to vote.

The Statute granted the rights of habeas corpus, guaranteeing personal liberty and inviolability of the residence. Nobody could be arrested or brought to trial, or have his home searched, except in those cases and in the manners prescribed by the law. All properties were inviolable. However, if public interest mandated it, citizens could be required to give up all or part of their property with due compensation and in accordance with the law.

Freedom of the press was granted, but the government was empowered to punish abuses of this freedom. Moreover, the Statute granted the Bishops the sole authority to grant permission to print bibles, catechisms, liturgical and prayer books until 1870. Citizens had the right to freely assemble, peacefully and unarmed (the right to keep and bear arms was not recognised), though the government could regulate this right in the interest of public welfare. However, assemblies in public places were still subjected to police regulation.

Taxes could not be levied or collected without the consent of the Chambers and the King. The public debt is guaranteed and every obligation of the State to its creditors had to be met.

=== The Senate (Articles 33–38) ===
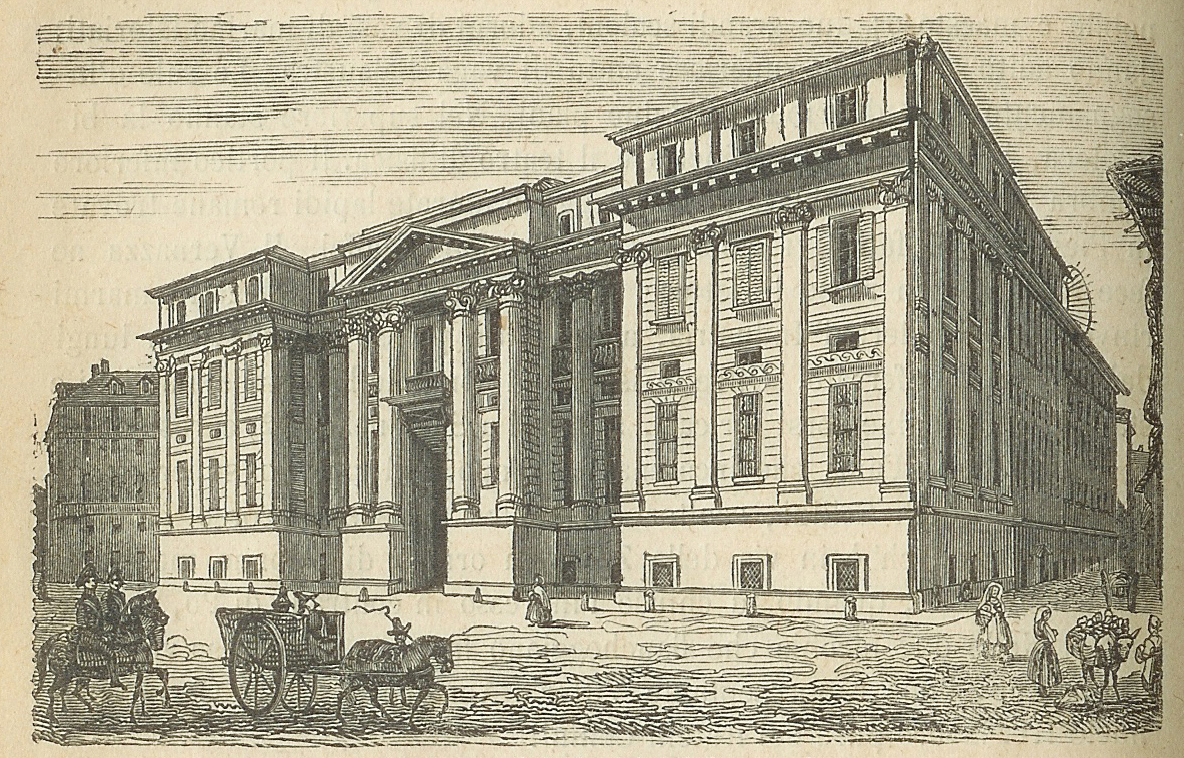
Engraving of the Palace of the Supreme Magistrates in Turin, known also as Palace of the Senate of Savoy.

Senators were appointed by the King for life, and had to be at least 40 years old. The Statute gave a list of different categories among which senators were chosen, with different criteria and requirements for each category. The list included Archbishops and Bishops of the State; Presidents and members of the Chamber of Deputies; Ministers of the State; Ambassadors and Special Envoys; Presidents, Attorneys and Councillors of the Court of Cassation, the Court of Accounts or the Appeal Courts; Generals and Admirals; State Councillors; Members of the Royal Academy of Science and of the High Council of Public Education; and other citizens who have distinguished themselves through their services, achievements and contributions. The Royal Princes were members of the Senate by right from the age of 21 onward, with full voting rights after the age of 25, sitting immediately after the President.

The President and the vice-president of the Senate were appointed by the King, while the Secretaries were chosen by the Senate. By Royal decree, the Senate could be empowered to sit as a High Court of Justice to judge crimes of high treason and other crimes against national security, and to judge ministers accused by the Chamber of Deputies. In these circumstances, the Senate did not constitute a political entity and had only focus on the judicial affairs for which it was convened.

No senator could be arrested without an order of the Senate, except when they were apprehended in flagrante delicto. The Senate had the sole authority to judge its members, and was also responsible for archiving royal births, marriages and deaths.

=== The Chamber of Deputies (Articles 39–47) ===
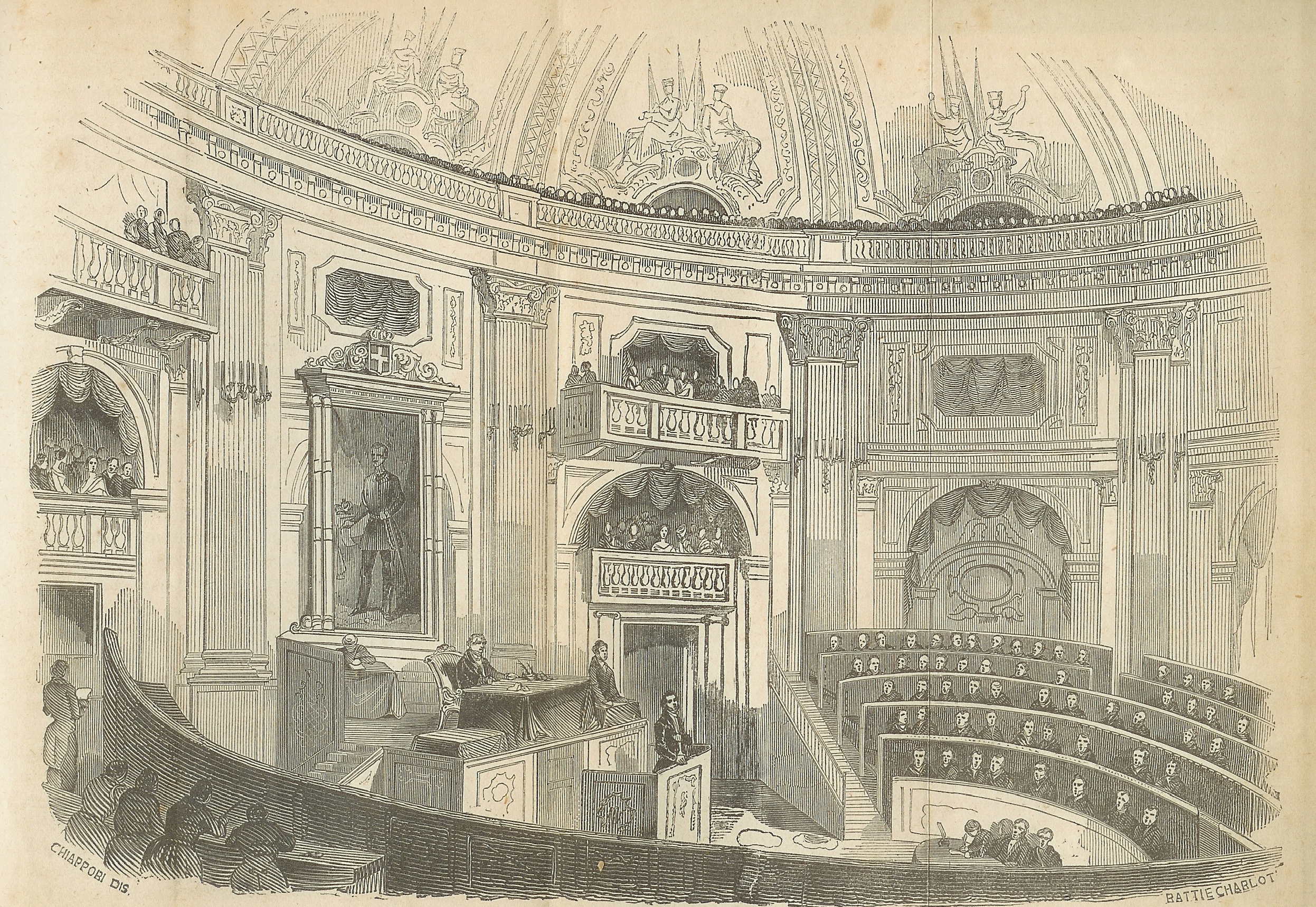
Engraving representing the Chambers of Deputies of the Kingdom of Sardinia (1852), in Carignano Palace, Turin.

The Chamber of Deputies was popularly elected, and was composed of members chosen from their constituencies in conformity with the law. Deputies were required to be Italian subjects, at least 30 years old, enjoy civil and political rights and fulfill all other requirements established by the law. Deputies were elected for at least five years, unless the Chamber was dissolved before then, and they represented the nation as a whole, with no binding mandate from their individual constituencies.

The Chamber of Deputies elected its own President, vice-president and Secretaries at the beginning of each session for its entire duration. If a Deputy ceased, for whatever reason, to fulfill his functions, new elections were required to be held in his constituency as soon as possible.

No Deputy could be arrested while the Chamber is in session, except when apprehended in flagrante delicto, nor could he be brought before a court in a criminal proceeding without the prior consent of the Chamber. A Deputy could not be arrested for indebtedness while the Chamber was in session, nor during the three weeks immediately preceding and following a session.

The Chamber had the right to impeach the King's Ministers and bring them to trial before the High Court of Justice, which was the Senate.

=== Provisions Common to Both Chambers (Articles 48–64) ===
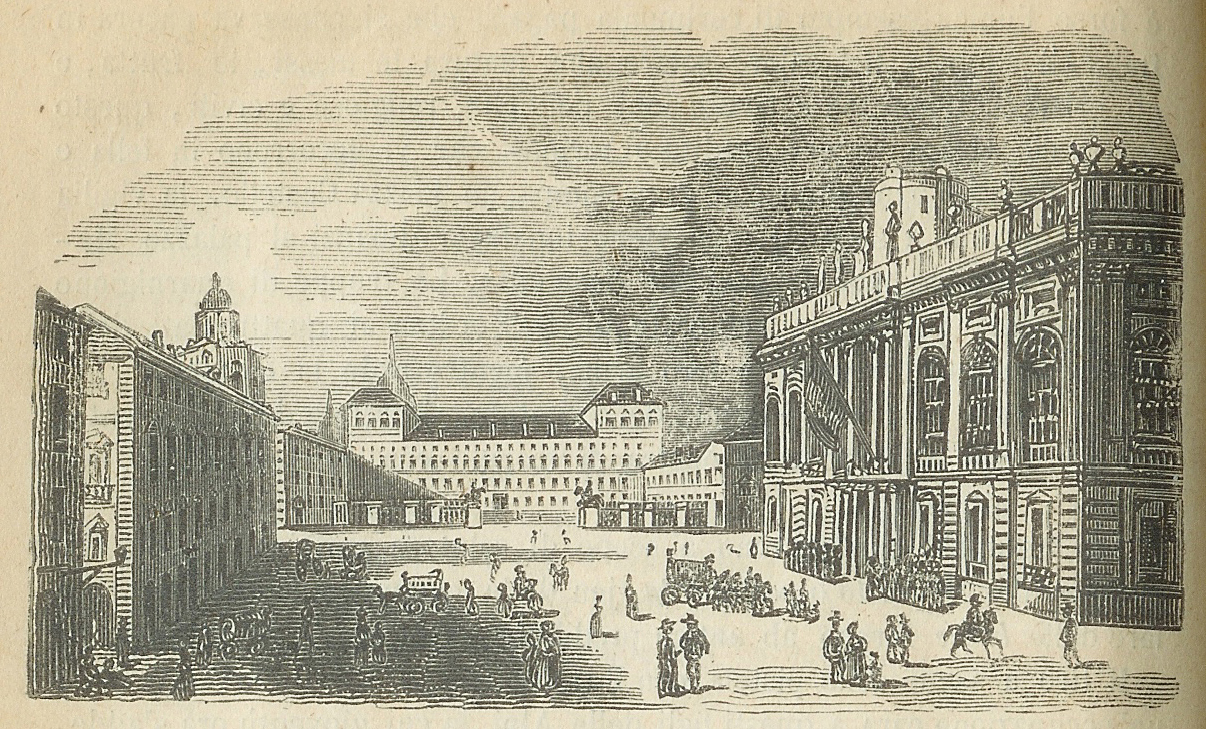
Engraving of Turin's Piazza Castello, with the Royal Palace in the center, Palazzo Madama in the front right, and Palazzo Chiablese back left.

The sessions of the Chambers were required to start and finish at the same time. Any meeting of one chamber convened while the other was out of session was illegal, and its proceedings were null and void.

Before taking office, Senators and Deputies took an oath to be loyal to the King, to loyally observe the Statute and the laws of the State, and to exercise their functions with the sole aim of the inseparable good of the King and of the nation.

Senators and deputies served without pay. They could not be held accountable for opinions expressed and votes given in the Chambers. Sittings of the Chambers were public, but they could deliberate in closed session when requested in written form by ten members.

An absolute majority of members of each chamber had to be present for the sitting to be legal. Deliberations were taken by majority vote. All bills had to be examined by the committees, and had to be approved article by article by both Chambers before being transmitted to the King for his approval. If a bill was rejected in either Chamber or vetoed by the King, it could not be reintroduced during the same session.

Every citizen over the age of 21 had the right to send petitions to the Chambers by way of the proper authorities. The petitions were then examined by the Chambers through their committees to determine if they were worthy of consideration. If they were considered worthy, they were sent to the responsible Minister or offices. The Senate and Chamber of Deputies could only hear from their own Members, the Ministers and the Government's Commissioners. Each Chamber had the sole authority to judge the validity and eligibility of its own members, and to establish its own internal rules regarding the exercise of its functions.

No one could be a Senator and a Deputy at the same time. Voting could be done by standing and sitting, by division into groups or by secret ballot, the last being mandatory while voting on a bill in its entirety, or on provisions personally concerning the Members.

Italian was defined as the working language of both chambers. However, members could use French if they represented areas in which it is used, or in response to the same.

=== The Ministers (Articles 65–67) ===
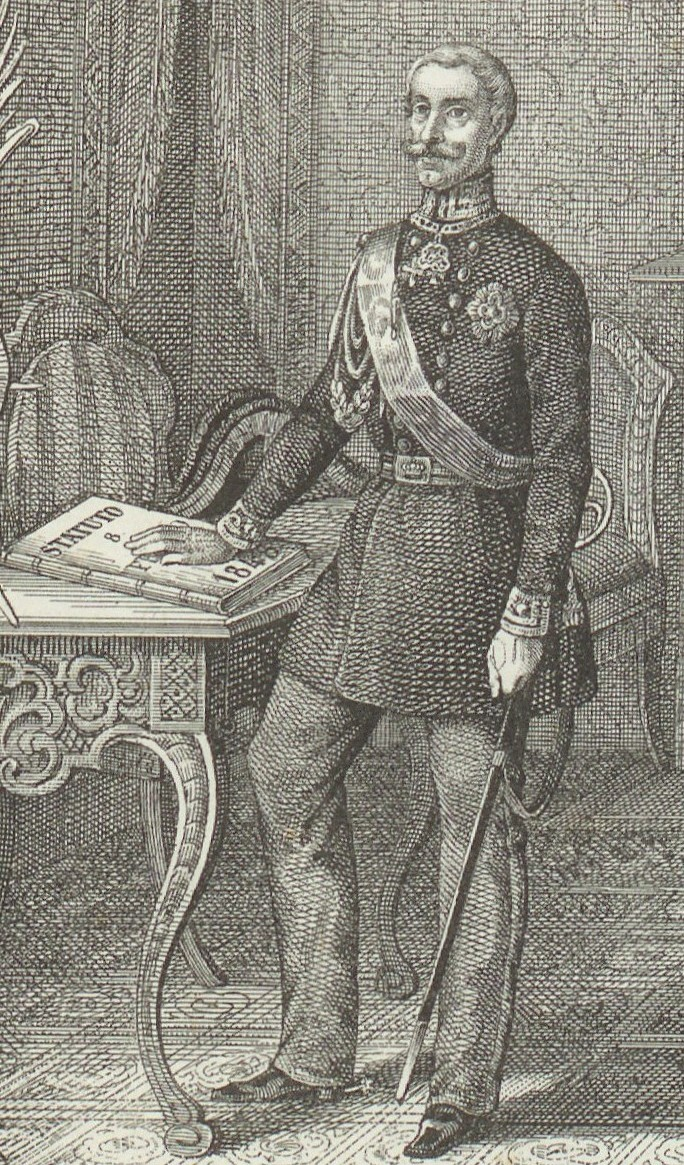
Memorial portrait of Carlo Alberto of Savoy with his right hand posed on the Statute, 1849

The King appointed and dismissed the Ministers. They could not vote in either Chamber unless they were members. They had the right of entrance to both Chambers and the right to speak upon request. Ministers were legally responsible for government acts, and all laws and acts had to be countersigned by a Minister in order to take effect.

Originally, while ministers were legally responsible to the Chambers, they were politically responsible only to the King. However, as the power and prestige of the Chambers grew over the years, it became virtually impossible for a King to appoint a ministry entirely of his own choosing, or keep it in office against the express will of the Chambers. As a result, it became a well-established convention that ministers were both legally and politically responsible to the Chambers, notwithstanding the Statuto's provision that the King alone held executive power. This convention was so firmly established that when Benito Mussolini consolidated his power, he passed a law explicitly stating that he was not responsible to the Chambers.

The Statute granted the King the power to appoint and dismiss ministers (Article 65). They could not, in theory unlike in practice, be removed by anyone apart from the King because executive power belonged to the King alone (Article 5); Victor Emmanuel III was the first and the last to make use of the large might of this provision by appointing Mussolini and letting it be known he would not dismiss him if the Chambers withdrew confidence from him.

=== The Judiciary (Articles 68–73) ===
The King appointed all judges, who administered justice in his name. Except for cantonal judges, judges were irremovable after three years of service.

The Statute provided for the retention of all courts, tribunals, and judges that existed at the time it came into force. The judicial organization could only be altered by legislation. No one could be withdrawn from his ordinary legal jurisdiction. Consequently, no extraordinary tribunals or commissions could be created.

Proceedings of tribunals in civil matters and hearings in criminal matters were public, in conformity with the law. The courts did not exercise judicial review, as the interpretation of laws was the responsibility of the legislature.

=== General Provisions (Articles 74–81) ===
The law regulated the institutions of the Provinces and Comuni, as well as their districts. The law also regulated the military service and the communal militia. All laws contrary to the Statute were declared void.

The State retained the flag and the existing Orders of Knighthood, with their privileges in their own institutions, while the King could create new Orders and establish their statutes. Titles of nobility were maintained by those with a right to them, while the King could confer new ones. No one could receive decorations, titles, or pensions from a foreign power without the authorization of the King.

=== Transitory Provisions (Articles 82–84) ===
The Statute took effect on the day of the first meeting of the Chambers, which was required to take place immediately after the election. Until then, public service was provided by urgent and sovereign dispositions in the forms that were followed before the adoption of the Statute.

For the execution of the Statute, the King reserved the right to make laws on the press, on the elections, on the communal militia and the rearrangement of the State Council. Until the publication of the laws on the press, the previous laws remained in effect.

The Ministers were appointed and responsible for the execution and the full observance of the transitional dispositions.

== Characteristics ==
The Albertine Statute is an example of an act regulating the system of a constitutional monarchy, modeled on the French Charter of Louis XVIII from 1814 (taking into account its amendments due to the July Revolution of 1830). Despite the establishment and endowment of legislative and judicial bodies with specific powers, the king remained the real head of state and the dominant entity of executive power. The Statute provided the monarch with extensive powers, ranging from supreme command over the armed forces, appointing and nominating ministers, to the authority to dissolve parliamentary chambers and appoint members of the Senate. These latter powers, ensuring the king's influence over the legislative branch, guaranteed his strong position within the state.

The Statute played a significant role in shaping Italy's constitutional system. Its historical importance stemmed from its concise form and the absence of a special procedure required for amendments, making it a flexible act. By deferring the regulation of numerous key constitutional matters to statutory legislation, it allowed for broad modifications to the state's political system. Through changes to constitutional provisions regarding elections (liberalization of electoral law), it was possible to influence the actual shape of political representation and, consequently, the manner of exercising power. Over time, the flexibility of the Italian fundamental law led to a shift from a constitutional monarchy toward a parliamentary monarchy, with the king's role increasingly limited.

During the fascist regime, significant changes were introduced to the Statute's provisions, effectively transforming the state's system. An example is the law passed in November 1923, which granted the party winning the elections, with at least 25% of the vote, two-thirds of the seats in the Chamber of Deputies, with the remaining third distributed proportionally among other parties. This law enabled the National Fascist Party to gain full power while marginalizing the significance of other parties.

Despite losing its legal force, the Albertine Statute influenced the form of the modern Italian constitution. This is evident, for example, in the structure of the Italian parliament, with the Chamber of Deputies and the Senate, whose operations largely draw on the Statute's regulations.

== Reactions ==
The subjects of the Kingdom celebrated for the first time the grant of the Constitution on 27 February 1848 but the day of celebration later became the first Sunday of June. This national day originally meant to represent the achievement of liberty but by time the national day was seen as a celebration to the monarchy itself, and continued to be seen in the same way even after Benito Mussolini acquired power.

== Back to the Statute ==
Since the first years of the Statute's life, a practice had developed which had apparently shifted the form of Government of the Kingdom from the pure constitutional one (like the Constitution of the German Empire of 1871, or of the French Constitutions of 1814 and 1830, in which the Government had to enjoy the trust of the King and him alone, and Parliament had no say in its physiological course), to a parliamentary form that recalled that of the British cabinet.

This customary development was contested by Sidney Sonnino when, in January 1897, published an article, Torniamo allo Statuto (Let's go back to the Statute) in which he called for the replacement of government of the parliamentary type with government of the "constitutional" type. This became the political manifesto of the right-wing parties for two decades.

Indeed, from an analysis of various critical junctures in the history of the Kingdom of Italy, it was believed that the substance of power has always been in the hands of the King alone and the few men who enjoyed his trust. Many elements confirm this impression: just three people «led Italy to participate in the First World War (King, Prime Minister and Minister of Foreign Affairs), precisely in strict application of Article 5 of the Statute, without Parliament being able to formally express an orientation about the war».

== See also ==
- Constitution of Italy
- Lateran Treaty
