= 1980 in Nordic music =

The following is a list of notable events and releases that happened in Nordic music in 1980.

== Events ==
- 9 March – Abba arrive in Japan on the first leg of their final world tour.
- 19 April – At the 25th Eurovision Song Contest, Sweden is the highest-placed Scandinavian country, finishing in 10th place. Denmark finish 14th, Norway 16th and Finland 19th.
- December
  - Icelandic punk band Þeyr release their debut Þagað í Hel, but the vinyl pressing is faulty and only 500 copies are made available.
  - Swedish musician Stefan Dernbrant leaves punk group Strul, which he had formed with his ex-girlfriend Marie Fredriksson.

== Classical works ==
- Jouni Kaipainen – Cinq poèmes de René Char
- Trygve Madsen – Sonata for Tuba and Piano
- Esa-Pekka Salonen – Concerto for Alto Saxophone and Orchestra (auf den ersten Blick und ohne zu wissen)
- Jukka Tiensuu – Le Tombeau de Beethoven

== Hit singles ==
- ABBA – "The Winner Takes It All" (#1 UK, Ireland, Netherlands, South Africa)
- Bamses Venner – "Tænker altid på dig"
- Gyllene Tider – "När vi två blir en" (#1 Sweden, Norway)
- Kliché – "Aldrig mere / Militskvinder"
- Tomas Ledin – "Just nu!" (#1 Sweden)
- Sverre Kjelsberg & Mattis Hætta – "Sámiid ædnan" (#1 Norway)

== Eurovision Song Contest ==
- Denmark in the Eurovision Song Contest 1980
- Finland in the Eurovision Song Contest 1980
- Norway in the Eurovision Song Contest 1980
- Sweden in the Eurovision Song Contest 1980

== Film and television music ==
- Antti Hytti – Aurinkotuuli
- Morten Kærså – Sådan er Jeg Osse
- Rolf Just Nilsen – Lørdagsredaksjonen
- Arne Olsson – Det blir jul på Möllegården
- Gunner Møller Pedersen – Næste Stop Paradis

== Births ==
- 7 June – Henkka Seppälä, Finnish metal musician
- 28 October – Agnes Obel, Danish singer-songwriter

== Deaths ==
- 13 March – Tauno Pylkkänen, Finnish composer (born 1918)
- 20 June – Allan Pettersson, Danish violist and composer (born 1911)
- 4 August – Pekka Pöyry, Finnish jazz saxophonist and flautist (born 1939)
- 26 October – Bjørn Fongaard, Norwegian composer, guitarist, and teacher (born 1919)
- 10 November – Valdemar Söderholm, Swedish composer (born 1909)
- 22 November – Uffe Baadh, Danish jazz drummer (born 1923)
- 31 December – Irmgard Österwall, Swedish singer (born 1914)

== See also ==
- 1980 in Denmark
- 1980 in Iceland
- 1980 in Norwegian music
- 1980 in Sweden
