= Germany in the Eurovision Song Contest 1980 =

- Eurovision Song Contest 1980
- Participating broadcaster: ARD (Note: Arbeitsgemeinschaft der öffentlich-rechtlichen Rundfunkanstalten der Bundesrepublik Deutschland) – Bayerischer Rundfunk (BR)
- Country: Germany
- Selection process: Ein Lied für Den Haag
- Selection date: 20 March 1980

Competing entry
- Song: "Theater"
- Artist: Katja Ebstein
- Songwriters: Ralph Siegel; Bernd Meinunger

Placement
- Final result: 2nd, 128 points

Participation chronology

Germany was represented at the Eurovision Song Contest 1980 with the song "Theater", composed by Ralph Siegel, with lyrics by Bernd Meinunger, and performed by Katja Ebstein. The German participating broadcaster on behalf of ARD, Bayerischer Rundfunk (BR), selected their entry through a national final. This was Ebstein's third Eurovision appearance; she had previously represented Germany in 1970 and 1971, finishing third on both occasions.

== Before Eurovision ==
=== Ein Lied für Den Haag ===
Bayerischer Rundfunk (BR) held the national final at its television studios in Munich, hosted by Carolin Reiber and Thomas Gottschalk. 12 songs took part and the winner was chosen by a panel of approximately 1,000 people who had been selected as providing a representative cross-section of the German public.

R/O	Artist	Song	Songwriters	Votes	Place
1	Mel Jersey	"Du bist nicht mehr frei"	Walter Gerke; Mick Hannes	3,310	6
2	Costa Cordalis	"Pan"	Ralph Siegel; Kurt Hertha	4,634	2
3	Marianne Rosenberg	"Ich werd' da sein, wenn es Sturm gibt"	Joachim Heider; Horst-Herbert Krause	2,169	12
4	Roland Kaiser	"Hier kriegt jeder sein Fett"	Jürgen Triebel; Horst-Herbert Krause	2,823	8
5	Stefan Waggershausen & Co.	"Verzeih'n Sie, Madame"	Stefan Waggershausen	3,625	4
6	Katja Ebstein	"Theater"	Ralph Siegel; Bernd Meinunger	4,828	1
7	Adam & Eve	"Hallo Adam, Hallo Eva"	Alexander Gordan; Norbert Hammerschmidt	2,847	7
8	Montezuma	"Montezuma Castle"	Rudi Bauer; Gerd Thumser	3,586	5
9	Tony & David	"Minnesänger - Mädchenfänger"	Alexander Gordan; Norbert Hammerschmidt	2,784	9
10	Stefan Hallberg	"Gib uns Zeit"	Jean Frankfurter; Robert Puschmann	2,266	11
11	Susanne Klee	"Wenn du nicht weißt, wohin"	Jean Frankfurter; John Möhring	3,968	3
12	Viel-Harmoniker	"In der Oper"	Gert Wilden; Wolfgang Hofer	2,462	10

== At Eurovision ==
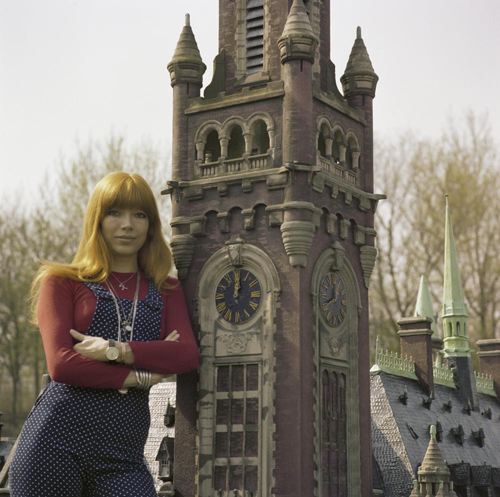
Katja Ebstein at the postcard filming for Eurovision (1980)

On the night of the final Ebstein performed 12th in the running order, following Norway and preceding the United Kingdom. At the close of voting "Theater" had received 128 points, placing Germany second of the 19 entries. Only Greece and Norway failed to award the song any points at all.

The 1980 result gave Ebstein the distinction of being the only Eurovision performer to date to have finished in the top 3 on three occasions.

The German jury was composed of ten members and a jury president with no voting rights. Each jury member gave each song between one and five votes. The total of these points was then converted to the known Eurovision voting format. In case of a draw the placement was decided by a show of hands. The German jury awarded its 12 points to contest winners Ireland.

The show was watched by 17.35 million viewers in Germany, the highest TV rating ever measured in Germany for a Eurovision Song Contest final.

=== Voting ===
Points awarded to Germany
Score	Country
12 points	Italy; Netherlands; Spain
10 points	France; Morocco; Turkey; United Kingdom
8 points	Austria; Portugal
7 points	Belgium; Denmark; Switzerland
6 points	
5 points	Ireland; Sweden
4 points	
3 points	Luxembourg
2 points	Finland
1 point	

Points awarded by Germany
Score	Country
12 points	Ireland
10 points	Switzerland
8 points	Netherlands
7 points	Italy
6 points	Norway
5 points	Denmark
4 points	Austria
3 points	United Kingdom
2 points	Sweden
1 point	Portugal
