= Norway in the Eurovision Song Contest 1980 =

- Eurovision Song Contest 1980
- Participating broadcaster: Norsk rikskringkasting (NRK)
- Country: Norway
- Selection process: Melodi Grand Prix 1980
- Selection date: 22 March 1980

Competing entry
- Song: "Sámiid ædnan"
- Artist: Sverre Kjelsberg and Mattis Hætta
- Songwriters: Sverre Kjelsberg; Ragnar Olsen

Placement
- Final result: 16th, 15 points

Participation chronology

Norway was represented at the Eurovision Song Contest 1980 with the song "Sámiid ædnan", composed by Sverre Kjelsberg, with lyrics by Ragnar Olsen, and performed by Sverre Kjelsberg and Mattis Hætta. The Norwegian participating broadcaster, Norsk rikskringkasting (NRK), selected its entry through the Melodi Grand Prix 1980.

The song’s chorus, consisting of traditional Sami yoik song, was first performed publicly by Mattis Hætta and was broadcast on NRK in October 1979, in connection with the hunger strike song by Sami activists in front of the Norwegian parliament building in connection with the Alta controversy. The verse of the song also refers to this with the line "framførr tinget der dem satt, hørtes joiken dag og natt" (in front of the parliament where they sat, the yoik was heard day and night). Only Kjelsberg was credited as composer of the entry, although Hætta wrote the chorus. The song remains one of the best-remembered Norwegian entries, particularly in Norway itself.

== Before Eurovision ==
=== Melodi Grand Prix 1980 ===
Norsk rikskringkasting (NRK) held the Melodi Grand Prix 1980 at its studios in Oslo, hosted by Åse Kleveland who represented Norway in 1966. The Orchestra was Conducted by Egil Monn-Inversen. Ten songs took part in the final, with the winner chosen by a 9-member jury who awarded 10 points to their favourite song down to 1 point to the least-liked. Voting was very close with only 4 points separating the top five songs. The first vote resulted in a tie for first place, so each jury member was asked to nominate their preferred song of the two, and "Sámiid ædnan" won by 5 votes to 4.

Final – 22 March 1980
R/O	Artist	Song	Points	Place
1	Anita Skorgan	"Stjerneskudd"	48	6
2	Jahn Teigen	"Ja"	32	9
3	Radka Toneff	"Parken"	43	8
4	Åge Aleksandersen and Sambandet	"Bjørnen sover"	61	2
5	Hilde Heltberg	"Maestro"	32	9
6	Henning Sommerro	"Auståvind"	45	7
7	Alex	"Univers"	58	3
8	Nina Askeland	"Rudi"	58	3
9	Inger Lise Rypdal	"Svart fortid"	57	5
10	Sverre Kjelsberg and Mattis Hætta	"Sámiid ædnan"	61	1

Detailed Jury Votes
Draw	Song	Ulf Dalheim	Kari Diesen d.y.	Ivar Dyrhaug	Eli Hennestad Høyland	Rune Larsen	Lillebjørn Nilsen	Kari Stokke	Magni Wentzel	Kjell Winther	Total
1	"Stjerneskudd"	7	3	4	8	7	5	2	7	5	48
2	"Ja"	9	5	3	1	4	1	1	1	7	32
3	"Parken"	1	6	10	4	1	2	6	9	4	43
4	"Bjørnen sover"	8	10	8	5	9	8	3	2	8	61
5	"Maestro"	3	2	2	7	5	3	5	4	1	32
6	"Auståvind"	4	4	5	2	8	4	9	6	3	45
7	"Univers"	10	1	1	9	6	9	4	8	10	58
8	"Rudi"	5	7	6	10	2	6	8	5	9	58
9	"Svart fortid"	2	9	7	6	3	7	7	10	6	57
10	"Sámiid ædnan"	6	8	9	3	10	10	10	3	2	61

Tie-break
Song	Ulf Dalheim	Kari Diesen d.y.	Ivar Dyrhaug	Eli Hennestad Høyland	Rune Larsen	Lillebjørn Nilsen	Kari Stokke	Magni Wentzel	Kjell Winther	Total	Place
"Bjørnen sover"	X	X		X					X	4	2
"Sámiid ædnan"			X		X	X	X	X		5	1

== At Eurovision ==
On the night of the final Kjelsberg and Hætta performed 11th in the running order, following Finland and preceding Germany. At the close of voting "Sámiid ædnan" had received 15 points, placing Norway 16th of the 19 entries. The Norwegian jury awarded its 12 points to contest winners Ireland.

=== Voting ===
Points awarded to Norway
Score	Country
12 points	
10 points	
8 points	
7 points	
6 points	Germany
5 points	
4 points	Morocco
3 points	France
2 points	Netherlands
1 point	

Points awarded by Norway
Score	Country
12 points	Ireland
10 points	Switzerland
8 points	Portugal
7 points	Luxembourg
6 points	Austria
5 points	Finland
4 points	Greece
3 points	France
2 points	Italy
1 point	Denmark
