= France in the Eurovision Song Contest 1980 =

- Eurovision Song Contest 1980
- Participating broadcaster: Télévision Française 1 (TF1)
- Country: France
- Selection process: National final
- Selection date: 23 March 1980

Competing entry
- Song: "Hé, hé m'sieurs dames"
- Artist: Profil
- Songwriters: Sylvano Santorio; Richard de Bordeaux; Richard Joffo

Placement
- Final result: 11th, 45 points

Participation chronology

France was represented at the Eurovision Song Contest 1980 with the song "Hé, hé M'sieurs dames", composed by Sylvano Santorio, with lyrics by Richard de Bordeaux and Richard Joffo, and performed by the band Profil. The French participating broadcaster, Télévision Française 1 (TF1), selected its entry through a national final.

== Before Eurovision ==
=== National final ===
Having chosen their 1979 entry by internal selection, Télévision Française 1 (TF1) returned to a public selection using the same format as in 1976-1978, with two semi-finals followed by the final on 23 March 1980.

==== Semi-finals ====
Each semi-final contained seven songs, with the top three in each going forward to the final. The qualifiers were chosen by public televoting. Other participants included 1969 contest winner Frida Boccara and Minouche Barelli, who had represented Monaco in 1967.

Semi-final 1 – 9 March 1980
R/O	Artist	Song	Votes	Place	Result
1	Jocelyne Jocya	"Si tous les "je t'aime"	1,143	6	—N/a
2	Serge Fouchet	"Le jour de la liberté"	597	7	—N/a
3	Michel Démétriadès	"On a coupé un arbre"	2,056	4	—N/a
4	Bee Michelin	"Une chanson rose"	5,091	2	Qualified
5	Frida Boccara	"Un enfant de France"	4,722	3	Qualified
6	Nadine Douteau	"Ils ont plantés un olivier"	1,441	5	—N/a
7	Marcel Amont	"Camarade vigneron"	5,902	1	Qualified

Semi-final 2 – 16 March 1980
R/O	Artist	Song	Votes	Place	Result
1	Minouche Barelli	"Viens dans ma farandole"	1,705	6	—N/a
2	Chantal Billon	"Un jour, un matin"	6,107	1	Qualified
3	Parasol	"Ni bleu, ni gris"	1,919	5	—N/a
4	Profil	"Hé, hé M'sieurs dames"	6,049	2	Qualified
5	Simone Langlois	"Dans le regard d'un enfant"	3,094	4	—N/a
6	Bernard Sauvat	"J'suis heureux"	1,493	7	—N/a
7	Anne Delorme	"Poète ou musicien"	5,803	3	Qualified

==== Final ====
The final took place on 23 March 1980, hosted by Évelyne Dhéliat. The winner was chosen by public televoting.

Final – 23 March 1980
R/O	Artist	Song	Televote	Place
1	Bee Michelin	"Une chanson rose"	4,071	6
2	Chantal Billon	"Un jour, un matin"	8,263	2
3	Anne Delorme	"Poète ou musicien"	7,324	3
4	Profil	"Hé, hé M'sieurs dames"	10,628	1
5	Marcel Amont	Camarade vigneron	7,182	4
6	Frida Boccara	"Un enfant de France"	7,144	5

== At Eurovision ==
On the night of the final Profil performed 16th in the running order, following the Netherlands and preceding eventual contest winners Ireland. At the close of voting "Hé, hé M'sieurs dames" had picked up 45 points, placing France 11th of the 19 entries and bringing to an end a run of four consecutive top 3 finishes. The French jury awarded its 12 points to the Netherlands.

=== Voting ===
Points awarded to France
Score	Country
12 points	
10 points	
8 points	
7 points	Greece
6 points	Spain
5 points	Belgium; United Kingdom
4 points	Netherlands; Sweden
3 points	Ireland; Norway; Turkey
2 points	Luxembourg
1 point	Denmark; Morocco; Switzerland

Points awarded by France
Score	Country
12 points	Netherlands
10 points	Germany
8 points	Ireland
7 points	Luxembourg
6 points	Portugal
5 points	United Kingdom
4 points	Austria
3 points	Norway
2 points	Italy
1 point	Finland
