= Sámiid ædnan =

1980 song by Sverre Kjelsberg and Mattis Hætta

Single by Sverre Kjelsberg and Mattis Hætta
- Language: Norwegian
- Released: 1984
- Composers: Sverre Kjelsberg; Mattis Hætta
- Lyricist: Ragnar Olsen

Eurovision Song Contest 1980 entry
- Country: Norway
- Artists: Sverre Kjelsberg and Mattis Hætta
- Language: Norwegian
- Composers: Sverre Kjelsberg; Mattis Hætta
- Lyricist: Ragnar Olsen
- Conductor: Sigurd Jansen

Finals performance
- Final result: 16th
- Final points: 15

Entry chronology
- ◄ "Oliver" (1979)
- "Aldri i livet" (1981) ►

"Sámiid ædnan" (Norwegian: "Sameland"; English: "Sami Land"; describing the motherland of Sápmi) is a song performed by Sverre Kjelsberg and Mattis Hætta. It represented Norway in the Eurovision Song Contest 1980 after winning the Melodi Grand Prix 1980. The words of the song were performed in Norwegian by Sverre Kjelsberg, while Mattis Hætta contributed with the yoik chorus – a Sami form of vocal music without words; the title of the song is however in the Northern Sami language, translating as "Sami Land" or "Sami Soil". There are no actual Sami words in the yoik chorus – instead, the syllables "lo" and "la" are simply repeated, giving rise to another popular title for the song, "Låla".

The song is about environmental protection and indigenous rights.

== Conception ==
The song was inspired by the autonomy movement among the Sami people of northern Norway, with the duo singing that the demand for autonomy was made in a very subdued manner. Mention is also made of the traditional music of the region, the yoik, which is described as being "stronger than gunpowder" in the lyrics. The line framførr tinget der dem satt, hørtes joiken dag og natt ("in front of the parliament where they sat, the yoik was heard day and night"), refers to a hunger strike by Sami activists in front of the Norwegian parliament building in October 1979 in connection with the Alta controversy, where Mattis Hætta first performed the yoik that constituted the song's chorus. The song was thus performed the year before the contest. It describes the Sami world as coming like a "puff of wind from the north", before it turned into a "storm". The final lyrics of the song claim that "the yoik is more powerful than gunpowder...because the yoik never ends."

== Performance in the Eurovision Song Contest ==
The song was performed eleventh on the night, following Finland's Vesa-Matti Loiri with "Huilumies" and preceding Germany's Katja Ebstein with "Theater". At the close of voting, it had received 15 points, placing 16th in a field of 19.

== Influence ==
This song was among the first instance of Sami influence on the wider culture of Europe. An excerpt from the song is sung by the Norwegian characters in the movie prequel The Thing.

== Charts ==
Chart (1980)	Peak position
Norway (VG-lista)	1

== See also ==
- "Spirit in the Sky" by Keiino – another song containing joik representing Norway at the Eurovision Song Contest 2019
