= Spain in the Eurovision Song Contest 1980 =

- Eurovision Song Contest 1980
- Participating broadcaster: Televisión Española (TVE)
- Country: Spain
- Selection process: Internal selection
- Announcement date: Artist: 22 January 1980; Song: 22 March 1980

Competing entry
- Song: "Quédate esta noche"
- Artist: Trigo Limpio
- Songwriter: José Antonio Martín

Placement
- Final result: 12th, 38 points

Participation chronology

Spain was represented at the Eurovision Song Contest 1980 with the song "Quédate esta noche", written by José Antonio Martín, and performed by Trigo Limpio. The Spanish participating broadcaster, Televisión Española (TVE), internally selected its entry for the contest. The song, performed in position 18, placed twelfth out of nineteen competing entries with 38 points.

== Before Eurovision ==
Televisión Española (TVE) assembled a jury of 25 members composed of television and music critics, media reporters, and representatives of the network who, locked up on 22 January 1980, internally selected among 15 candidate songs "Quédate esta noche" performed by Trigo Limpio as its entry for the Eurovision Song Contest 1980. The song was written by José Antonio Martín. The title of the song, the songwriter, and the performers were announced that same day. The members of the group were Iñaki de Pablo, Luis Carlos Gil, and Patricia Fernández. The song was presented on 22 March. They also recorded the song in French as "Viens rêver".

== At Eurovision ==
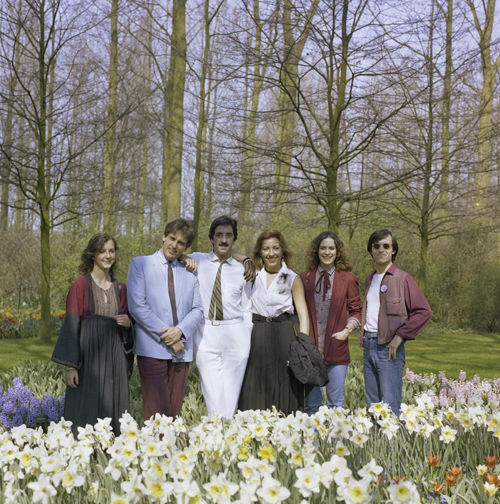
Trigo Limpio and their backing singers at the shooting for the Eurovision postcard.

On 19 April 1980, the Eurovision Song Contest was held at the Nederlands Congresgebouw in The Hague hosted by Nederlandse Omroep Stichting (NOS), and broadcast live throughout the continent. Trigo Limpio performed "Quédate esta noche" 18th on the evening, following Ireland (the eventual winner) and preceding Belgium. The members of the group were dressed for the occasion by Jesús del Pozo. Javier Iturralde conducted the event's orchestra performance of the Spanish entry; which was presented on stage by Mari Cruz Soriano. At the close of voting "Quédate esta noche" had received 38 points, placing 12th in a field of 19.

TVE broadcast the contest in Spain on TVE 1 with commentary by Miguel de los Santos. Before the event, TVE aired a talk show hosted by Marisa Medina introducing the Spanish jury, which continued after the contest commenting on the results.

=== Voting ===
Points awarded to Spain
Score	Country
12 points	
10 points	
8 points	Greece
7 points	Turkey
6 points	Italy; Luxembourg
5 points	Morocco
4 points	Austria
3 points	
2 points	Portugal
1 point	

Points awarded by Spain
Score	Country
12 points	Germany
10 points	Italy
8 points	United Kingdom
7 points	Ireland
6 points	France
5 points	Netherlands
4 points	Austria
3 points	Luxembourg
2 points	Switzerland
1 point	Sweden
