= Belgium in the Eurovision Song Contest 1980 =

- Eurovision Song Contest 1980
- Participating broadcaster: Radio-télévision belge de la Communauté française (RTBF)
- Country: Belgium
- Selection process: Eliminatoires Belges du Grand Prix de la Chanson Européenne
- Selection date: 24 February 1980

Competing entry
- Song: "Euro-Vision"
- Artist: Telex
- Songwriters: Michel Moers; Dan Lacksman; Marc Moulin

Placement
- Final result: 17th, 14 points

Participation chronology

Belgium was represented at the Eurovision Song Contest 1980 with the song "Euro-Vision", written by Michel Moers, Dan Lacksman, and Marc Moulin, and performed by themselves under their stage name Telex. The Belgian participating broadcaster, Walloon Radio-télévision belge de la Communauté française (RTBF), selected its entry through a national final.

== Before Eurovision ==
=== Eliminatoires Belges du Grand Prix de la Chanson Européenne ===
Walloon broadcaster Radio-télévision belge de la Communauté française (RTBF) had the turn to participate in the Eurovision Song Contest 1980 representing Belgium. The final took place on 24 February 1980 and was hosted by former Belgian Eurovision entrant Jean Vallée. Each song was presented as a pre-recorded video from the RTBF studios. The show was broadcast at 19:55 CET until 20:35 CET, after which a jury deliberated for 2 hours and at 22:35 CET a five minute show was broadcast with the announcement of the winning song, but no other results were revealed.

Final – 24 February 1980
R/O	Artist	Song	Songwriter(s)	Place
1	Bruno Brel	"Être heureux, rien qu'une heure"	Bruno Brel	—N/a
2	Domani	"Tu es toute ma vie"	Luigi Verderame; Nelly Byl	—N/a
3	Lou and The Hollywood Bananas	"Et puis, et puis... rien"	Lou Deprijck; Jay Alanski	—N/a
4	Kevin Morane	"Ivre de vie"	Kevin Morane	—N/a
5	Sonia	"La star maniaque"	Michel Croiseau; Eliane Pamart; Roquery	—N/a
6	Telex	"Euro-Vision"	Dan Lacksman; Michel Moers; Marc Moulin	1
7	Timothy	"Parle-moi, grand-père"	Timothy Hagelstein; Collins	—N/a

== At Eurovision ==
On the night of the final Telex performed last in the running order, following Spain. At the close of the voting "Euro-Vision" had received 14 points, placing Belgium 17th of the 19 entries. Singer Marc Moulin later claimed that the band had hoped to finish last and blamed the Portuguese jury for thwarthing their aims, although how much of this was bravado after a bad result in the contest is open to conjecture. The Belgian jury awarded its 12 points to contest winners Ireland.

=== Voting ===
Points awarded to Belgium
Score	Country
12 points	
10 points	Portugal
8 points	
7 points	
6 points	
5 points	
4 points	
3 points	Greece
2 points	
1 point	United Kingdom

Points awarded by Belgium
Score	Country
12 points	Ireland
10 points	Italy
8 points	Luxembourg
7 points	Germany
6 points	United Kingdom
5 points	France
4 points	Portugal
3 points	Netherlands
2 points	Switzerland
1 point	Austria
