= United Kingdom in the Eurovision Song Contest 1980 =

- Eurovision Song Contest 1980
- Participating broadcaster: British Broadcasting Corporation (BBC)
- Country: United Kingdom
- Selection process: A Song for Europe 1980
- Selection date: 26 March 1980

Competing entry
- Song: "Love Enough for Two"
- Artist: Prima Donna
- Songwriters: Stephanie de Sykes; Stuart Slater

Placement
- Final result: 3rd, 106 points

Participation chronology

The United Kingdom was represented at the Eurovision Song Contest 1980 with the song "Love Enough for Two", written by Stephanie de Sykes and Stuart Slater, and performed by the group Prima Donna. The British participating broadcaster, the British Broadcasting Corporation (BBC), selected its entry through a national final.

== Before Eurovision ==
=== A Song for Europe 1980 ===
A Song for Europe 1980 was held on 26 March 1980 at the BBC Television Theatre in London and was hosted by Terry Wogan. The BBC Concert Orchestra under the direction of John Coleman as conductor accompanied all the songs, but all the music was pre-recorded. 12 songs were chosen by the Music Publisher's Association.

Following his second place in the 1979 contest, songwriter Richard Gillinson was asked to submit a song to replace the disqualified entry "Tell Me" by the New Seekers, which was eliminated two weeks before the final after the group began promoting the track before the contest. Gillinson's song "Surrender" was performed by the same artist who presented his 1979 song, Kim Clark. The lead vocal of "Tell Me" was taken by New Seeker Nicola Kerr, who had been one of the 'Plus Two' who had finished 3rd for Ireland in 1977.

The twelve songs were voted on by 14 regional juries, who awarded 1-12 points to each song. Each of the 11 jurors awarded 1-5 points to each song, the total scores being added up, with the song earning the most points being awarded 12 points, the second placed song earned 11, the third 10 and so on, down to 1 point for the song with the fewest votes.

The jury spokesperson could be seen on screen awarding the votes, sometimes with the jury members in vision. These were broadcast from the BBC's 14 regional news studios.

Owing to a tie break and with the live show quickly running out of time, a clearly flustered Terry Wogan, unsure of what to do in this unprecedented circumstance, returned to the 14 juries who were hastily asked to pick their favourite between songs two and five.

A Song for Europe 1980 – 26 March 1980
R/O	Artist	Song	Songwriter(s)	Points	Place
1	Scramble	"Don't Throw Your Love Away"	Peter Morris	97	6
2	Maggie Moone	"Happy Everything"	Geoff Stephens; Don Black	131	2
3	Plain Sailing	"Easy"	Colin Stewart; Alan Stewart; Paul Stewart; Robert Freeman	111	4
4	Sonja Jones	"Here We'll Stay"	Tony Colton; Jean Roussell	56	11
5	Prima Donna	"Love Enough for Two"	Stephanie de Sykes; Stuart Slater	131	1
6	Jacqui Scott	"Symphony for You"	Johnny Goodison; Keith Mansfield	67	8
7	Duke and the Aces	"Love Is Alive"	Paul Curtis	94	7
8	Roy Winston	"Everything's All Right"	Roy Winston	58	10
9	Midnite	"Love Comes, Love Grows"	Gary Sulsh; Stuart Leathwood	62	9
10	The Main Event	"Gonna Do My Best"	Terry Bradford	45	12
11	Pussyfoot	"I Want to Be Me"	Mick Flinn; Mark Stevens	111	4
12	Kim Clark	"Surrender"	Richard Gillinson	129	3

Tie-Break
Artist	Song	Songwriter(s)	Points	Place
Maggie Moone	"Happy Everything"	Geoff Stephens; Don Black	6	2
Prima Donna	"Love Enough for Two"	Stephanie de Sykes; Stuart Slater	8	1

Regional jury votes
R/O	Song	Aberdeen	Newcastle	Plymouth	Leeds	Southampton	Bangor	London	Cardiff	Birmingham	Glasgow	Belfast	Bristol	Norwich	Manchester	Total
1	"Don't Throw Your Love Away"	10	7	5	8	3	6	5	9	10	10	9	5	7	3	97
2	"Happy Everything"	11	8	8	11	8	10	10	12	12	6	10	12	8	5	131
3	"Easy"	6	5	12	10	12	9	8	7	5	5	6	9	6	11	111
4	"Here We'll Stay"	1	2	1	2	4	2	4	10	3	2	8	8	5	4	56
5	"Love Enough for Two"	8	12	9	12	9	12	12	11	8	8	7	6	11	6	131
6	"Symphony for You"	5	10	10	1	2	7	11	8	4	4	1	2	1	1	67
7	"Love Is Alive"	7	11	11	7	6	5	6	2	9	7	3	3	10	7	94
8	"Everything's All Right"	2	6	6	3	1	4	2	4	2	3	5	10	2	8	58
9	"Love Comes, Love Grows"	4	3	2	4	7	8	1	3	7	9	4	4	4	2	62
10	"Gonna Do My Best"	3	4	3	6	5	3	3	1	1	1	2	1	3	9	45
11	"I Want to Be Me"	9	1	7	5	11	1	7	6	6	11	12	11	12	12	111
12	"Surrender"	12	9	4	9	10	11	9	5	11	12	11	7	9	10	129
Tie-Break
	"Happy Everything"	X			X					X	X	X	X			6
	"Love Enough for Two"		X	X		X	X	X	X					X	X	8
Regional jury spokespersons
Aberdeen – Gerry Davis; Newcastle – Mike Neville; Plymouth – Donald Heighway; Leeds – Brian Baines; Southampton – Peter Macann; Bangor – Alun Evans; London – Colin Berry; Cardiff – Iwan Thomas; Birmingham – David Stevens; Glasgow – Douglas Brock; Belfast – Mike Baguley; Bristol – Derek Jones; Norwich – Gill Hewitt; Manchester – John Mundy

== At Eurovision ==
At the Eurovision itself, "Love Enough for Two" scored 106 points and was positioned third overall. The event took place in the Hague in the Netherlands and was won by Ireland's "What's Another Year?" by Johnny Logan.

Terry Wogan provided the BBC television commentary, whilst Steve Jones provided the BBC Radio 2 commentary. Regular Eurovision radio commentator Ray Moore served as spokesperson for the UK jury. This was the start for Wogan's continuous television commentary which he would do every year until 2008.

=== Voting ===
Points awarded to the United Kingdom
Score	Country
12 points	Sweden
10 points	Denmark; Switzerland
8 points	Luxembourg; Morocco; Spain
7 points	Austria; Netherlands; Portugal
6 points	Belgium; Ireland
5 points	France; Turkey
4 points	Finland
3 points	Germany
2 points	
1 point	

Points awarded by the United Kingdom
Score	Country
12 points	Ireland
10 points	Germany
8 points	Luxembourg
7 points	Switzerland
6 points	Austria
5 points	France
4 points	Italy
3 points	Greece
2 points	Netherlands
1 point	Belgium
