= Ireland in the Eurovision Song Contest 1980 =

- Eurovision Song Contest 1980
- Participating broadcaster: Radio Telefís Éireann (RTÉ)
- Country: Ireland
- Selection process: National Song Contest
- Selection date: 9 March 1980

Competing entry
- Song: "What's Another Year"
- Artist: Johnny Logan
- Songwriter: Shay Healy

Placement
- Final result: 1st, 143 points

Participation chronology

Ireland was represented at the Eurovision Song Contest 1980 with the song "What's Another Year", written by Shay Healy, and performed by Johnny Logan. The Irish participating broadcaster, Radio Telefís Éireann (RTÉ), selected its entry through a national final. The entry eventually won the Eurovision Song Contest.

== Before Eurovision ==
=== National final ===
Radio Telefís Éireann (RTÉ) held the sixteenth edition of the National Song Contest on 9 March 1980 at its studios in Dublin, hosted by Larry Gogan. Eight songs were performed live to the Irish viewers and listeners, with the winning song being decided by 10 regional juries across the country.

R/O	Artist	Song	Points	Place
1	Roy Taylor and Karen Black	"Lovin' Won't Let You Down"	13	3
2	The Straw Hat and Garter Company	"Take Me Back Again"	2	8
3	Eileen Reid	"The Saddest Show on Earth"	10	4
4	Charlie Chapman and The Miami	"You're So Cheeky"	5	5
5	Johnny Logan	"What's Another Year"	40	1
6	The Dajacs	"You Have"	4	7
7	Peter Beckett	"Stepping Stones"	21	2
8	Romance	"Love Is All There Is"	5	5

Detailed Regional Jury Votes
R/O	Song	Longford	Kenmare	Claremorris	Cork	Sligo	Wexford	Donegal	Limerick	Dublin	Thurles	Total
1	"Lovin' Won't Let You Down"	1	1	2				1	5		3	13
2	"Take Me Back Again"								1		1	2
3	"The Saddest Show on Earth"	2		2				3	1		2	10
4	"You're So Cheeky"				2	3						5
5	"What's Another Year"	2	3	1	8	6	10	4	1	3	2	40
6	"You Have"			1					2	1		4
7	"Stepping Stones"	5	5	4				2		5		21
8	"Love Is All There Is"		1			1				1	2	5

== At Eurovision ==
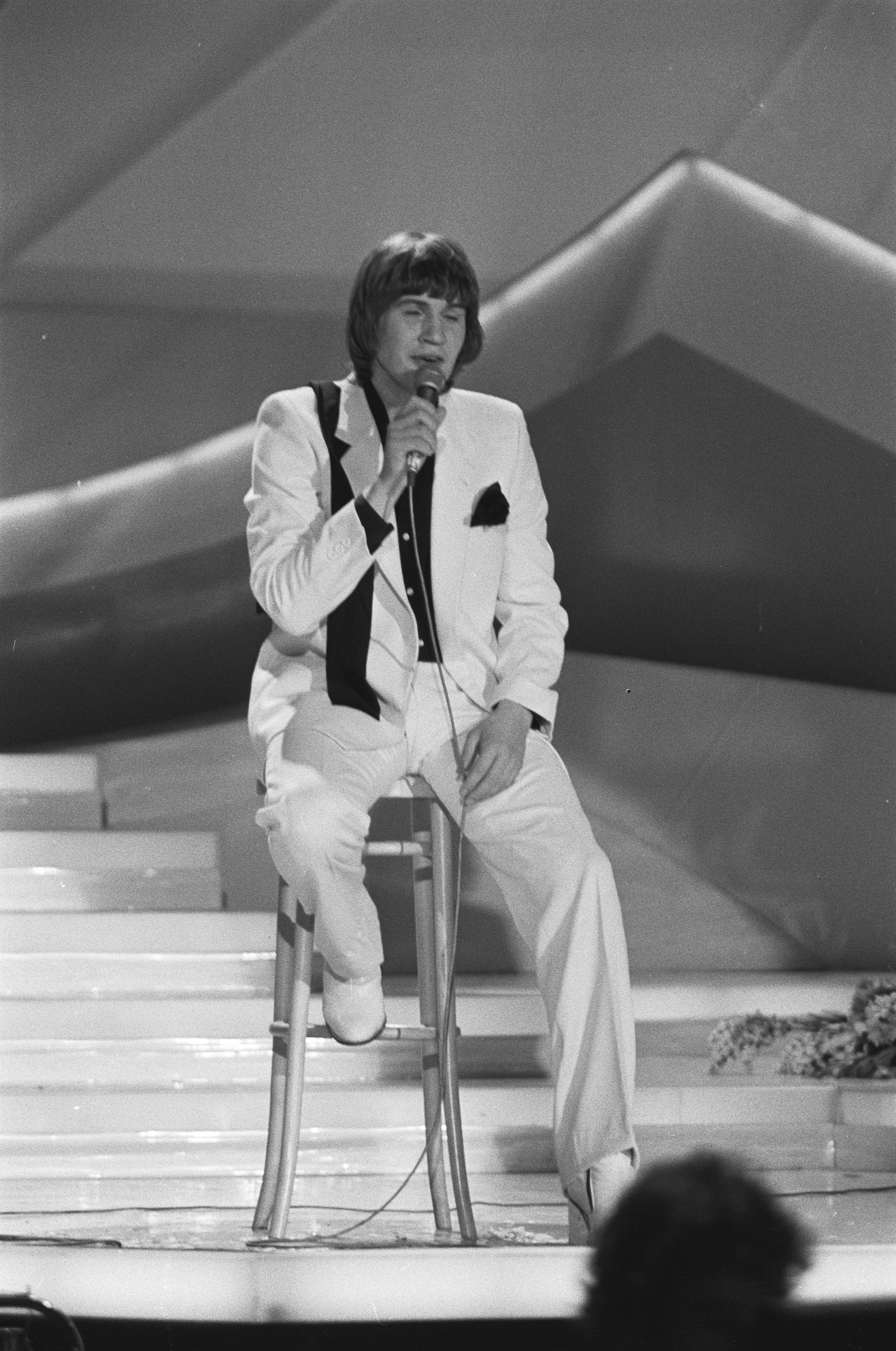
Johnny Logan at the Eurovision Song Contest 1980

The Eurovision Song Contest 1980 was held at the Congresgebouw in the Hague, Netherlands. Ireland performed 17th on the night of the contest, following France and preceding Spain. Logan received 143 points for his performance, winning the contest for Ireland. This was Ireland's second victory, ten years after its first in 1970.

=== Voting ===
Points awarded to Ireland
Score	Country
12 points	Belgium; Denmark; Germany; Greece; Norway; Switzerland; United Kingdom
10 points	Austria
8 points	Finland; France
7 points	Luxembourg; Spain; Sweden
6 points	Netherlands
5 points	Portugal
4 points	
3 points	
2 points	
1 point	Italy

Points awarded by Ireland
Score	Country
12 points	Switzerland
10 points	Austria
8 points	Luxembourg
7 points	Portugal
6 points	United Kingdom
5 points	Germany
4 points	Greece
3 points	France
2 points	Italy
1 point	Netherlands

== Congratulations: 50 Years of the Eurovision Song Contest ==
Among "What's Another Year"'s future honours as a Eurovision evergreen was its inclusion as one of the fourteen competing songs in Congratulations, Eurovision's fiftieth anniversary contest special. It was one of two Irish entries competing to be named the best Eurovision entry of all time, the other being Logan's subsequent winner, "Hold Me Now". The song was performed second on the night, following the United Kingdom's Cliff Richard with "Congratulations" and preceding Israel's Dana International with "Diva." Unlike "Hold Me Now," "What's Another Year" failed to make it past the first round, finishing 12th with 74 points.

=== Voting ===
Points awarded to "What's Another Year" (Round 1)
Score	Country
12 points	
10 points	
8 points	Ireland
7 points	
6 points	Cyprus; Greece; Netherlands; Norway; Romania
5 points	Denmark
4 points	Belgium; Finland; Portugal; Turkey
3 points	Lithuania; Macedonia; Monaco
2 points	Andorra; Malta
1 point	Germany; Switzerland
