= Greece in the Eurovision Song Contest 1980 =

- Eurovision Song Contest 1980
- Participating broadcaster: Hellenic Broadcasting Corporation (ERT)
- Country: Greece
- Selection process: National final
- Selection date: 10 March 1980

Competing entry
- Song: "Autostop"
- Artist: Anna Vissi and the Epikouri
- Songwriters: Jick Nacassian; Rony Sofu

Placement
- Final result: 13th, 30 points

Participation chronology

Greece was represented at the Eurovision Song Contest 1980 with the song "Autostop", composed by Jick Nacassian, with lyrics by Rony Sofu, and performed by Anna Vissi and The Epikouri. The Greek participating broadcaster, the Hellenic Broadcasting Corporation (ERT), held a national final to select its entry.

Greece performed third at the event, held on 19 April 1980, in the Hague, Netherlands, and placed 13th with 30 points. This tied the nation's lowest placement in the contest.

== Background ==
Prior to the 1980 contest, Ethniko Idryma Radiofonias Tileoraseos (EIRT) in 1974, and the Hellenic Broadcasting Corporation (ERT) since 1975, had participated in the Eurovision Song Contest representing Greece five times. To this point, their best result was fifth place, which was achieved in 1977 with the song "Mathima solfege". Their least successful result was in 1976, when it placed 13th with the song "Panagia mou, Panagia mou" by Mariza Koch.

== Before Eurovision ==
=== National final ===
ERT held the national final on 10 March 1980, at its television studios in Peania, hosted by Vasilis Tsivilikas. The winning song was chosen by a jury of people who awarded each song a mark out of ten.

Final – 10 March 1980
R/O	Artist	Song	Points	Place
1	Yiannis Floriniotis	"Mono mia melodia" (Μόνο μια μελωδία)	260	10
2	Dakis & Rena Panta	"Mono esi" (Μόνο εσύ)	289	9
3	Anna Vissi	"Autostop" (Ωτοστόπ)	474	1
4	Antonis Stefanides	"Min argeis" (Μην αργείς)	202	12
5	Dakis	"Pare ena kohili ap'to Aegaeo" (Πάρε ένα κοχύλι απ'το Αιγαιο)	410	3
6	Milli Karali	"Tiki-tak" (Τικι-τακ)	361	6
7	Glykeria	"Etsi apla s'agapo" (Έτσι απλά σ'αγαπώ)	364	5
8	Kostas Tournas & The Epikouri	"UFO"	469	2
9	Yiorgos Polychroniadis	"Thymisou me" (Θυμησου με)	327	8
10	Group Anonymous	"Sto rythmo ton UFO" (Στο ρυθμό των UFO)	368	4
11	Sigma Fei	"Na les s'agapo" (Να λες σ'αγαπώ)	225	11
12	Takis Antoniades	"Ti thes na po" (Τη θες να πω)	347	7

== At Eurovision ==
The Eurovision Song Contest 1980 was held on 19 April 1980, at the Nederlands Congresgebouw in the Hague, Netherlands. "Autostop" was the third performed that night (following Turkey's "Pet'r Oil" by Ajda Pekkan and preceding Luxembourg's "Papa Pingouin" by Sophie and Magaly). At the close of voting, it had received 30 points, placing 13th in a field of 19.

=== Voting ===
Points awarded to Greece
Score	Country
12 points	
10 points	
8 points	Netherlands
7 points	
6 points	
5 points	Austria
4 points	Ireland; Norway
3 points	United Kingdom
2 points	Denmark; Italy
1 point	Luxembourg; Portugal

Points awarded by Greece
Score	Country
12 points	Ireland
10 points	Sweden
8 points	Spain
7 points	France
6 points	Netherlands
5 points	Portugal
4 points	Denmark
3 points	Belgium
2 points	Italy
1 point	Austria
