= Turkey in the Eurovision Song Contest 1980 =

- Eurovision Song Contest 1980
- Participating broadcaster: Turkish Radio and Television Corporation (TRT)
- Country: Turkey
- Selection process: Artist: Internal selection Song: 4. Eurovision Şarkı Yarışması Türkiye Finalil
- Selection date: 24 February 1980

Competing entry
- Song: "Pet'r Oil"
- Artist: Ajda Pekkan
- Songwriters: Attila Özdemiroğlu; Şanar Yurdatapan

Placement
- Final result: 15th, 23 points

Participation chronology

Turkey was represented at the Eurovision Song Contest 1980 with the song "Pet'r Oil", composed by Attila Özdemiroğlu, with lyrics by Şanar Yurdatapan, and performed by Ajda Pekkan. The Turkish participating broadcaster, the Turkish Radio and Television Corporation (TRT), selected its entry through a national final, after having previously selected the performer internally.

== Before Eurovision ==
=== 4. Eurovision Şarkı Yarışması Türkiye Finali ===
The Turkish Radio and Television Corporation (TRT) held the national final on 24 February 1980 at its studios in Ankara, hosted by Bülend Özveren. All songs were performed by Ajda Pekkan and the winning song was determined by an expert jury in two rounds. In the first round, the lowest-scoring song was eliminated. In the second round, "Pet'r Oil" was selected as the winning song.

First Round – 24 February 1980
R/O	Song	Lyricist	Composer	Points	Place	Result
1	"Olsam"	Adnan Yumuk	Şerif Yüzbaşıoğlu	9	2	Advanced
2	"Pet'r Oil"	Şanar Yurdatapan	Attila Özdemiroğlu	11	1	Advanced
3	"Bir Dünya Ver Bana"	Fikret Şeneş	Cenk Taşkan	2	3	—N/a

Second Round
R/O	Song	Points	Place
1	"Olsam"	10	2
2	"Pet'r Oil"	12	1

== At Eurovision ==
The contest was broadcast on TRT Televizyon (with commentary by Bülend Özveren), and on radio station Radyo 3 (with commentary by Şebnem Savaşçı).

On the night of the contest Pekkan performed second in the running order following Austria and preceding Greece. At the close of the voting the song received 23 points, placing 15th in a field of 19 countries. The Turkish jury awarded its 12 points to the Netherlands.

=== Voting ===
Points awarded to Turkey
Score	Country
12 points	Morocco
10 points	
8 points	Italy
7 points	
6 points	
5 points	
4 points	
3 points	Austria
2 points	
1 point	

Points awarded by Turkey
Score	Country
12 points	Netherlands
10 points	Germany
8 points	Sweden
7 points	Spain
6 points	Italy
5 points	United Kingdom
4 points	Portugal
3 points	France
2 points	Switzerland
1 point	Luxembourg
