= Finland in the Eurovision Song Contest 1980 =

- Eurovision Song Contest 1980
- Participating broadcaster: Yleisradio (Yle)
- Country: Finland
- Selection process: National final
- Selection date: 8 March 1980

Competing entry
- Song: "Huilumies"
- Artist: Vesa-Matti Loiri
- Songwriters: Aarno Raninen; Vexi Salmi

Placement
- Final result: 19th, 6 points

Participation chronology

Finland was represented at the Eurovision Song Contest 1980 with the song "Huilumies", composed by Aarno Raninen, with lyrics by Vexi Salmi, and performed by Vesa-Matti Loiri. The Finnish participating broadcaster, Yleisradio (Yle), selected its entry through a national final.

== Before Eurovision ==
Yleisradio (Yle) invited twelve composers for the competition. One of them, Sami Hurmerinta, declined the invitation. The Finnish national selection consisted of a semi final and a final.

=== Semi-final ===
The semi-final was held on 12 January 1980, and it was hosted by Heikki Harma. From the eleven entries the six finalists were chosen by an expert jury. The members of the jury were Aarre Elo, Jussi Raittinen, Matti Rosvall, Erkki Pälli, Rauno Lehtinen, Liisa Lääveri, Erkki Melakoski, Kari Kyrönseppä, and Markku Fagerlund. Each juror awarded 1 to 6 points for each song. The full results were not revealed.

Semi-final – 12 January 1980
R/O	Artist	Song	Songwriter(s)	Result
1	Paula Koivuniemi	"Romantiikkaa"	Markku Johansson; Juha Vainio	—N/a
2	Tapani Kansa and Satu Pentikäinen	"Hyvä on"	Jukka Siikavire; Erkki Mäkinen	—N/a
3	Kisu	"Oh la la"	Kassu Halonen; Raul Reiman	—N/a
4	Kirka and Silhuetit	"Karthago"	Antti Hyvärinen; Juice Leskinen	Qualified
5	Vesa-Matti Loiri	"Huilumies"	Aarno Raninen; Vexi Salmi	Qualified
6	Sinikka Sokka	"Eräs lapsi ei nuku"	Henrik Otto Donner; Pentti Saaritsa	Qualified
7	Tapani Kansa	"Kun ystävän mä sain"	Lasse Mirsch	—N/a
8	Eija Ahvo	"Lady Day"	Jukka Linkola; Arto Melleri	Qualified
9	Irina Milan	"Päättymätön laulu"	Olli Ahvenlahti; Jukka Virtanen	Qualified
10	Liisa Tavi and Band	"Nopea talven valo"	Pekka Tegelman; Jukka-Pekka Takala	Qualified
11	Reijo Karvonen and Pepe Willberg	"Jos voimaa on"	Reijo Karvonen; Matti Härkälä	—N/a

=== Final ===
Yle held the final on 8 March 1980 at its television studios in Tampere, hosted by Mikko Alatalo. After the Eurovision Preselection, this was proceeded by the Intervision preselection, where all six songs were sung by Marion. The winner was chosen by regional juries. Each jury group consisted of 15 members, and each juror distributed their points between 1–6 points for each song.

Final – 8 March 1980
R/O	Artist	Song	Points	Place
1	Vesa-Matti Loiri	"Huilumies"	386	1
2	Liisa Tavi and Band	"Nopea talven valo"	190	6
3	Kirka and Silhuetit	"Karthago"	315	2
4	Eija Ahvo	"Lady Day"	210	5
5	Irina Milan	"Päättymätön laulu"	240	3
6	Sinikka Sokka	"Eräs lapsi ei nuku"	234	4

Scoreboard
R/O	Song	Turku	Oulu	Helsinki	Tampere	Lappeenranta	Total
1	"Huilumies"	75	75	78	85	73	386
2	"Nopea talven valo"	38	41	39	34	38	190
3	"Karthago"	66	64	59	67	59	315
4	"Lady Day"	39	42	46	37	46	210
5	"Päättymätön laulu"	47	31	51	53	58	240
6	"Eräs lapsi ei nuku"	50	62	42	39	41	234

== At Eurovision ==
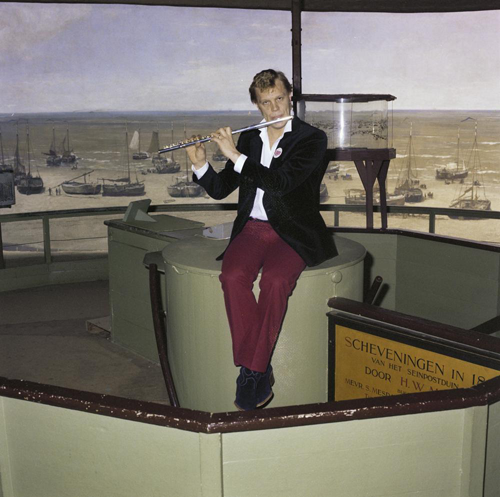
Vesa-Matti Loiri (1980)

On the night of the final Loiri performed 10th in the running order following Switzerland and preceding Norway. Loiri was accompanied by Arto Alaspää, Kalle Fält, Maarit Hurmerinta, Martti Metsäketo and Irina Milan as backing vocalists. The Finnish entry was conducted by Ossi Runne. Finland placed last in the contest with six points.

=== Voting ===
Points awarded to Finland
Score	Country
12 points	
10 points	
8 points	
7 points	
6 points	
5 points	Norway
4 points	
3 points	
2 points	
1 point	France

Points awarded by Finland
Score	Country
12 points	Switzerland
10 points	Netherlands
8 points	Ireland
7 points	Denmark
6 points	Italy
5 points	Austria
4 points	United Kingdom
3 points	Luxembourg
2 points	Germany
1 point	Portugal
