= Eurovision Song Contest 1980 =

International song competition

Date and venue
- Final: 19 April 1980
- Venue: Nederlands Congresgebouw; The Hague, Netherlands

Organisation
- Organiser: European Broadcasting Union (EBU)
- Scrutineer: Frank Naef

Production
- Host broadcaster: Nederlandse Omroep Stichting (NOS)
- Director: Theo Ordeman
- Executive producer: Fred Oster
- Musical director: Rogier van Otterloo
- Presenter: Marlous Fluitsma

Participants
- Number of entries: 19
- Debuting countries: Morocco
- Returning countries: Turkey
- Non-returning countries: Israel; Monaco
- Participation map: Competing countries Countries that participated in the past but not in 1980

Vote
- Voting system: Each country awarded 12, 10, 8–1 point(s) to their 10 favourite songs
- Winning song: Ireland "What's Another Year"

The Eurovision Song Contest 1980 was the 25th edition of the Eurovision Song Contest, held on 19 April 1980 at the Nederlands Congresgebouw in The Hague, Netherlands, and presented by Marlous Fluitsma. It was organised by the European Broadcasting Union (EBU) and host broadcaster Nederlandse Omroep Stichting (NOS), who staged the event after the Israel Broadcasting Authority (IBA), which had won the 1979 contest for Israel, declined hosting responsibilities due to financial constraints. Although Fluitsma was the main presenter, each song was introduced by a presenter appointed by each participating broadcaster.

Broadcasters from nineteen countries took part this year, with Monaco and the previous year's winner Israel deciding not to participate, and Turkey returning. Morocco made its only appearance in the contest. It was the last Eurovision Song Contest not to be hosted in the previous edition's winning country for 43 years (the next time this would occur would be in 2023).

The winner was Ireland with the song "What's Another Year", sung by Johnny Logan and written by Shay Healy.

== Location ==
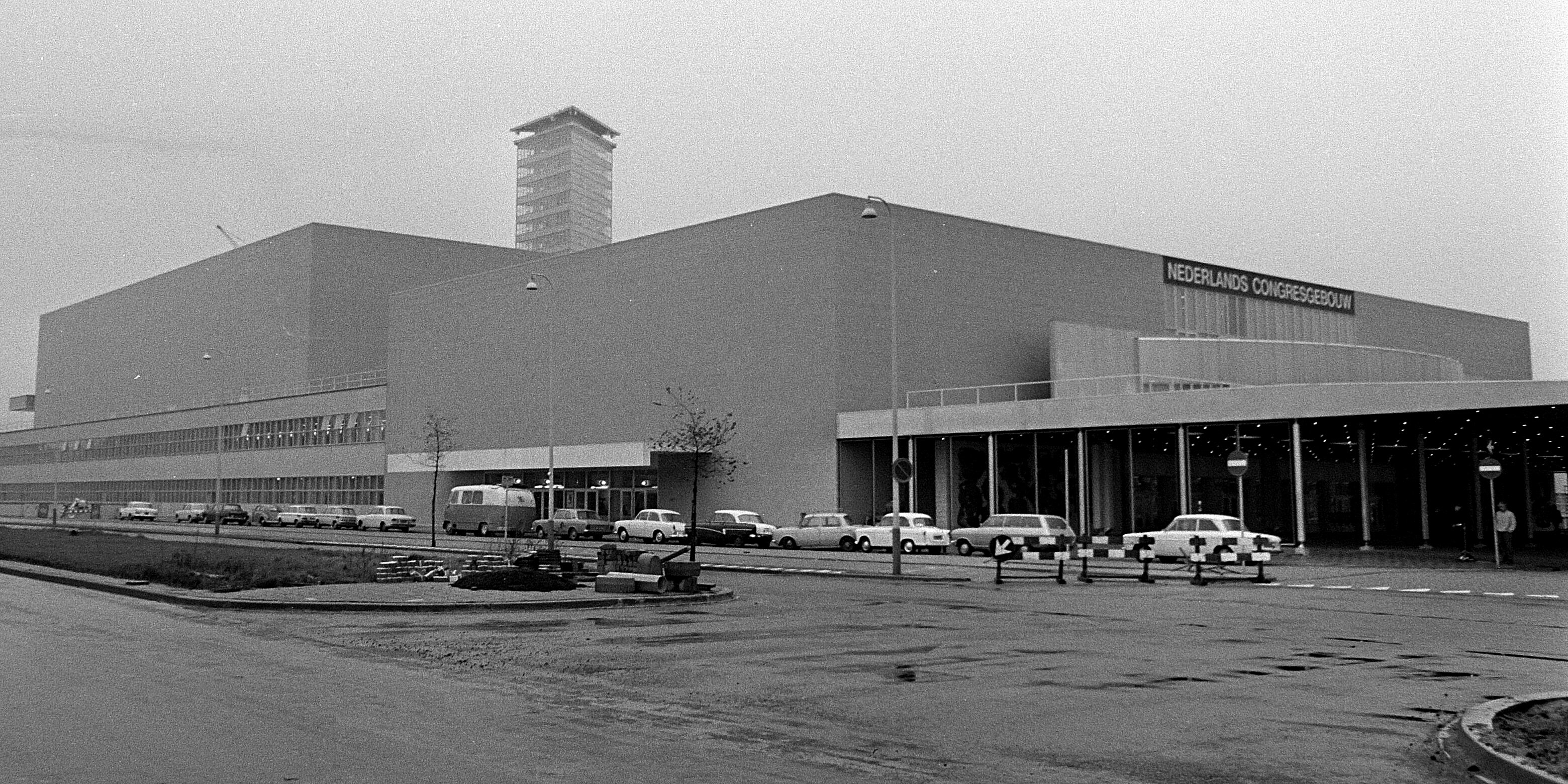
Nederlands Congresgebouw, host venue of the 1980 contest

One month after its win in the 1979 contest, the Israel Broadcasting Authority (IBA) announced at an EBU conference held in Willemstad, Netherlands Antilles that it was considering staging the 1980 edition at an open-air venue, either in Caesarea or at a site on the Sea of Galilee. The broadcaster provisionally scheduled the event for 29 March or 10 May. However, on 13 August 1979, IBA formally renounced its right to host the upcoming edition, as the organisation of the 1979 contest in Jerusalem and investments in the roll-out of colour television had exhausted its financial resources.

The EBU determined that the contest would need to take place on 26 April 1980 and invited member broadcasters interested in staging the event to come forward before 3 September 1979. When the deadline passed, none of them had declared interest in hosting, despite several having examined the possibility of submitting a bid. Runner-up Spain's Televisión Española (TVE) showed no interest, despite the fact that the tourism board of the Costa del Sol had offered the Conference Centre in Torremolinos as a possible venue. In the Netherlands, TROS was eager to stage the event under the auspices of the Nederlandse Omroep Stichting (NOS), but NOS declined to back the bid, preferring to see another broadcaster volunteer.

With no other broadcaster willing to host, the EBU turned to the Netherlands, which remained the only viable option. NOS agreed to host, but on two conditions: the contest had to be moved a week earlier to 19 April due to availability of the Nederlands Congresgebouw, and the EBU had to increase its financial contribution. Once the participating EBU members agreed to these terms, the final decision was made on 23 October 1979 for NOS to host the event in The Hague.

== Participants ==
Eurovision Song Contest 1980 – Participation summaries by country
- Austria; Belgium; Denmark; Finland; France; Germany; Greece; Ireland; Italy; Luxembourg; Morocco; Netherlands; Norway; Portugal; Spain; Sweden; Switzerland; Turkey; United Kingdom

Because the contest was rescheduled for 19 April, it fell on Yom HaZikaron, Israel's memorial day for fallen soldiers. After a prolonged but unsuccessful effort to persuade the EBU to change the date, IBA announced on 10 December 1979 that it would withdraw from the 1980 edition. After Israel announced its absence, Morocco entered the contest for its first, and to date only, participation. Monaco also withdrew from the contest, and would not return until 2004.

Several of the performing artists had previously competed as lead artists representing the same country in past editions: Paola del Medico had represented Switzerland in 1969, Katja Ebstein had represented Germany in 1970 and in 1971, and Maggie MacNeal had represented the Netherlands in 1974 as part of Mouth and MacNeal.

Eurovision Song Contest 1980 participants
Country	Broadcaster	Artist	Song	Language	Songwriter(s)	Conductor
Austria	ORF	Blue Danube	"Du bist Musik"	German	Klaus-Peter Sattler	Richard Oesterreicher
Belgium	RTBF	Telex	"Euro-Vision"	French	Dan Lacksman; Michel Moers; Marc Moulin	No conductor
Denmark	DR	Bamses Venner	"Tænker altid på dig"	Danish	Bjarne Gren Jensen; Flemming Jørgensen	Allan Botschinsky
Finland	YLE	Vesa-Matti Loiri	"Huilumies"	Finnish	Aarno Raninen; Vexi Salmi	Ossi Runne
France	TF1	Profil	"Hé, hé m'sieurs dames"	French	Richard de Bordeaux; Richard Joffo; Sylvano Santorio	Sylvano Santorio
Germany	BR (Note: On behalf of the German public broadcasting consortium ARD)	Katja Ebstein	"Theater"	German	Bernd Meinunger; Ralph Siegel	Wolfgang Rödelberger
Greece	ERT	Anna Vissi and the Epikouri	"Autostop" (Ωτοστόπ)	Greek	Jick Nacassian; Rony Sofou	Jick Nacassian
Ireland	RTÉ	Johnny Logan	"What's Another Year"	English	Shay Healy	Noel Kelehan
Italy	RAI	Alan Sorrenti	"Non so che darei"	Italian	Alan Sorrenti	Del Newman
Luxembourg	CLT	Sophie and Magaly	"Papa Pingouin"	French	Jean-Paul Cara; Pierre Delanoë; Bernd Meinunger; Ralph Siegel	Norbert Daum
Morocco	RTM	Samira Bensaïd	"Bitakat Hob" (بطاقة حب)	Arabic	Abdel Ati Amenna; Malou Rouanne	Jean Claudric
Netherlands	NOS	Maggie MacNeal	"Amsterdam"	Dutch	Alex Alberts; Frans Smit; Sjoukje Smit; Robert Verwey	Rogier van Otterloo
Norway	NRK	Sverre Kjelsberg and Mattis Hætta	"Sámiid ædnan"	Norwegian	Sverre Kjelsberg; Ragnar Olsen	Sigurd Jansen
Portugal	RTP	José Cid	"Um grande, grande amor"	Portuguese	José Cid	Jorge Machado
Spain	TVE	Trigo Limpio	"Quédate esta noche"	Spanish	José Antonio Martín	Javier Iturralde
Sweden	SVT	Tomas Ledin	"Just nu"	Swedish	Tomas Ledin	Anders Berglund
Switzerland	SRG SSR	Paola	"Cinéma"	French	Véronique Müller; Peter Reber	Peter Reber
Turkey	TRT	Ajda Pekkan	"Pet'r Oil"	Turkish	Attila Özdemiroğlu; Şanar Yurdatapan	Attila Özdemiroğlu
United Kingdom	BBC	Prima Donna	"Love Enough for Two"	English	Stephanie De Sykes; Stuart Slater	John Coleman

== Production and format ==
Due to the tight timeline leading up to 19 April 1980, NOS decided to organise the event using an experienced production team consisting of AVRO and KRO employees, who had previously worked on the 1976 edition. This infuriated TROS, which subsequently withdrew from organising the upcoming edition of the Nationaal Songfestival. Theo Ordeman and Fred Oster, both from AVRO, were appointed as the show's director and executive producer. Musical accompaniment was provided by the Metropole Orkest, led by Rogier van Otterloo. The overall budget was ƒ1.5 million (€0.54 million), of which the host broadcaster contributed ƒ900,000 and the EBU contributed ƒ600,000.

=== Visual and stage design ===
As a cost-saving measure in light of the limited budget, NOS decided to recycle several elements of the 1976 production, such as the opening sequence and parts of the set. The stage was designed by Roland de Groot, who had also been responsible for the stage design in 1970 and 1976. The main platform featured a five-step staircase and three curved horizontal panels as a backdrop for the performers. Overhead, a series of cable-suspended geometric elements shifted into different shapes, illuminated by coloured lighting, that changed with each song.

=== Presenter and song announcements ===
The contest was presented by Dutch actress Marlous Fluitsma, who spoke almost entirely in Dutch, switching to English and French only for the official protocols and the voting segment. As with the 1977 and 1978 contests, there were no pre-filmed videos between the songs. Instead, the entries were introduced by a guest presenter appointed by each participating broadcaster, in some cases the same person providing the commentary. Most songs were introduced in the language in which they were performed; however, Ireland's entry was introduced in Irish, despite the song being sung in English. The announcements were accompanied by two or three photographs of the artist at a location in the Netherlands.

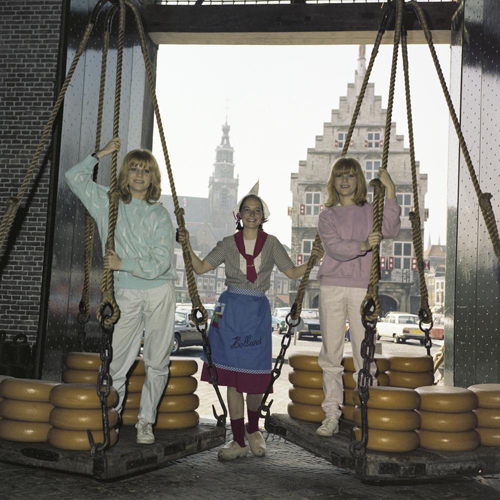
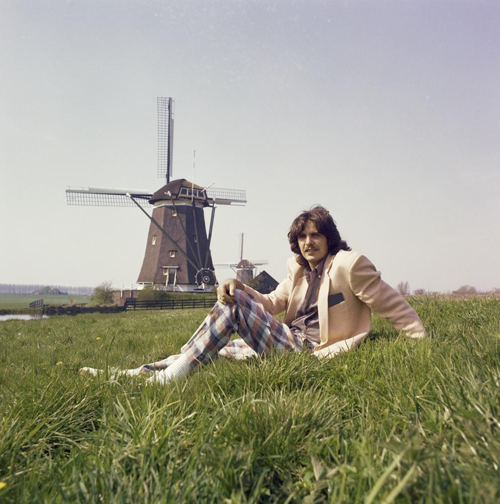
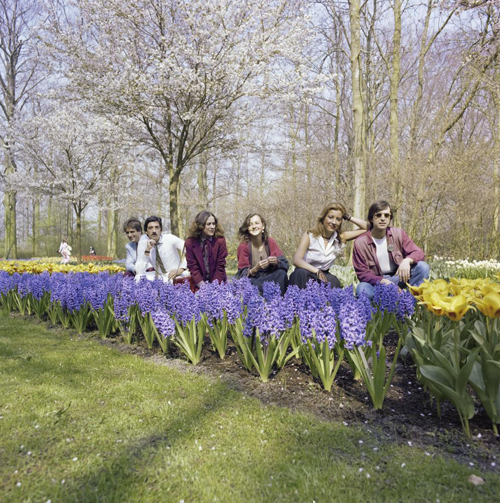
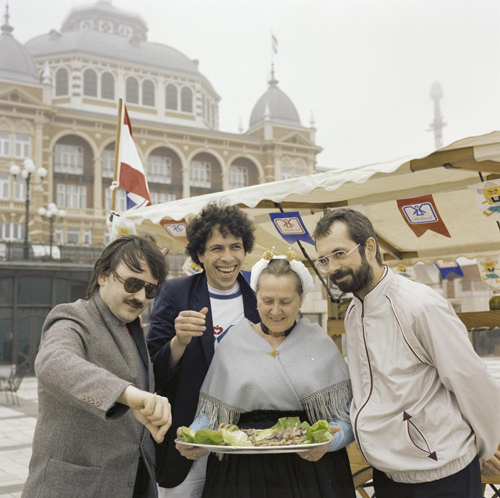
Selection of postcard images shown during the song announcements. Top to bottom, left to right: Luxembourg, Italy, Spain, and Belgium

Country	Postcard location	Announcer
Austria	A petting zoo	Chris Lohner
Belgium	Kurhaus of Scheveningen	Arlette Vincent
Denmark	Aalsmeer Flower Auction	Jørgen de Mylius
Finland	Panorama Mesdag	Heikki Harma
France	A greenhouse	Évelyne Dhéliat
Germany	Madurodam and Hofvijver	Carolin Reiber
Greece	Broeker Veiling	Kelly Sakakou
Ireland	A pub	Thelma Mansfield
Italy	Windmills near Leidschendam	Beatrice Cori
Luxembourg	Cheese market in Gouda	Michèle Etzel
Morocco	Scheveningen harbour	Mohammed Bouzidi
Netherlands	Bloemenmarkt	Marlous Fluitsma
Norway	Zaanse Schans	Åse Kleveland
Portugal	A hotel	Eládio Clímaco
Spain	Keukenhof	Mari Cruz Soriano
Sweden	Port of Rotterdam	Ulf Elfving
Switzerland	A flower stall at Schiphol Airport	Lyliam Stambac
Turkey	Oosterscheldekering construction site	Şebnem Savaşçı
United Kingdom	A cheese farm	Noel Edmonds (Note: Edmonds was incorrectly identified on screen as Noel Edmunds)

== Contest overview ==
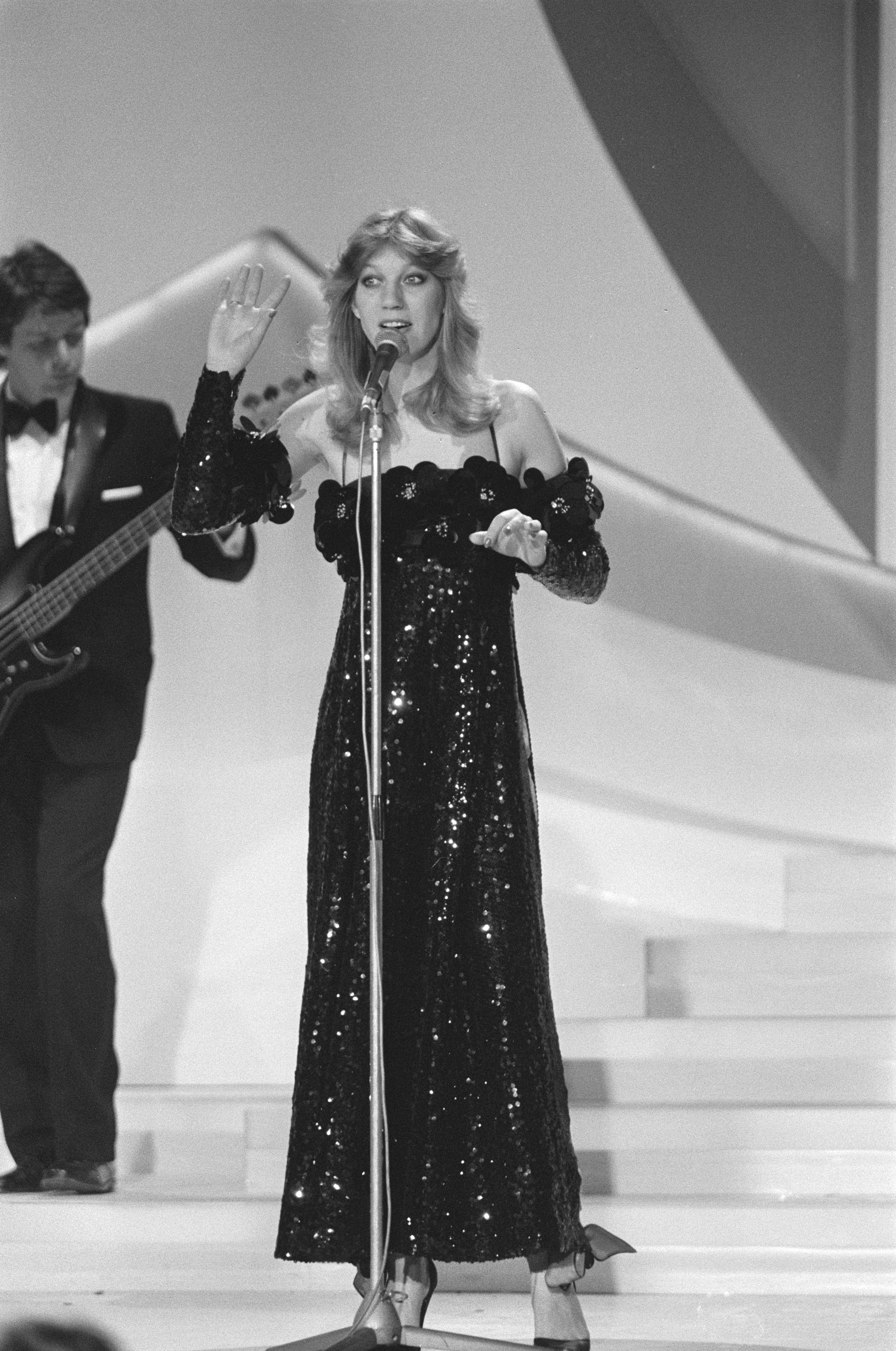
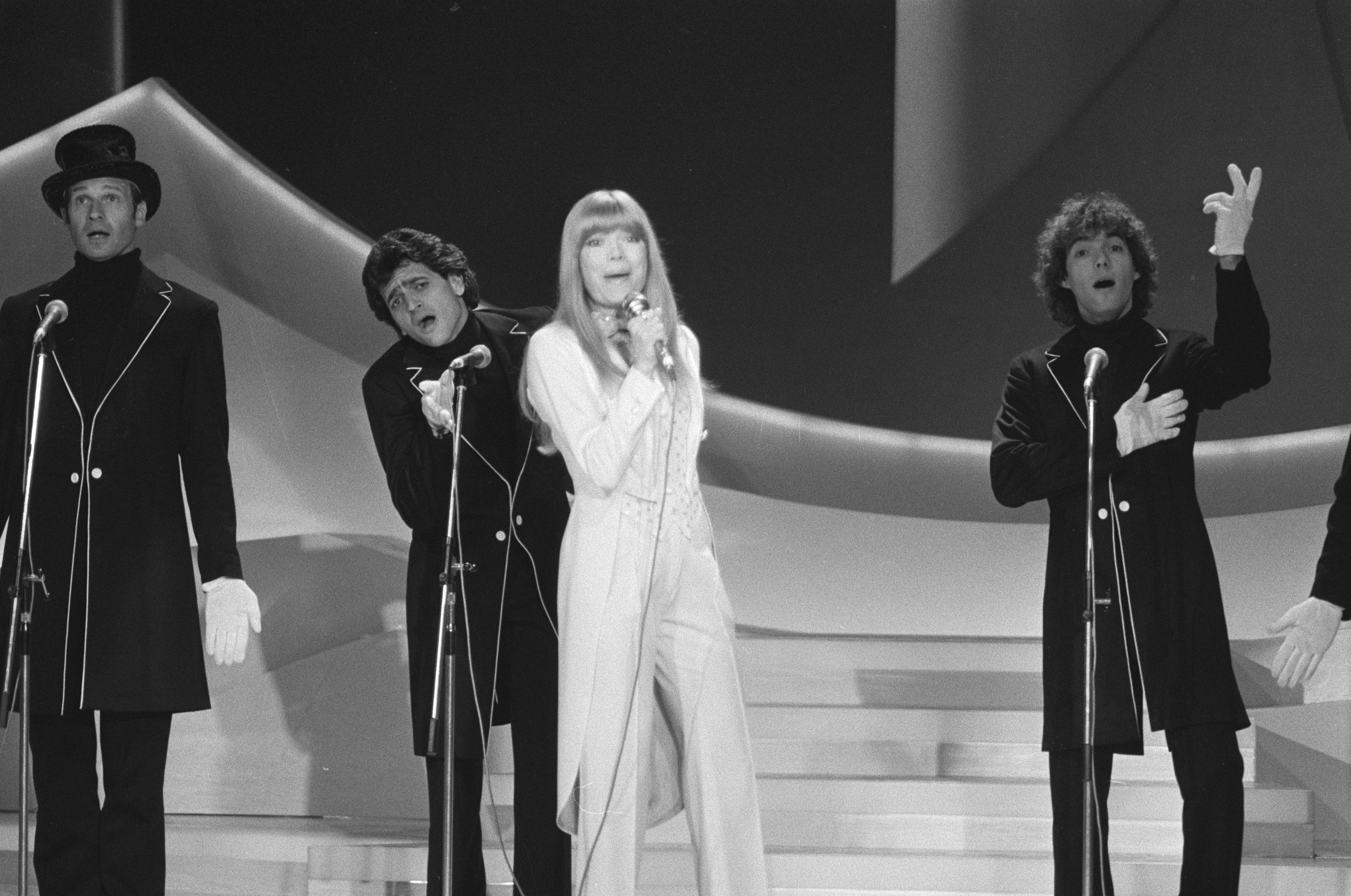
Maggie MacNeal and Katja Ebstein performing their entries

The contest was held on 19 April 1980 at 21:00 CEST and lasted two hours and sixteen minutes. The table below outlines the participating countries, the order in which they performed, and the results of the voting. The Dutch Rhythm Steel & Show Band and the Lee Jackson Dancers performed "San Fernando" as an interval act. The performance was intercut by brief interviews with some of the participants in the backstage green room, conducted by Hans van Willigenburg.

Australian-born Johnny Logan, representing his parents' country Ireland, was crowned the winner with the song "What's Another Year", written by Shay Healy. This was Ireland's second victory in the competition, having previously won in 1970 with "All Kinds of Everything", coincidentally also held on Dutch soil. It was also the first time that a male solo artist had won the contest since Udo Jürgens won for Austria in 1966.

Results of the Eurovision Song Contest 1980
R/O	Country	Artist	Song	Points	Place
1	Austria	Blue Danube	"Du bist Musik"	64	8
2	Turkey	Ajda Pekkan	"Pet'r Oil"	23	15
3	Greece	Anna Vissi and the Epikouri	"Autostop"	30	13
4	Luxembourg	Sophie and Magaly	"Papa Pingouin"	56	9
5	Morocco	Samira Bensaïd	"Bitakat Hob"	7	18
6	Italy	Alan Sorrenti	"Non so che darei"	87	6
7	Denmark	Bamses Venner	"Tænker altid på dig"	25	14
8	Sweden	Tomas Ledin	"Just nu"	47	10
9	Switzerland	Paola	"Cinéma"	104	4
10	Finland	Vesa-Matti Loiri	"Huilumies"	6	19
11	Norway	Sverre Kjelsberg and Mattis Hætta	"Sámiid ædnan"	15	16
12	Germany	Katja Ebstein	"Theater"	128	2
13	United Kingdom	Prima Donna	"Love Enough for Two"	106	3
14	Portugal	José Cid	"Um grande, grande amor"	71	7
15	Netherlands	Maggie MacNeal	"Amsterdam"	93	5
16	France	Profil	"Hé, hé m'sieurs dames"	45	11
17	Ireland	Johnny Logan	"What's Another Year"	143	1
18	Spain	Trigo Limpio	"Quédate esta noche"	38	12
19	Belgium	Telex	"Euro-Vision"	14	17

=== Spokespersons ===
Each participating broadcaster appointed a spokesperson who was responsible for announcing the votes for its respective country via telephone. Known spokespersons at the 1980 contest are listed below.

- Denmark – Bent Evold
- Finland – Kaarina Pönniö
- Ireland – David Hefferman
- Luxembourg – Jacques Harvey
- Sweden – Arne Weise
- Turkey – Başak Doğru
- United Kingdom – Ray Moore

== Detailed voting results ==
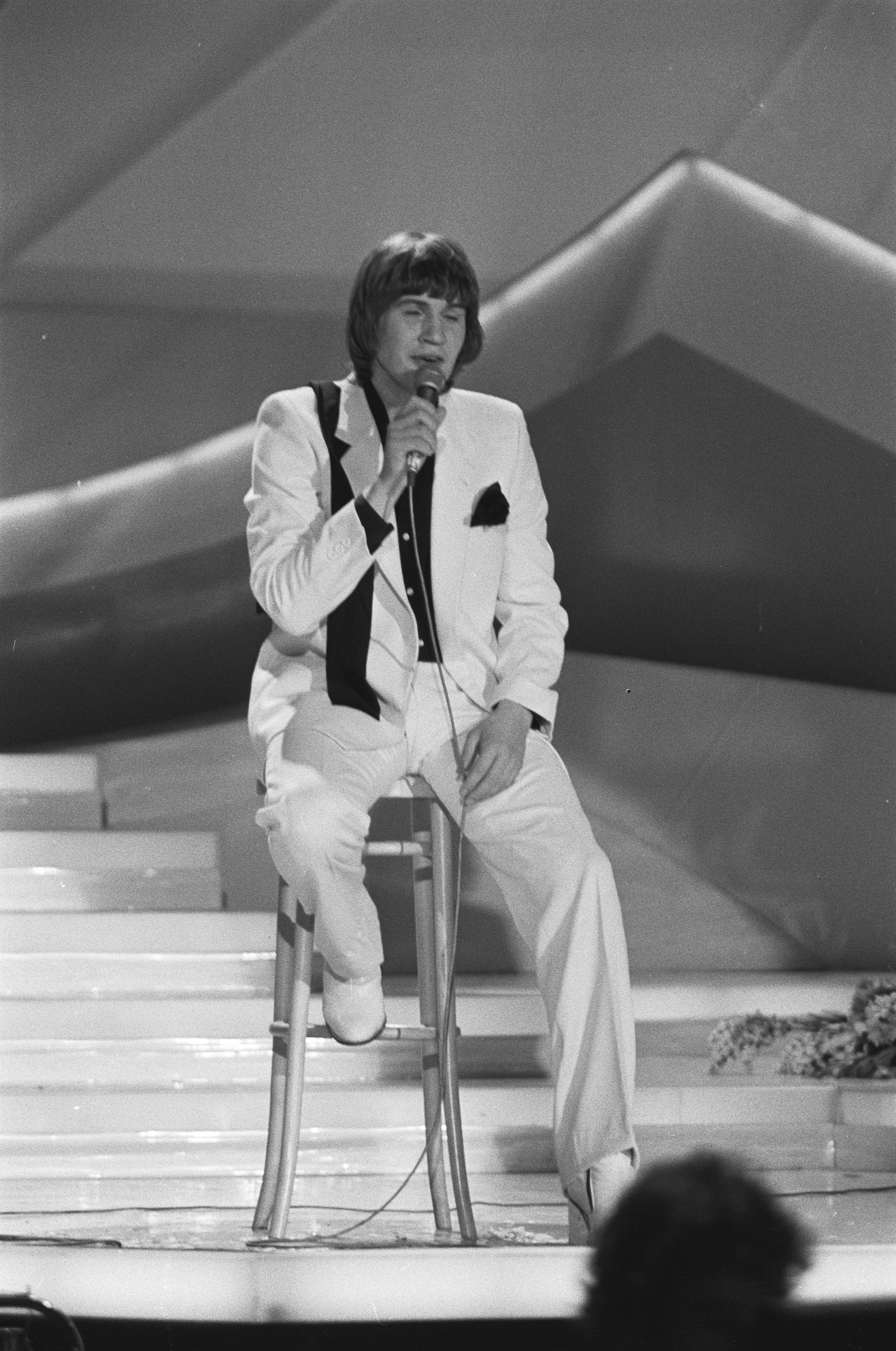
Johnny Logan performing "What's Another Year"

The scoring system implemented in 1975 remained the same; each country had a jury who awarded 12, 10, and 8–1 point(s) for their top ten songs. However this year for the first time, spokespersons were required to declare their scores in ascending order (1, 2, 3, et cetera). This change made for the added excitement of waiting for each country to award their highest 12 points at the end of each voting round.

For the voting sequence, Marlous Fluitsma used a different telephone to speak to each of the nineteen jury spokespersons, although the phones were simply props and were not connected.

Detailed voting results
		Total score	Austria	Turkey	Greece	Luxembourg	Morocco	Italy	Denmark	Sweden	Switzerland	Finland	Norway	Germany	United Kingdom	Portugal	Netherlands	France	Ireland	Spain	Belgium
Contestants	Austria	64			1		3	4	5	1	4	5	6	4	6	3	3	4	10	4	1
Contestants	Turkey	23	3				12	8													
Contestants	Greece	30	5			1		2	2				4		3	1	8		4		
Contestants	Luxembourg	56	1	1					4	6		3	7		8			7	8	3	8
Contestants	Morocco	7						7													
Contestants	Italy	87	2	6	2				3	10	8	6	2	7	4	12	1	2	2	10	10
Contestants	Denmark	25			4		2				6	7	1	5							
Contestants	Sweden	47		8	10	10	6	5			5			2						1	
Contestants	Switzerland	104	6	2		5	7	3	8	2		12	10	10	7	6	10		12	2	2
Contestants	Finland	6											5					1			
Contestants	Norway	15					4							6			2	3			
Contestants	Germany	128	8	10		3	10	12	7	5	7	2			10	8	12	10	5	12	7
Contestants	United Kingdom	106	7	5		8	8		10	12	10	4		3		7	7	5	6	8	6
Contestants	Portugal	71		4	5	4		10	6	8	2	1	8	1			5	6	7		4
Contestants	Netherlands	93	12	12	6	12				3	3	10		8	2	4		12	1	5	3
Contestants	France	45		3	7	2	1		1	4	1		3		5		4		3	6	5
Contestants	Ireland	143	10		12	7		1	12	7	12	8	12	12	12	5	6	8		7	12
Contestants	Spain	38	4	7	8	6	5	6								2					
Contestants	Belgium	14			3										1	10					

=== 12 points ===
Below is a summary of all 12 points in the final:

N.	Contestant	Nation(s) giving 12 points
7	Ireland	Belgium, Denmark, Germany, Greece, Norway, Switzerland, United Kingdom
4	Netherlands	Austria, France, Luxembourg, Turkey
3	Germany	Italy, Netherlands, Spain
2	Switzerland	Finland, Ireland
1	Italy	Portugal
1	Turkey	Morocco
1	United Kingdom	Sweden

== Broadcasts ==
Each participating broadcaster was required to relay the contest via its networks. Non-participating EBU member broadcasters were also able to relay the contest as "passive participants". Broadcasters were able to send commentators to provide coverage of the contest in their own native language and to relay information about the artists and songs to their television viewers. At least 300 journalists were onsite to cover the event.

The contest was also reportedly broadcast in Cyprus, Israel, Iceland, and Jordan; in Czechoslovakia, Poland, Romania, and the Soviet Union via Intervision; and in Cuba, South Korea, and the United Arab Emirates, with an estimated audience of 450 million viewers. The contest was reportedly broadcast via radio in countries including Belgium, Finland, Germany, Ireland, the Netherlands, Norway, Sweden, Turkey, and the United Kingdom. Known details on the broadcasts in each country, including the specific broadcasting stations and commentators are shown in the tables below.

Broadcasters and commentators in participating countries
Country	Broadcaster	Channel(s)	Commentator(s)	Ref(s)
Austria	ORF	FS2	Ernst Grissemann	
Belgium	RTBF	RTBF1	Jacques Mercier	
Belgium	RTBF	RTBF Radio 1		
Belgium	BRT	TV1	Luc Appermont	
Denmark	DR	DR TV	Jørgen de Mylius	
Finland	YLE	TV1, Rinnakkaisohjelma	Heikki Harma	
France	TF1		Patrick Sabatier	
Germany	ARD	Deutsches Fernsehen	Ado Schlier	
Greece	ERT	ERT	Mako Georgiadou	
Ireland	RTÉ	RTÉ 1	Larry Gogan	
Ireland	RTÉ	RTÉ Radio 1	Pat Kenny	
Italy	RAI	Rete Due (Note: Deferred broadcast at 22:00 (CEST))	Michele Gammino	
Luxembourg	CLT	RTL Télé-Luxembourg	Jacques Navadic	
Netherlands	NOS	Nederland 2	Pim Jacobs	
Netherlands	VARA	Hilversum 1	Willem van Beusekom	
Norway	NRK	NRK Fjernsynet	Knut Aunbu	
Norway	NRK	NRK (Note: Deferred broadcast at 22:40 (CET))	Erik Heyerdahl	
Portugal	RTP	RTP1		
Portugal	RDP	RDP Programa 1		
Spain	TVE	TVE 1	Miguel de los Santos	
Sweden	SVT	TV1	Ulf Elfving	
Sweden	RR	SR P3	Kent Finell	
Switzerland	SRG SSR	TV DRS	Theodor Haller	
Switzerland	SRG SSR	TSR	Georges Hardy	
Switzerland	SRG SSR	TSI (Note: Broadcast through a second audio programme on TSR)		
Turkey	TRT	TRT Televizyon	Bülend Özveren	
Turkey	TRT	Radyo 3	Şebnem Savaşçı	
United Kingdom	BBC	BBC1	Terry Wogan	
United Kingdom	BBC	BBC Radio 2 (Note: Simulcast on BBC Radio 1, BBC Radio Birmingham, BBC Radio Blackburn, BBC Radio Carlisle, BBC Radio Cleveland, BBC Radio Derby, BBC Radio Manchester, BBC Radio Merseyside, and BBC Radio Newcastle.)	Steve Jones	
United Kingdom	BFBS	BFBS Radio	Andrew Pastouna	

Broadcasters and commentators in non-participating countries
Country	Broadcaster	Channel(s)	Commentator(s)	Ref(s)
Cyprus	CyBC	RIK		
Hong Kong	TVB	TVB Jade (Note: Deferred broadcast the following day at 9:30 (HKT))		
Hong Kong	TVB	TVB Pearl		
Iceland	RÚV	Sjónvarpið (Note: Delayed broadcast on 26 April 1980 at 21:30 (WET))	Björn Baldursson	
Israel	IBA	Israeli Television (Note: Delayed broadcast on 20 April 1980 at 21:30 (IST))		
Israel	IBA	Reshet Bet, Reshet Gimel		
Jordan	JTV	JTV2		
Netherlands Antilles	ATM	TeleAruba (Note: Delayed broadcast on 20 July 1980 at 16:00 (ADT))		
Romania	TVR	Programul 1 (Note: Delayed broadcast in a shortened format on 4 May 1980 at 14:40 (EET))		
South Korea	KBS	KBS (Note: Delayed broadcast on 3 May 1980 at 22:30 (KST))		
