= Denmark in the Eurovision Song Contest 1980 =

- Eurovision Song Contest 1980
- Participating broadcaster: Danmarks Radio (DR)
- Country: Denmark
- Selection process: Dansk Melodi Grand Prix 1980
- Selection date: 29 March 1980

Competing entry
- Song: "Tænker altid på dig"
- Artist: Bamses Venner
- Songwriters: Bjarne Gren Jensen; Flemming Jørgensen

Placement
- Final result: 14th, 25 points

Participation chronology

Denmark was represented at the Eurovision Song Contest 1980 with the song "Tænker altid på dig", composed by Bjarne Gren Jensen, with lyrics by Flemming Jørgensen, and performed by Bamses Venner. The Danish participating broadcaster, Danmarks Radio (DR), organised the Dansk Melodi Grand Prix 1980 in order to select its entry for the contest.

== Before Eurovision ==
=== Melodi Grand Prix 1980 ===
Danmarks Radio (DR) held the Melodi Grand Prix 1980 on 29 March at the Falkonér Theatre in Copenhagen, hosted by Jørgen de Mylius. 12 songs took part with the winner being decided by votes from a jury made up of members of the public.

Other participants in the national final included Danish Eurovision winners Grethe Ingmann and the Olsen Brothers, and 1989 entrant Birthe Kjær.

Final – 29 March 1980
| R/O | Artist | Song | Points | Place |
|---|---|---|---|---|
| 1 | Vivian Johansen | "Jeg er fængslet af dig" | 39 | 11 |
| 2 | Tommy P. | "Syng en sang om evig fred" | 57 | 8 |
| 3 | The Lollipops | "Nu er det morgen" | 61 | 5 |
| 4 | Susanne Breuning | "Mozart Jensen" | 39 | 11 |
| 5 | Bamses Venner | "Tænker altid på dig" | 84 | 1 |
| 6 | Grethe Ingmann | "Hej, hej, det swinger" | 69 | 3 |
| 7 | Daimi Gentle | "Fri mig" | 43 | 10 |
| 8 | Birthe Kjær and Henning Vilén | "Du og jeg" | 77 | 2 |
| 9 | Olsen Brothers | "Laila" | 61 | 5 |
| 10 | McKinleys | "Robin Hood" | 47 | 9 |
| 11 | Hans Mosters Vovse | "Swingtime igen" | 65 | 4 |
| 12 | Lecia and Lucienne | "Bye-bye" | 59 | 7 |

Detailed Jury Votes
| R/O | Song | Jurors | | | | | | | | | | | Total |
| R/O | Song | 01 | 02 | 03 | 04 | 05 | 06 | 07 | 08 | 09 | 10 | 11 | Total |
|---|---|---|---|---|---|---|---|---|---|---|---|---|---|
| 1 | "Jeg er fængslet af dig" | 3 | 3 | 5 | 4 | 4 | 3 | 4 | 1 | 4 | 4 | 4 | 39 |
| 2 | "Syng en sang om evig fred" | 1 | 4 | 8 | 6 | 6 | 9 | 3 | 2 | 5 | 7 | 6 | 57 |
| 3 | "Nu er det morgen" | 5 | 9 | 7 | 3 | 5 | 5 | 6 | 7 | 5 | 3 | 6 | 61 |
| 4 | "Mozart Jensen" | 3 | 5 | 2 | 0 | 5 | 2 | 5 | 1 | 8 | 3 | 5 | 39 |
| 5 | "Tænker altid på dig" | 8 | 9 | 9 | 7 | 7 | 6 | 9 | 7 | 7 | 9 | 6 | 84 |
| 6 | "Hej, hej, det swinger" | 9 | 6 | 6 | 9 | 8 | 3 | 3 | 4 | 8 | 6 | 7 | 69 |
| 7 | "Fri mig" | 6 | 4 | 3 | 2 | 6 | 2 | 4 | 3 | 4 | 4 | 5 | 43 |
| 8 | "Du och jeg" | 7 | 6 | 7 | 9 | 4 | 8 | 4 | 9 | 8 | 8 | 7 | 77 |
| 9 | "Laila" | 6 | 8 | 8 | 4 | 4 | 3 | 8 | 5 | 6 | 5 | 4 | 61 |
| 10 | "Robin Hood" | 2 | 8 | 2 | 1 | 4 | 2 | 5 | 8 | 7 | 2 | 6 | 47 |
| 11 | "Swingtime igen" | 5 | 7 | 5 | 6 | 8 | 2 | 4 | 7 | 9 | 4 | 8 | 65 |
| 12 | "Bye-bye" | 2 | 7 | 5 | 4 | 7 | 6 | 5 | 5 | 5 | 5 | 8 | 59 |

== At Eurovision ==
On the evening of the final Bamses Venner performed 7th in the running order, following Italy and preceding Sweden. At the close of voting "Tænker altid på dig" had received 25 points, placing Denmark 14th of the 19 entries. The Danish jury awarded its 12 points to contest winners Ireland.

The contest was broadcast on DR TV, with commentary by Jørgen de Mylius.

=== Voting ===
Points awarded to Denmark
| Score | Country |
|---|---|
| 12 points | |
| 10 points | |
| 8 points | |
| 7 points | Finland |
| 6 points | Switzerland |
| 5 points | Germany |
| 4 points | Greece |
| 3 points | |
| 2 points | Morocco |
| 1 point | Norway |

Points awarded by Denmark
| Score | Country |
|---|---|
| 12 points | Ireland |
| 10 points | United Kingdom |
| 8 points | Switzerland |
| 7 points | Germany |
| 6 points | Portugal |
| 5 points | Austria |
| 4 points | Luxembourg |
| 3 points | Italy |
| 2 points | Greece |
| 1 point | France |
