= Marlous Fluitsma =

Dutch actress (born 1946)

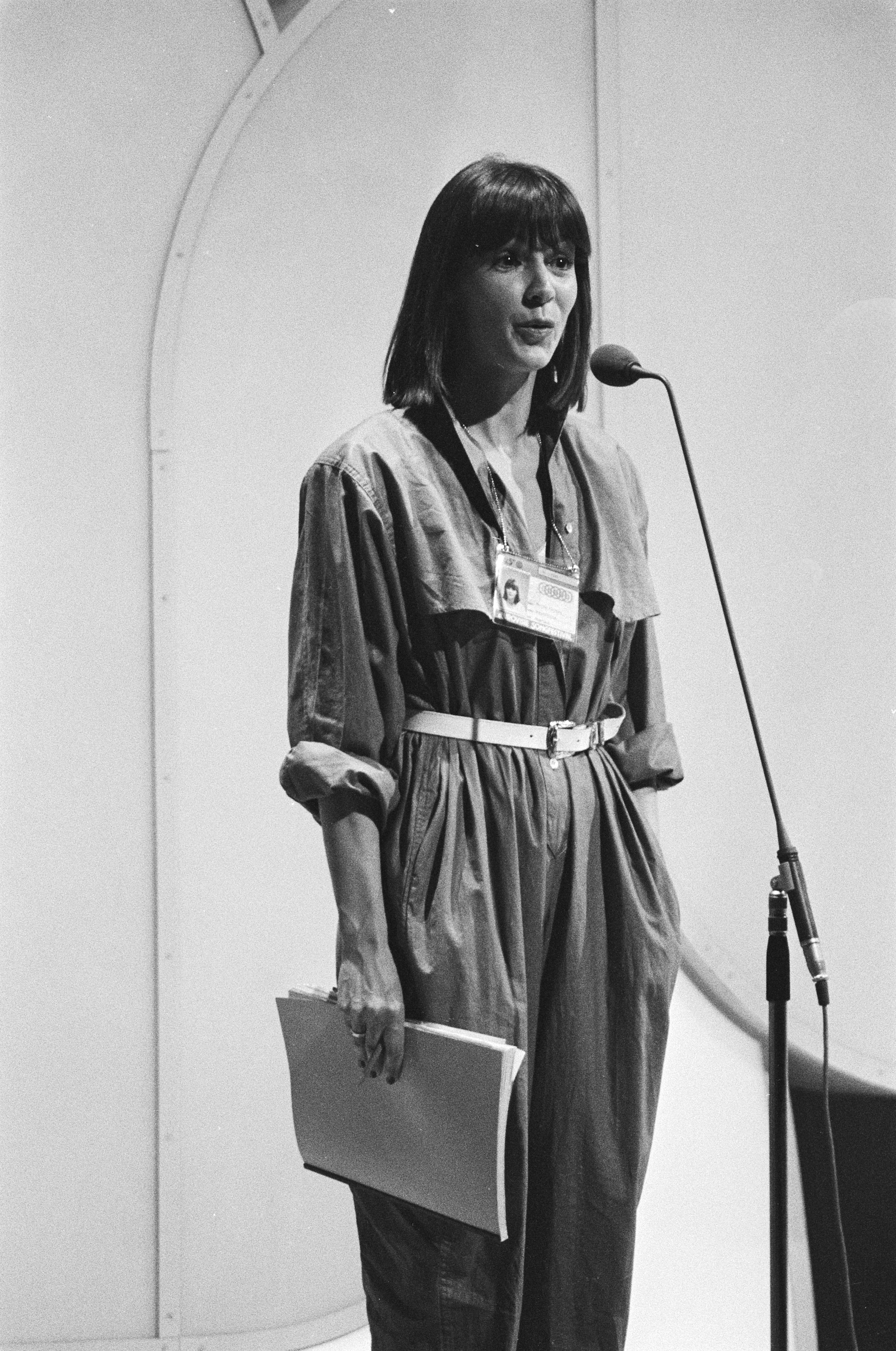
- Fluitsma rehearsing for the Eurovision Song Contest 1980
- Born: Maria Louise Clara Albertine Fluitsma; 12 December 1946 (age 79); Zutphen, Netherlands
- Occupation: Actress
- Spouse: Herman van Veen (m. 1972; div. 1993)
- Children: 2, Merlijn and Anne

Maria Louise Clara Albertine "Marlous" Fluitsma (born 12 December 1946) is a Dutch actress, known for her roles in Dutch films and on television in various Dutch language series. She is also known outside the Netherlands for hosting the Eurovision Song Contest 1980, held in The Hague.

== Early life ==
Fluitsma grew up in Nijmegen where her father was a teacher. After her studies at the Stage Acting Academy in Maastricht, she played for the Groot Limburgs Toneel (the largest acting group in Limburg province) and for the Haagse Comedie (The Hague Comedy Group).

== Career credits ==
She became better known when she played the lead role in a play written by Herman van Veen: De Spinse (1973). She appeared in the movies Uit elkaar (1979) and Ik ben Joep Meloen (1981), as well as the television series Pommetje Horlepiep (1976) and De Fabriek (1981). On 19 April 1980, Fluitsma presented the Eurovision Song Contest in the Congresgebouw in The Hague.

From 1990 until the end of 1991, she played "Helen Helmink" in the soap opera Goede tijden, slechte tijden. When she indicated she wanted to spend more time with her family, she was replaced by Bruni Heinke. It was the first time a recast had ever happened in Dutch soap opera. While on Goede tijden, slechte tijden, she played Eliza Zadelhof on the series Diamant (1990) and also appeared in Ernstige Delicten.

== Personal life ==
From her previous marriage to Herman van Veen she has two children, Merlijn (b. April 5, 1978) and Anne (b. June 30, 1983). Fluitsma currently lives in Soest.

== See also ==
- List of Eurovision Song Contest presenters

Preceded by (Israel) Daniel Pe'er and Yardena Arazi	Eurovision Song Contest presenter 1980	Succeeded by (Republic of Ireland) Doireann Ní Bhriain
