= Sweden in the Eurovision Song Contest 1980 =

- Eurovision Song Contest 1980
- Participating broadcaster: Sveriges Television (SVT)
- Country: Sweden
- Selection process: Melodifestivalen 1980
- Selection date: 8 March 1980

Competing entry
- Song: "Just nu!"
- Artist: Tomas Ledin
- Songwriter: Tomas Ledin

Placement
- Final result: 10th, 47 points

Participation chronology

Sweden was represented at the Eurovision Song Contest 1980 with the song "Just nu!", written and performed by Tomas Ledin. The Swedish participating broadcaster, Sveriges Television (SVT), selected its entry through Melodifestivalen 1980.

== Before Eurovision ==
=== Melodifestivalen 1980 ===
Melodifestivalen 1980 was the selection for the 20th song to represent Sweden at the Eurovision Song Contest. It was the 19th time that this system of picking a song had been used. 120 songs were submitted to Sveriges Television (SVT) for the competition. The final was held in the SVT Studios in Stockholm on 8 March 1980, presented by Bengt Bedrup and broadcast on TV1 but was not broadcast on radio.

R/O	Artist	Song	Songwriter(s)	Points	Place
1	Tomas Ledin	"Just nu!"	Tomas Ledin	112	1
2	Paul Paljett	"Tusen sekunder"	Britta Johansson; Torgny Söderberg	32	9
3	Kenta	"Utan att fråga"	Kenta Gustafsson; Bo Rosendahl	56	6
4	Eva Dahlgren	"Jag ger mig inte"	Eva Dahlgren	48	7
5	Ted Gärdestad and Annica Boller	"Låt solen värma dig"	Ted Gärdestad; Kenneth Gärdestad	57	5
6	Chips	"Mycke' mycke' mer"	Torgny Söderberg; Lasse Holm	75	4
7	Liza Öhman	"Hit men inte längre"	Bengt Palmers	94	3
8	Lasse Lindbom	"För dina bruna ögons skull"	Per Gessle; Mats Persson	27	10
9	Janne Lucas	"Växeln hallå"	Lasse Holm; Gert Lengstrand	96	2
10	Tania	"Å sjuttiotal"	Torgny Söderberg	41	8

Voting
R/O	Song	Luleå	Falun	Karlstad	Gothenburg	Umeå	Örebro	Norrköping	Malmö	Sundsvall	Växjö	Stockholm	Total
1	"Just nu!"	12	8	10	10	10	12	10	12	12	6	10	112
2	"Tusen sekunder"	2	4	1	2	3	1	2	6	4	4	3	32
3	"Utan att fråga"	5	12	6	6	6	8	3	2	3	3	2	56
4	"Jag ger mig inte"	4	5	3	4	2	6	8	5	2	5	4	48
5	"Låt solen värma dig"	6	2	12	7	7	3	4	7	6	2	1	57
6	"Mycke' mycke' mer"	8	6	5	5	4	5	12	8	5	10	7	75
7	"Hit men inte längre"	7	10	8	8	8	7	6	10	10	8	12	94
8	"För dina bruna ögons skull"	1	1	4	3	5	4	1	1	1	1	5	27
9	"Växeln hallå"	10	7	7	12	12	10	7	4	7	12	8	96
10	"Å sjuttiotal"	3	3	2	1	1	2	5	3	8	7	6	41

== At Eurovision ==
At the final in The Hague, he came 10th (out of 19) with 47 points. He had the draw number #8. As of 2021, this is the most recent occasion on which Sweden has failed to score any points from the other participating Nordic nations (and, in turn, it was the last contest final until 2024 to see the Swedish jury fail to award any points to another Nordic nation, save for 2016 when Sweden was the only Nordic nation in the final).

=== Voting ===
Points awarded to Sweden
Score	Country
12 points	
10 points	Greece; Luxembourg
8 points	Turkey
7 points	
6 points	Morocco
5 points	Italy; Switzerland
4 points	
3 points	
2 points	Germany
1 point	Spain

Points awarded by Sweden
Score	Country
12 points	United Kingdom
10 points	Italy
8 points	Portugal
7 points	Ireland
6 points	Luxembourg
5 points	Germany
4 points	France
3 points	Netherlands
2 points	Switzerland
1 point	Austria
