= Beatrice Cori =

Beatrice Cori (1978)

Beatrice Cori (real name Beatrice Cagnoni) (20 March 1943 - 8 February 2000) was an Italian Rai television presenter and model. She introduced the Italian entry sung by Alan Sorrenti in Eurovision Song Contest 1980.
