= Sigurd Jansen =

Norwegian musician (born 1932)

Sigurd Jansen (born 4 March 1932) is a Norwegian composer, pianist and conductor.

== Biography ==
Sigurd Alf Jansen was born in Horten, in Vestfold county, Norway. He studied classical music at the Norwegian Academy of Music in Oslo. He was a teacher of piano from 1957 to 1962.

== Conductor ==
Internationally, he has served as conductor for his own compositions and arrangements with, among others, the following:

- Malmö Symphony Orchestra
- Bergen Philharmonic Orchestra
- BBC Symphony Orchestra
- Metropol Orchestra in the Netherlands
- Danish National Symphony Orchestra
- Symphony Orchestra in Hannover

Sigurd Jansen was the conductor of six Norwegian entries in Eurovision Song Contest between 1979 and 1984.

- Oliver (1979)
- Sámiid Ædnan (1980)
- Aldri i livet (1981)
- Adieu (1982)
- Do Re Mi (1983)
- Lenge Leve Livet (1984)

== Films ==
He wrote the score of these films:

- 1972: Takt og tone i himmelsengen (Danish)
- 1967: Elsk...din næste (Danish)
- 1965: De kalte ham Skarven (Norwegian)

== Awards ==
Jansen has received a number of awards:

- Spellemannprisen (Norwegian Grammy Award) - 1972
- Nordring Award for Best Music Producer - 1973
- Nordring Award for Best Music Arranger - 1975
