= Agit-prop (band) =

Finnish communist vocal ensemble

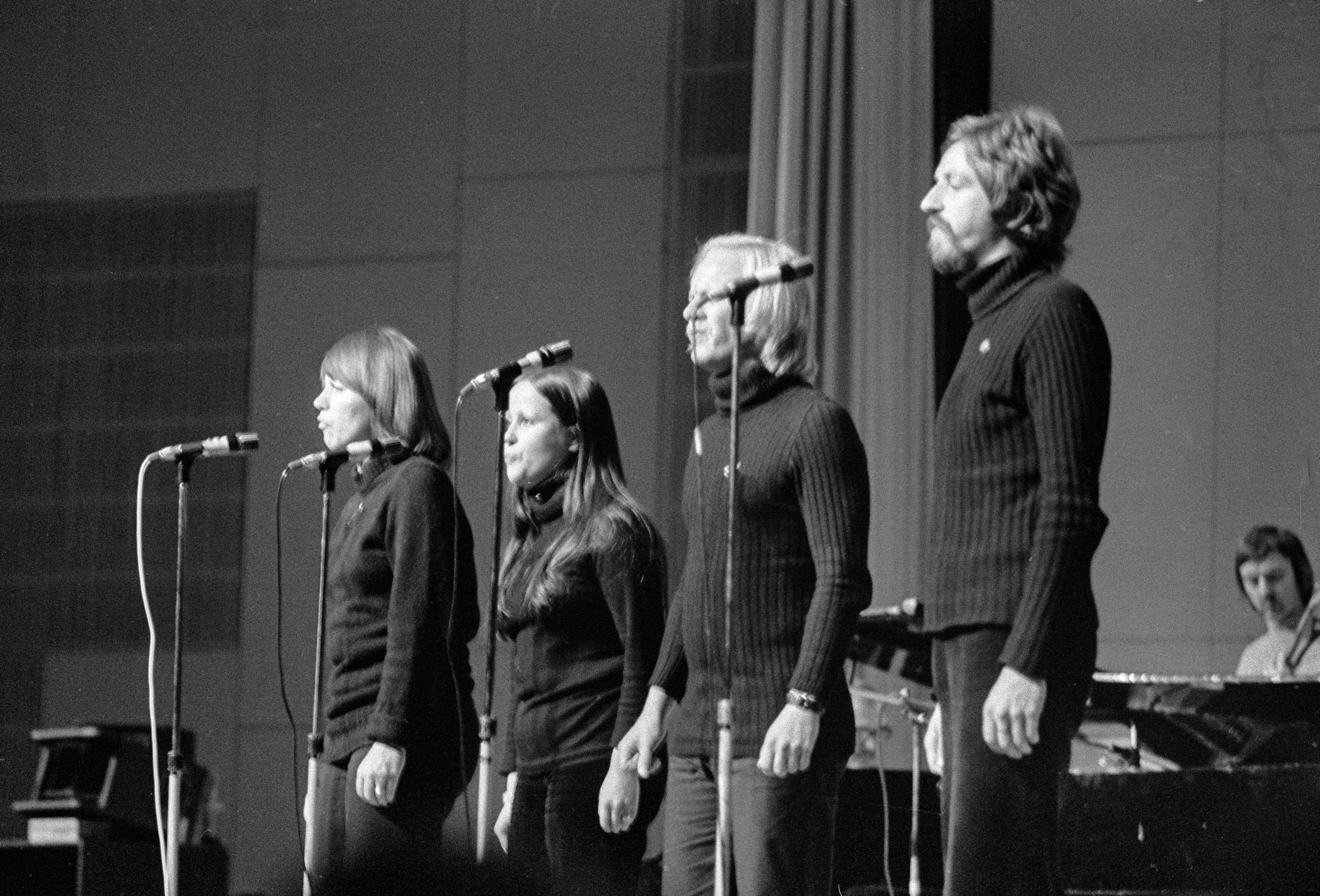
Agit-prop performing in Helsinki on 12 October 1974

Agit-prop is a Finnish communist singer group, whose career began in the 1970s and after a break, have now started touring again. The band was a part of the minority wing in Communist Party of Finland and most of their songs were used to get their cause through. Agit-prop was a great influence to the group Ultra Bra.

The band's founding members were Sinikka Sokka, Pekka Aarnio, Kiti Neuvonen and Martti Launis. Later lineups included Monna Kamu, Liisa Tavi and Anu Saari.

== Discography ==
=== Albums ===
- Agit-prop -kvartetti laulaa työväenlauluja (Love 1972)
- Laulu kaikille (Love 1974)
- Agit Prop 1970–1977 (1995)
