= Katja Ebstein =

German singer (born 1945)

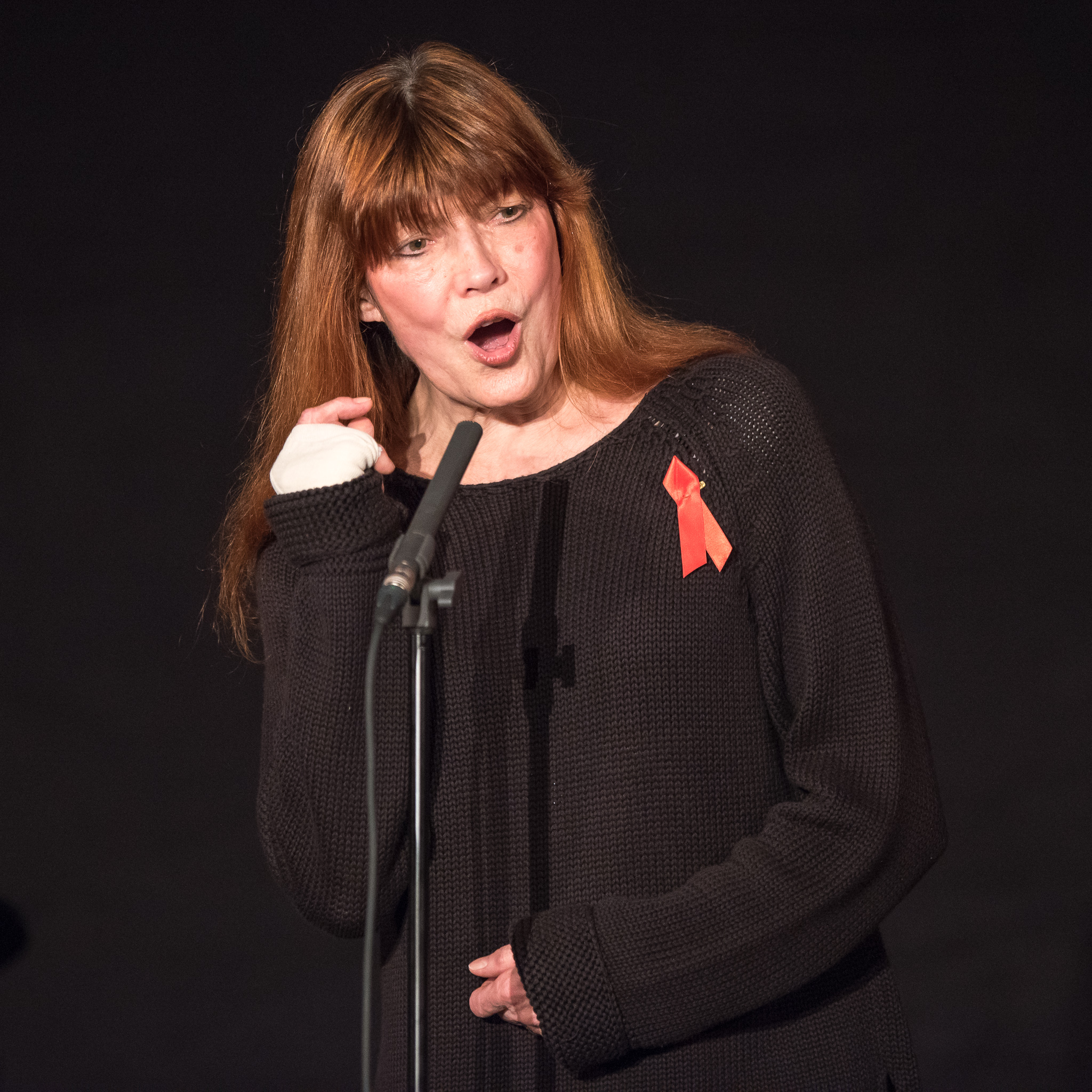
- Ebstein in 2016

Background information
- Born: Karin Witkiewicz; 9 March 1945 (age 81); Girlachsdorf, Greater German Reich (now Gniewków, Poland)
- Genres: Schlager
- Occupation: Singer
- Years active: 1969–present

Katja Ebstein (born Karin Witkiewicz; 9 March 1945) is a German singer. She was born in Girlachsdorf (now Gniewków, Poland). She achieved success with songs such as "Theater" and "Es war einmal ein Jäger". She was married to Christian Bruhn, who wrote many of her songs.

Ebstein represented Germany at the Eurovision Song Contest three times, in 1970, 1971 and 1980. She also took part in Ein Lied für Stockholm in 1975 with the song "Ich liebe dich", placing 5th in the selection. Her best performance was in 1980 when she gained second place with the entry "Theater", her other two songs "Wunder gibt es immer wieder" and "Diese Welt" each came to third places. As noted by John Kennedy O'Connor in his book The Eurovision Song Contest – The Official History, Ebstein is the most successful performer to have taken part in the contest without ever winning. She is the only singer to appear in the top three on three occasions, without winning.

== Discography ==
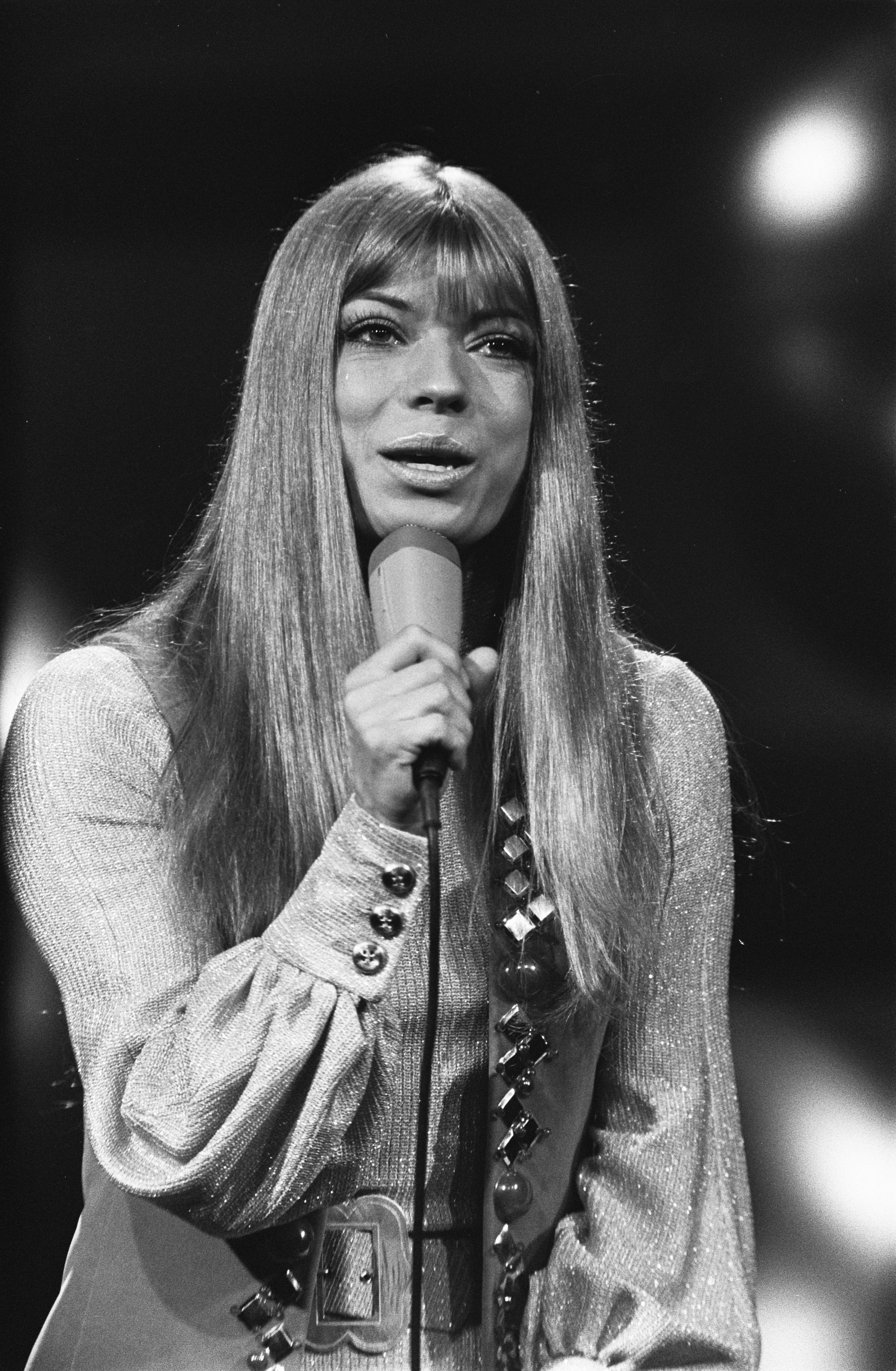
Ebstein at the Eurovision Song Contest 1970 in Amsterdam

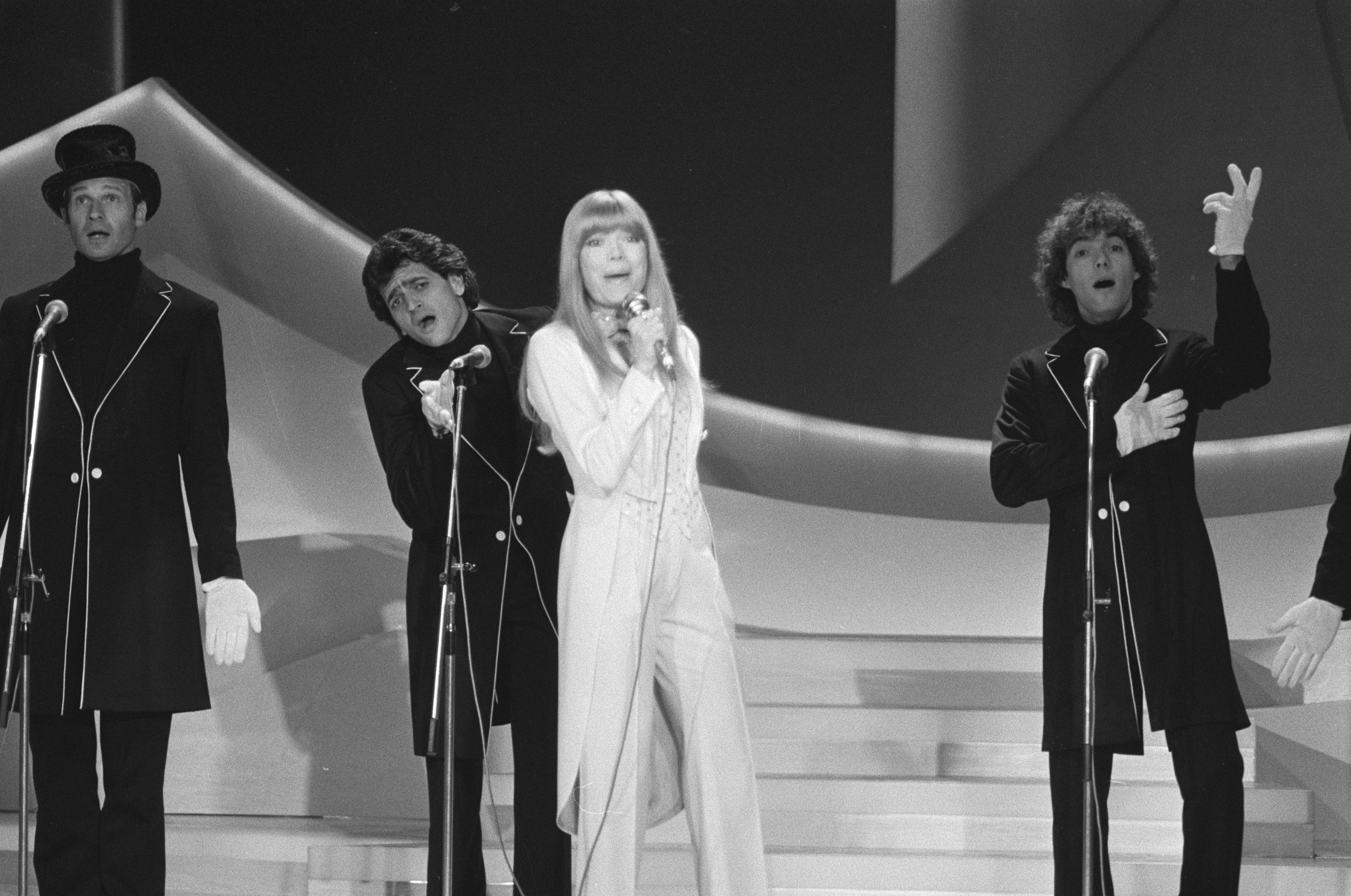
Ebstein rehearsing for the Eurovision Song Contest 1980

=== Albums ===
List of albums, with selected chart positions
Title	Album details	Peak chart positions
Title	Album details	GER
Katja	Released: 1968; Label: Liberty	—
Wunder Gibt Es Immer Wieder	Released: 1970; Label: Liberty	—
Mein Leben ist wie ein Lied	Released: November 1970; Label: Liberty	11
Freunde	Released: 1971; Label: United Artists	44
Katja Ebstein en español	Released: 1971; Label: United Artists	—
Wir leben	Released: 1972; Label: United Artists	—
Katja	Released: 1973; Label: United Artists	37
...Was ich noch singen wollte	Released: 1974; Label: United Artists	43
The Star of Mykonos	Released: 1974; Label: United Artists	—
Wilde Rosen Und Andere Träume	Released: 1974; Label: EMI Electrola	—
Katja Ebstein singt Heinrich Heine	Released: 1975; Label: EMI Electrola	—
Katja & Co.	Released: 1976; Label: EMI Electrola	—
In Petersburg ist Pferdemarkt	Released: 1976; Label: EMI Electrola	—
Liebe	Released: 1977; Label: EMI Electrola	—
So Wat Wie Ick Et Bin...	Released: 1978; Label: EMI Electrola	—
Glashaus	Released: 1980; Label: Ariola	19
He Du Da ...	Released: 1980; Label: Ariola	—
Kopf Hoch	Released: 1981; Label: Ariola	—
Traumzeit???	Released: 1982; Label: Ariola	—
Lyrikerinnen (with Lutz Görner)	Released: 1990; Label: Rezitheater-Verlag	—
Ich Rutsche Auf Der Rutsche (with Lila Lutsche)	Released: 1991; Label: Igel-Records	—
Ebstein	Released: 1994; Label: Polydor	—
Witkiewicz	Released: 2005; Label: EMI	—

== Charted singles ==
List of singles, with selected chart positions
Year	Title	Peak chart positions		
Year	Title	GER	AUS	SWI
1970	"Wunder gibt es immer wieder "	16	—	—
1970	"Und wenn ein neuer Tag erwacht"	28	—	—
1971	"Diese Welt"	16	—	—
1971	"Ein kleines Lied vom Frieden"	47	—	—
1973	"Der Stern von Mykonos" "The Star of Mykonos"	4	6	2
1974	"Ein Indiojunge aus Peru"	22	—	—
1974	"Athena"	30	—	—
1974	"Es war einmal ein Jäger"	4	—	—
1975	"Die Hälfte seines Lebens"	25	—	—
1976	"Aus Liebe weint man nicht"	48	—	—
1976	"In Petersburg ist Pferdemarkt"	38	—	—
1980	"Abschied ist ein bißchen wie sterben"	10	—	—
1980	"Theater"	11	—	—
1980	"Dann heirat' doch dein Büro"	30	—	—

Preceded by Siw Malmkvist with Primaballerina	Germany in the Eurovision Song Contest; 1970 & 1971	Succeeded by Mary Roos with Nur die Liebe läßt uns leben
Preceded by Dschinghis Khan with Dschinghis Khan	Germany in the Eurovision Song Contest; 1980	Succeeded by Lena Valaitis with Johnny Blue
