= Morocco in the Eurovision Song Contest =

- Eurovision Song Contest
- Participating broadcaster: Radiodiffusion-Télévision Marocaine (RTM)

Participation summary
- Appearances: 1
- First appearance: 1980
- Last appearance: 1980
- Highest placement: 18th: 1980
- Participation history: 1980; 1981 – 2026
- Morocco's page at Eurovision.com

Morocco was represented at the Eurovision Song Contest for its first and only time at the 1980 contest. Its selected song "Bitakat Hob", sung in Arabic and performed by Samira Bensaïd, placed second to last. The country has not returned to the contest since. It is the first and only African country to have ever taken part.

== Background ==
The Eurovision Song Contest is an annual international song competition held since 1956 by the European Broadcasting Union (EBU) between its members who participate representing their countries. Each participating broadcaster submits an original song to be performed on live television and radio, then casts votes for the other countries' songs to determine the winner. Since its inception, entry to the contest has been open to all members of the EBU, a group also containing broadcasters from countries in North Africa and the Middle East.

The Moroccan public broadcaster Société nationale de radiodiffusion et de télévision (SNRT) is a full member of the EBU, thus eligible to participate in the Eurovision Song Contest representing Morocco. It is believed, however, that the broadcaster has declined to take part in the contest due to Israel's presence. SNRT's predecessor, Radiodiffusion-Télévision Marocaine (RTM), which had previously broadcast select contests in the 1960s and 1970s, participated in the 1980 contest when Israel was absent. This was the first, and to date the only time, that Morocco has participated in Eurovision.

Before Morocco's 1980 participation, Tunisia (at the 1977 contest) was the only African country that had intended to compete, with it even being drawn to perform fourth, however, it eventually withdrew from the contest.

== 1980 participation ==
Record cover for "Bitakat Hob", with text noting it as the Moroccan entry at the Eurovision Song Contest 1980.

In 1979, Jamal Irassi (one of the most prominent figures on the "International Radio Channel" at that time) suggested the idea of Morocco competing in the Eurovision Song Contest to the RTM director Drissi Kaïtouni, although at first skeptic the idea won him over at the end (most likely after consulting with others). He gave his approval to approach Eurovision participation in the edition scheduled next year in The Netherlands.

With the key in hand, the crew sprang into action with a short notice. A contribution of 10,000 Dirhams (900 Euros) not a small budget at that time covering participation fees, transportation and accommodation for the delegation, a whole file meticulously monitored and finalized by the administrative and financial director Mehdi Bouzekri.

Everything was planned, but one question remaining - Who will represent the Kingdom? The delegation immediately thought of composer Abdelaâti Amenna. Amenna began searching for the rare gem out of hundreds of texts emanating from artists. The choice fell on a kind of hymn to peace signed by Malou Rouane, a teacher in Kenitra and a poet in his spare time. Only the interpreter remained, RTM at first considered Trio Amenna, but at the end chose Samira Bensaïd.

RTM selected the song "Bitakat Hob", performed by Moroccan singer Samira Bensaïd as the first entrant from Morocco in the contest. It is a moderately up-tempo number, with clear influences from Western disco and Arabic overtones. Bensaïd sings of the need for peace among the world's nations, taking the role of "the children of the world" to describe a vision of a society free of war and hate. It was interpreted as a message of peace addressed to Israel and the Arab countries.On 19 April 1980, the Eurovision Song Contest was held at the Nederlands Congresgebouw in The Hague hosted by Nederlandse Omroep Stichting (NOS). Bensaïd performed "Bitakat Hob" fifth on the night. Jean Claudric conducted the event's orchestra for the entry. At the close of voting, it had received 7 points, all of them from Italy, placing 18th in a field of nineteen, and ahead of perennial last-place recipient Finland.

The country's second-to-last place was a disappointment for RTM, which decided never to participate in the contest again. Bensaïd's career did not suffer, however, as she went on to become one of the leading Arab recording artists of the 20th century. She recorded a French version of the song "Les enfants de l'amitié", found on the B-side of the single and in 1980, Filippos Nikolaou released a Greek cover version "Tosi kardia, tosi agapi" (Greek: "Τόση καρδιά, τόση αγάπη").

"Bitakat Hob" was the first Eurovision song to include Arabic lyrics, and remains the only one sung entirely in Arabic.

Points awarded to Morocco at the Eurovision Song Contest 1980
Score	Country
12 points	
10 points	
8 points	
7 points	Italy
6 points	
5 points	
4 points	
3 points	
2 points	
1 point	

Points awarded by Morocco at the Eurovision Song Contest 1980
Score	Country
12 points	Turkey
10 points	Germany
8 points	United Kingdom
7 points	Switzerland
6 points	Sweden
5 points	Spain
4 points	Norway
3 points	Austria
2 points	Denmark
1 point	France

== Future ==
A second Moroccan broadcaster, 2M TV, has expressed their intention to join the EBU. Should its application be successful, it would be eligible to participate in the contest representing Morocco. In May 2018, Israeli Minister of Communications Ayoob Kara announced his intention to invite countries of the Arab world to participate in the 2019 contest in Tel Aviv, but Morocco was not on the list of participating countries released on 7 November 2018.

Following the signing of the normalization agreement between Israel and Morocco on 10 December 2020, Eran Cicurel, a radio host working at the Israeli Public Broadcasting Corporation (IPBC/Kan), called on Moroccan broadcaster SNRT to return to the contest on his Twitter account, but no response was received.
