= Sverre Kjelsberg =

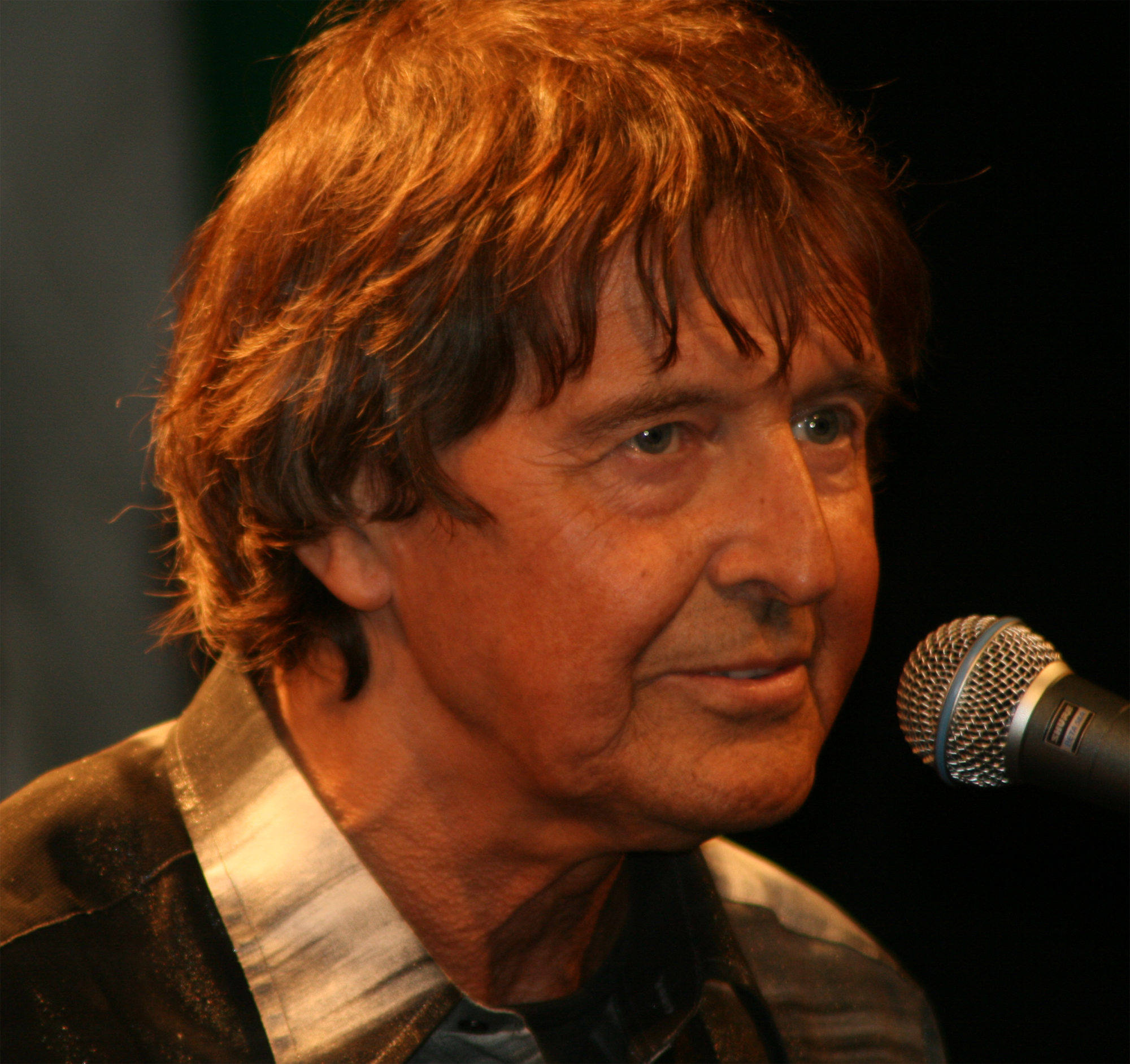
- Kjelsberg in 2009

Background information
- Born: 18 October 1946; Tromsø, Norway
- Died: 18 June 2016 (aged 69); Tromsø, Norway
- Occupations: Singer, Guitarist, Bassist, Composer, Lyricist
- Formerly of: The Pussycats

Sverre Kjelsberg (18 October 1946 – 18 June 2016) was a Norwegian singer, guitarist, bassist, composer, and lyricist. He was a member of the band The Pussycats from 1964. He and Mattis Hætta represented Norway in the Eurovision Song Contest 1980 with the entry "Sámiid ædnan", which was composed by Kjelsberg and Ragnar Olsen.

On 18 June 2016, Kjelsberg was found dead in his home, aged 69. He had been ill with cancer previously, but was declared cancer-free in 2015. No cause of death has been determined.

== Albums ==
- Etter mørketia (MAI, 1979)
- Kära Syster with Tage Löf, Swedish pianist (MAI, 1980). This album included several of Carl Michael Bellman's 1790 Fredman's Epistles including the title track, and the song Sámiid Ædnan.
- Låla! (MAI, 1980) yoik with Mattis Hætta
- Sverre (Hot Line, 1982).
- Den glade pessimisten (OK, 1987), with Ragnar Olsen
- Drømmen e fri (Nord-Norsk Plateselskap, 1994)
- Større kraft enn krutt (2005). Samleplate.
