= Carolin Reiber =

German television presenter

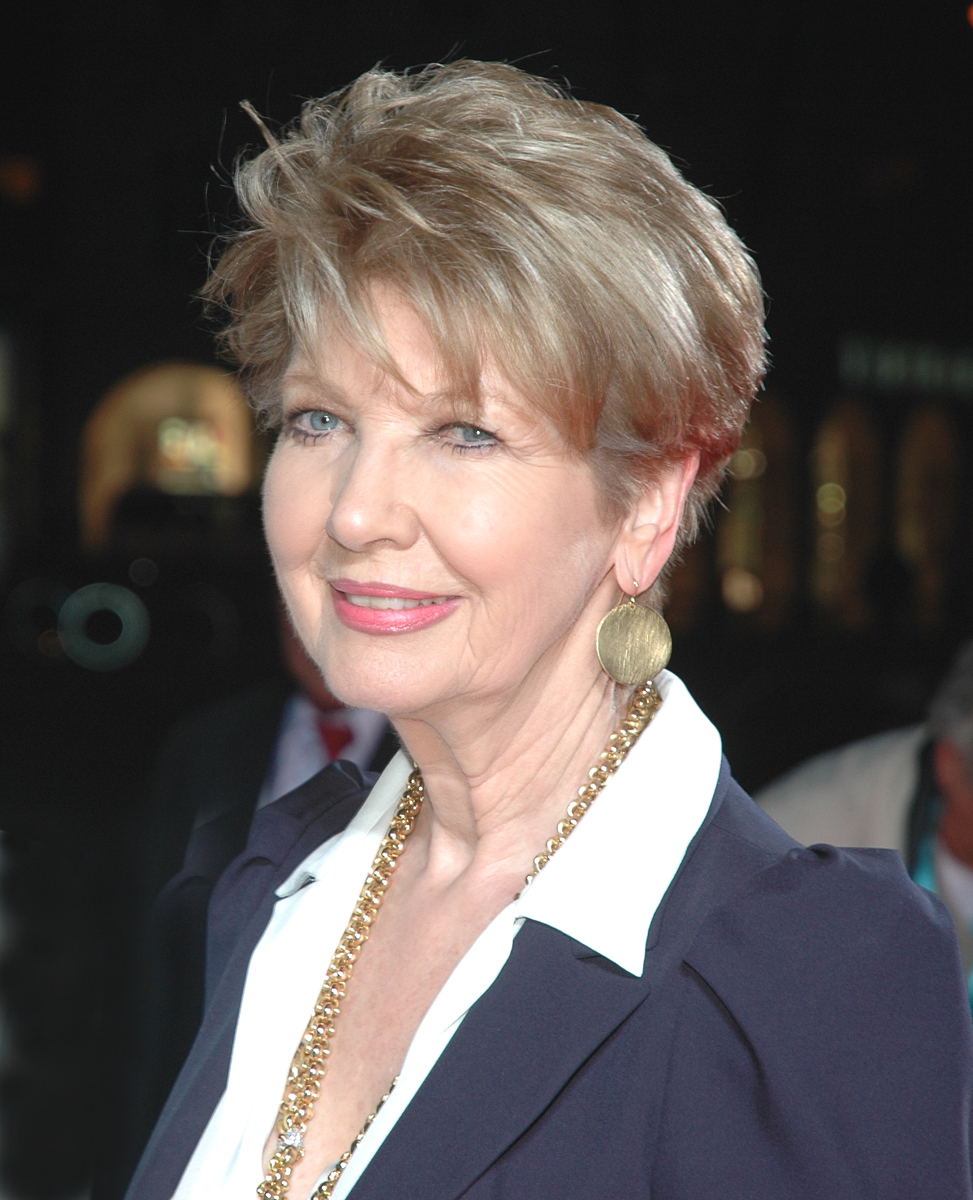
- Reiber in 2014
- Born: November 2, 1940 (age 84)
- Occupation: Television presenter

Carolin Reiber (born 2 November 1940) is a German television presenter.

== Biography ==
Reiber works in Germany as television presenter on German broadcaster ARD and Bayerischer Rundfunk (BR). Television magazines as Jetzt red' i, Unser Land and Die lustigen Musikanten with Maxl Graf were shows with Reiber on German broadcaster BR From 1984 to 1993 she presented on German broadcaster BR magazine Carolins Fleckerlteppich and then from 1993 Bayerntour. On German broadcaster ZDF Reiber presented show Volkstümliche Hitparade and later show Wunschkonzert der Volksmusik. Reiber married Luitpold Maier and has two sons.

== Awards ==
- 1983: Goldene Kamera
- 1987: Bambi
- 1990: Bambi, special award
- 2003: Krone der Volksmusik
