= Mattis Hætta =

Norwegian Sámi singer (1959–2022)

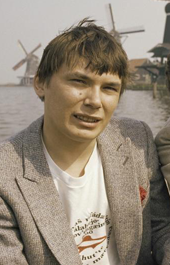

Background information
- Born: 15 March 1959
- Died: 9 November 2022 (aged 63)
- Genres: joik
- Instrument: vocals
- Labels: MIA

Mattis Hætta (15 March 1959 – 9 November 2022) was a Sami singer and recording artist from Norway.

In 1980, he and Sverre Kjelsberg won the 1980 Melodi Grand Prix with the entry "Sámiid ædnan" and went on to represent Norway in the Eurovision Song Contest 1980.

He worked in pantomimes and yoiks in Alta, Kautokeino and Luleå.

Hætta died following a period of illness on 9 November 2022 at the age of 63.

== Discography ==
- Sámiid ædnan/Detsika-visa (MAI EP, 1980)
- Låla (MAI LP, 1981)
