= Papa Pingouin =

1980 song by Sophie & Magaly

Single by Sophie & Magaly
- Language: French
- B-side: "Tous Les Enfants Du Monde"
- Released: 1980
- Length: 3:05
- Label: Jupiter
- Composers: Ralph Siegel; Bernd Meinunger
- Lyricists: Pierre Delanoë; Jean-Paul Cara

Eurovision Song Contest 1980 entry
- Country: Luxembourg
- Artists: Sophie Gilles; Magaly Gilles
- As: Sophie & Magaly
- Language: French
- Composers: Ralph Siegel; Bernd Meinunger
- Lyricists: Pierre Delanoë; Jean-Paul Cara
- Conductor: Norbert Daum

Finals performance
- Final result: 9th
- Final points: 56

Entry chronology
- ◄ "J'ai déjà vu ça dans tes yeux" (1979)
- "C'est peut-être pas l'Amérique" (1981) ►

Official performance video
- "Papa Pingouin" on YouTube

"Papa Pingouin" (French pronunciation: [papa pɛ̃ɡwɛ̃]; "Poppa/Daddy Penguin") is a song recorded by French twin sisters Sophie & Magaly, with music composed by Ralph Siegel and Bernd Meinunger, and lyrics by Pierre Delanoë and Jean-Paul Cara. It represented Luxembourg in the Eurovision Song Contest 1980, held in The Hague.

== Background ==
=== Conception ===
The song was composed by Ralph Siegel and Bernd Meinunger –who are normally associated with Germany as a composer-lyricist combination–, with French lyrics by Pierre Delanoë and Jean-Paul Cara, and was recorded by Sophie & Magaly. It describes the fantasy life of the title character, a bored penguin who imagines flying like a seagull and travelling around the world, listing various places he visits in his imagination. The song ends with the penguin's realisation that life "on the ice floe" is not as bad as he had thought, so he "burns his suitcase" to signify that his desire to travel is over. Sophie & Magaly also recorded the German-language version of the song titled "Papa Pinguin".

=== Eurovision ===
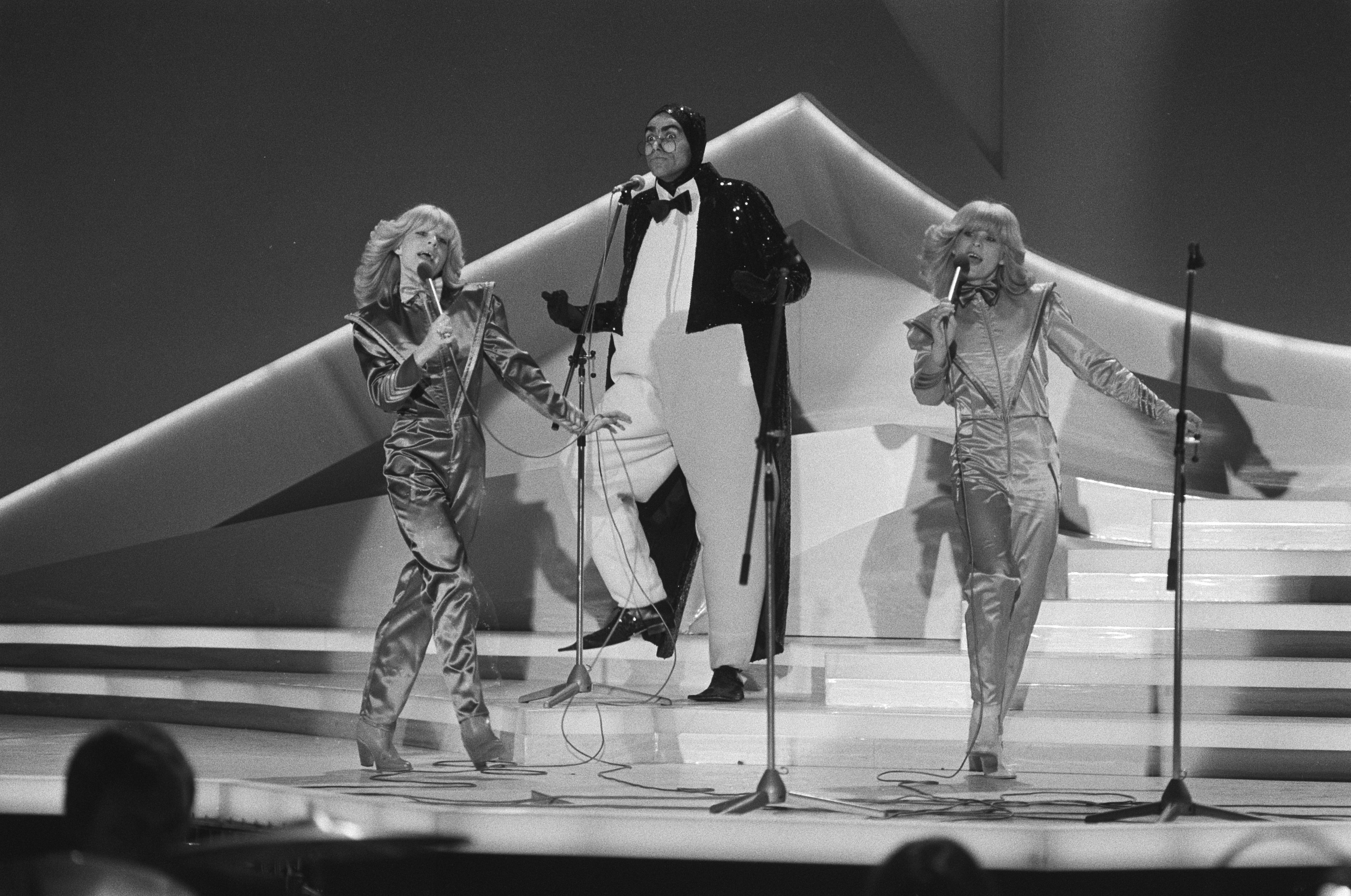
Sophie & Magaly at Eurovision.

The Compagnie Luxembourgeoise de Télédiffusion (CLT) internally selected the song as its entrant for the 25th edition of the Eurovision Song Contest.

On 19 April 1980, the Eurovision Song Contest was held at the Nederlands Congresgebouw in The Hague hosted by Nederlandse Omroep Stichting (NOS), and broadcast live throughout the continent. Sophie & Magaly performed "Papa Pingouin" fourth on the night, following Greece's "Autostop" by Anna Vissi and The Epikouri and preceding Morocco's "Bitaqat Hub" by Samira. Norbert Daum conducted the live orchestra in the performance of the Luxembourgian entry.

By the end of the night, the song had received 56 points, placing ninth out of nineteen entries.

== Charts ==
| Chart (1980) | Peak position |
|---|---|
| France (IFOP) | 18 |

== Pigloo version ==
"Le Papa Pingouin"

Single by Pigloo

from the album La Banquise
- Released: 27 February 2006
- Length: 3:09
- Label: Sony BMG Music
- Composers: Ralph Siegel; Bernd Meinunger
- Lyricists: Pierre Delanoë; Jean-Paul Cara
- Producers: Christophe Berthier; Philippe Kassenbeck

Pigloo singles chronology
| "Le Papa Pingouin" (2006) | "Le Ragga des pingouins" (2006) |

A cover version of the song, performed by animated penguin Pigloo, became a hit in France in 2006, reaching number one on the SNEP Singles Chart for three weeks. The single remained on the chart for twenty-seven weeks, becoming the fifth-best-selling single in France that year. The song also charted on Swiss Singles Chart, where it peaked at number 24. A German version of the song, titled "Papa Pinguin", also charted in German-speaking Europe, reaching number four in Austria and number six in both Germany and Switzerland.

=== Formats and track listings ===
CD single

1. "Le Papa pingouin" — 3:09
2. "Les Manchots et les Pingouins" (instrumental) — 3:12

Digital download

1. "Le Papa pingouin" — 3:09

=== Charts ===
==== Weekly charts ====
"Le Papa Pingouin"

| Chart (2006) | Peak position |
|---|---|
| Belgium (Ultratop 50 Wallonia) | 6 |
| Europe (Eurochart Hot 100) | 5 |
| France (SNEP) | 1 |
| Switzerland (Schweizer Hitparade) | 24 |

"Papa Pinguin"

| Chart (2007) | Peak position |
|---|---|
| Austria (Ö3 Austria Top 40) | 4 |
| Germany (GfK) | 6 |
| Switzerland (Schweizer Hitparade) | 6 |

==== Year-end charts ====
"Le Papa Pingouin"

| Chart (2006) | Position |
|---|---|
| Belgium (Ultratop 50 Wallonia) | 18 |
| Europe (Eurochart Hot 100) | 39 |
| France (SNEP) | 5 |

"Papa Pinguin"

| Chart (2007) | Position |
|---|---|
| Austria (Ö3 Austria Top 40) | 39 |
| Germany (Media Control GfK) | 70 |
| Switzerland (Schweizer Hitparade) | 91 |

=== Certifications and sales ===
| Region | Certification | Certified units/sales |
|---|---|---|
| France (SNEP) | Gold | 292,224 |
