= Non so che darei =

Song by Alan Sorrenti

Single by Alan Sorrenti
- B-side: "If You Need Me Now (English-language version)"
- Released: 1980
- Genre: Pop
- Length: 3:25
- Label: Strand
- Songwriter: Alan Sorrenti
- Producer: Jay Graydon

Alan Sorrenti singles chronology
"Tu sei l'unica donna per me" (1978)	"Non so che darei" (1980)	"La strada brucia" (1981)

Eurovision Song Contest 1980 entry
- Country: Italy
- Artist: Alan Sorrenti
- Language: Italian
- Composer: Alan Sorrenti
- Lyricist: Alan Sorrenti
- Conductor: Del Newman

Finals performance
- Final result: 6th
- Final points: 87

Entry chronology
- ◄ "Raggio di luna" (1979)
- "Per Lucia" (1983) ►

"Non so che darei" ("I don't know what I'd give") was the Italian entry in the Eurovision Song Contest 1980, performed in Italian by Alan Sorrenti.

== Background ==
The song deals with Sorrenti's feelings for his lover. He tells her that he does not know what he would do if he were to lose her and also that he does not know what he would give to stop time and be able to spend the night with her. The song was a massive success in Italy, staying on the first place of the Italian hit parade for over two months, and got Sorrenti a Vota la voce award. Sorrenti also recorded an English-language version of the song with the title "If You Need Me Now".

== At Eurovision ==
The song was performed sixth on the night, following Morocco's Samira Bensaïd with "Bitaqat Hub" and preceding Denmark's Bamses Venner with "Tænker altid på dig". At the close of voting, it had received 87 points, placing 6th in a field of 19.

Italy opted out of the 1981 and 1982 contests, but returned the year after that. Thus, the song was succeeded as Italian representative at the 1983 contest by Riccardo Fogli with "Per Lucia".

== Charts ==
Chart (1980)	Peak position
Austria (Ö3 Austria Top 40)	14
Belgium (Ultratop 50 Flanders)	21
Italy (Musica e dischi)	1
Norway (VG-lista)	5
Sweden (Sverigetopplistan)	5
Switzerland (Schweizer Hitparade)	3
West Germany (Official German Charts)	22
