= Lio (album) =

Studio album by Lio
- Released: 1980
- Recorded: 1979–80
- Genre: Pop punk; bubblegum pop; new wave
- Label: Ariola (Benelux); Arabella (France); Warner Music Group; Ze Records
- Producer: Jacno; Dan Lacksman; Marc Moulin

Lio chronology
Lio (1980)	Suite sixtine (1982)

Singles from Lio
- 1. "Le Banana Split" Released: 1979; 2. "Amoureux solitaires" Released: 1980; 3. "Amicalement votre" Released: 1980

Professional ratings
Review scores
Source	Rating
AllMusic	3.5/5 stars

Lio, also known as Premier Album, is the debut album by the French-Belgian pop singer Lio. It features the hit singles "Amoureux solitaires", "Amicalement votre" and her signature song "Le Banana Split".

== Singles ==
Release date	Single	Sales Figures	Peak positions
1979	"Le Banana Split"	700,000	#1 FRA
1980	"Amoureux solitaires"	964,000	#1 FRA, #1 ITA, #10 AUT, #11, GER
1980	"Amicalement votre"		#19 FRA, #59 GER

== Re-issues ==
The album was originally released by the record company Ariola (Benelux and Spain), and Arabella (France) in 1980. It was re-released by Warner Music Group in 1996. Finally, a second re-issue by Ze Records followed in 2005 with four bonus tracks, including the extended version of the main hit single "Le Banana Split", "Teenager" (the b-side of "Le Banana Split") and the Spanish version of the single "Amoureux solitaires".

== Track listing ==
All tracks are written by Jacques Duvall / Jay Alanski except where noted.

Original Album
No.	Title	Writer(s)	Length
1.	"Amicalement Votre"		2:44
2.	"J'obtiens toujours tout ce que je veux"		2:33
3.	"Comix Discomix"		3:36
4.	"La panthère rose"		2:35
5.	"You Go To My Head"	Haven Gillespie / J. Fred Coots	3:39
6.	"Amoureux solitaires"	Elli Medeiros / Jacno / Jacques Duvall (translation - uncredited)	3:25
7.	"Si belle et inutile"		2:54
8.	"Bébé vampire"		2:40
9.	"Speedy Gonzales"		3:14
10.	"La petite amazone"		3:13
11.	"Le Banana Split"		2:31
12.	"Oz"		2:17

Bonus Tracks (on ZE Records 2005 re-release)
No.	Title	Writer(s)	Length
1.	"Teenager"		5:23
2.	"Je ne sais pas dire oui"	Jacques Duvall / Marc Moulin	4:37
3.	"Amantes Solitarios"		4:00
4.	"Le Banana Split (Version Longue 1979)"		6:19

According to Lio's autobiography Pop Model, it was her lyricist Jacques Duvall who translated the lyrics of "Lonely Lovers", the original English-language song by French punk band Stinky Toys which became "Amoureux solitaires". However, if composer-guitarist Jacno approved the cover, singer-lyricist Elli Medeiros didn't. In the end, Duvall couldn't have his name in the official credits of the song and didn't get any royalties for it.

== Personnel ==
- Coordinator [Reissue Co-ordination], Liner Notes, Design [Digipak & Booklet Design] – Michel Esteban
- Design [Original Art Cover Design] – Marc Borgers
- Photography [Photos Booklet] – Guido Marco
- Producer – Dan Lacksman (tracks: 1 to 5, 7 to 16), Marc Moulin (tracks: 1 to 5, 7 to 16)
- Recorded By – Alan Ward
- Remastered By – Charlus de la Salle

== Charts ==
Chart (2013)	Peak position
French SNEP Albums Chart	9

== Certifications ==
Region	Sales (1980)
France	150,000

== B-sides ==
Song	Single
"Teenager"	"Le Banana Split"/7" vinyl (Belgium & France)
"Le Banana Split (Long Disco Version)"	"Le Banana Split"/12" maxi vinyl (Belgium & France)
"Marie Antoinette" (English Version of "Le Banana Split")	"Le Banana Split"/7" vinyl (UK)
"Petite amazone"	"Amoureux solitaires"/7" vinyl
"Speedy Gonzales"	"Amoureux solitaires"/7" vinyl (Canada)
"Si belle et inutile"	"Amicalement votre"/7" vinyl (France, Germany & Netherlands)
"You Go To My Head"	"Amicalement votre"/7" vinyl (Japan)
