= Hits! (Kim Kay album) =

Compilation album by Kim Kay
- Released: 20 November 2000
- Recorded: 2000
- Studio: Electric City
- Genre: Eurodance
- Length: 56:10
- Language: French
- Label: EMI
- Producer: Phil Sterman; Lov Cook

Kim Kay chronology
| La Vie en lilali (1998) | Hits! (2000) |

Singles from Hits!
- 1. "La Dah-li-danse" Released: 2000; 2. "Les Vacances d'été" Released: 2000; 3. "Ça plane pour moi" Released: 2000; 4. "Les Sucettes" Released: 2000

Hits! is the only compilation album by the Belgian Eurodance singer Kim Kay, released on 20 November 2000. The album was produced by Phil Sterman and Lov Cook and was recorded at Electric City. It features the artist's singles: "La Dah-li-danse", "Les Vacances d'été", "Ça plane pour moi", and "Les Sucettes".

Some of the songs from Kim Kay's previous debut album La Vie en lilali are retained from the Hits!.

== Track listing ==
| No. | Title | Writer(s) | Length |
|---|---|---|---|
| 1. | "Les Sucettes" | Serge Gainsbourg | 3:26 |
| 2. | "Bam bam" | Peter Gillis; Miguel Wiels; Stef Corbesier | 3:30 |
| 3. | "Hula hop" | Jean-Luc Renders; Bernard Loncheval; Peter Lacy | 2:53 |
| 4. | "Poupée de cire, poupée de son" | S. Gainsbourg | 2:18 |
| 5. | "Les Vacances d'été" | Traditional - O Mal Hão; French adapt.: Véronique Loiselet | 3:11 |
| 6. | "Touche à tout" | John Terra; Wim Claes; S. Corbesier; Lou Deprijck | 3:05 |
| 7. | "Ça plane pour moi" | Yvan Lacomblez; Lou Deprijck | 3:10 |
| 8. | "Oui oh oui" | W. Claes; Katrien Gillis; Guido Veulemans | 2:50 |
| 9. | "Le Banana Split" | Jacques Duvall; Jay Alanski | 2:47 |
| 10. | "La Dah-li-danse" | Traditional - In dulci jubilo; French adapt.: G. Stevens, Ilbe, Sidro | 3:23 |
| 11. | "Iniminimanimo" | Sidro; Ilbe; S. Corbesier | 3:33 |
| 12. | "Lilali" | G. Veulemans; W. Claes; K. Gillis | 3:20 |
| 13. | "Bam bam" (speedgarage mix) | P. Gillis; M. Wiels; S. Corbesier | 6:02 |
| 14. | "Poupée de cire, poupée de son" (club mix) | S. Gainsbourg | 3:43 |
| 15. | "La Dah-li-danse" (dolly family mix) | Traditional - In dulci jubilo; French adapt.: G. Stevens, Ilbe, Sidro | 5:39 |
| 16. | "Lilali" (mellow mix) | G. Veulemans; W. Claes; K. Gillis | 3:20 |
| Total length: | | | 56:10 |
