= Bam =

Bam or BAM may refer to:

== Places ==
=== Extraterrestrial ===
- Bam (crater), a crater on Mars
- 2031 BAM, an asteroid

=== Terrestrial ===
- Bam (neighborhood), Tirana, Albania
- Bam, Amur Oblast, a rural locality in Amur Oblast, Russia
- Bam, Esfarayen, a village in Esfarayen County, North Khorasan Province, Iran
- Bam, Iran, a city in Kerman Province, Iran
- Arg-e Bam, an ancient citadel destroyed by an earthquake in 2003 in Kerman Province, Iran
- Bam, Jajrom, a village in Jajrom County, North Khorasan Province, Iran
- Bam County, an administrative subdivision of Iran
- Bam Province, Burkina Faso
- Bam Rural District, an administrative subdivision of Iran
- Lake Bam, Burkina Faso
- Bam Island (Papua New Guinea), in the Schouten Islands

== People ==
- Bam (nickname)
- Bam (surname)

== Arts, entertainment, and media ==
=== Music ===
- BAM, an alternative name for the British duo Bars and Melody
- BAM! Volume 1, an album by Sister Hazel
- Bam (song), a song by Jay-Z featuring Damian Marley
- "Bam", a song by Atmosphere from the album You Can't Imagine How Much Fun We're Having
- "BAM", a song by Miranda Cosgrove from the album Sparks Fly

=== Other arts, entertainment, and media ===
- BAM (film), a 2015 animated short by Howie Shia
- BAM (magazine) (Bay Area Music), a defunct San Francisco music magazine (1976–1999)
- BAM, a form of scoring in duplicate contract bridge; see Glossary of contract bridge terms#board-a-match
- Bianca Montgomery and Maggie Stone (BaM), characters on the soap opera All My Children
- Big Ass Monster, used to describe tougher than normal computer-controlled video game opponents, notably in TERA
- Black Arts Movement in America, 1970s
- Black American music, an umbrella term for music developed by African-Americans, especially jazz
- MLB Advanced Media (MLBAM), a streaming service of Major League Baseball
- Radio Bam, a Sirius radio station from 2004 to 2013

== Brands and enterprises ==
- BAM! Entertainment, a dormant video game publisher founded in 1999
- Banca Agricola Mantovana, a defunct Italian bank
- Books-A-Million or BAM!, an American book retailer
- Bricks & Minifigs, an American third-party Lego retail chain
- Brookfield Asset Management, a Canadian financial services company
- Royal BAM Group, a Dutch-based construction corporation
- BAM Nuttall, a British construction subsidiary of Royal BAM Group

== Languages ==
- bam, ISO 639-2 and 630-3 code for the Bambara language, spoken in Mali
- Bam or Biem language, spoken in New Guinea
- Bam, a dialect of the Wantoat language, spoken in Papua New Guinea

== Organizations ==
=== Arts and entertainment ===
- Baluchi Autonomist Movement, a Baluchi ethnic nationalist group
- BAM Racing, a NASCAR racing team
- Berkeley Art Museum and Pacific Film Archive (BAM/PFA), Berkeley, California, United States
- Boise Art Museum in Boise, Idaho
- Brooklyn Academy of Music, a performing arts venue in New York City
- Brotherhood of Auckland Magicians (BAM), a New Zealand-based non-for-profit organisation and magic club

=== Other organizations ===
- Bishop Abraham Memorial College, Thurithicadu, Kerala, India
- Born Again Movement, or Zhongshengpai, a Chinese Christian religious movement
- Bundesanstalt für Materialforschung und -prüfung, Federal Institute for Materials Research and Testing, Berlin

=== Sports federation ===
- Badminton Association of Malaysia, governing body of badminton in Malaysia

== Science and technology ==
=== Biology ===
- Populus balsamifera, also known as Bam, the balsam poplar

=== Computing ===
- Bidirectional associative memory, a type of neural network
- Block availability map, a computer file system of Commodore DOS
- BOINC Account Manager (BAM!) for Berkeley Open Infrastructure for Network Computing software
- Binary angular measurement, a digital representation of angles used by computers

=== Medicine ===
- Bile acid malabsorption, a gut-related problem
- Bosma arhinia microphthalmia, an extremely rare genetic disorder in which both arhinia and microphthalmia are present
- Bamlanivimab, an experimental antibody treatment for COVID-19

=== Other science and technology ===
- BAM, a ceramic alloy, aluminium magnesium boride
- Beta attenuation monitoring, for measurement of particle content in gas flow
- Binary Alignment Map, the comprehensive raw data from genome sequencing (includes BAM files and the BAM file format)
- Brewster angle microscope, for studying thin films on liquid surfaces.

== Transport ==
- BAM, station code for Bamford railway station, Bamford, Derbyshire, England
- BAM, IATA and FAA LID codes for Battle Mountain Airport, Nevada, US
- Baikal–Amur Mainline, a Siberian railway line
- Bière–Apples–Morges railway, a railway company in Switzerland
- Buque de Acción Marítima, offshore patrol vessels of the Spanish Navy

== Other uses ==
- BAM, Bosnia and Herzegovina convertible mark by ISO 4217 currency code

== See also ==
- Bam Bam (disambiguation)
- Bang (disambiguation)
- Boom (disambiguation)
- Emeril Lagasse, known for his catchphrase "BAM!"
- "Baam", a song by Momoland
