= Les Vacances d'été =

Single by Kim Kay

from the album Hits!
- Released: 2000
- Recorded: 2000 at Sterman & Cook Studio
- Genre: Eurodance
- Length: 3:11
- Label: EMI
- Songwriters: Traditional - O Mal Hão; Véronique Loiselet
- Producers: Phil Sterman; Lov Cook

Kim Kay singles chronology
"La Dah-li-danse" (2000)	"Les Vacances d'été" (2000)	"Ça plane pour moi" (2000)

Music video
- "Les Vacances d'été" on YouTube

"Les Vacances d'été ("The Summer Vacations") " is a song by the Belgian Eurodance singer Kim Kay. It was released in 2000 on EMI as the second single and as well as the fifth track from her only compilation album, Hits! (2000). It is a Eurodance song that was originally written by traditional "O Mal Hão" and its French adaptation written by Véronique Loiselet and produced by Phil Sterman and Lov Cook.

== Track listing ==
No.	Title	Writer(s)	Length
1.	"Les Vacances d'été"	Traditional - O Mal Hão; French adapt.: Véronique Loiselet	3:11

Medley
No.	Title	Writer(s)	Length
1.	"Lilali"	Wim Claes; Katrien Gillis; Guido Veulemans
2.	"Oui oh oui"	W. Claes; K. Gillis; G. Veulemans
3.	"Poupée de cire, poupée de son"	Serge Gainsbourg
Total length:			3:59

== Charts ==
Chart (2000)	Peak position
Belgium (Ultratop 50 Flanders)	38
