= Sex (Telex album) =

Studio album by Telex
- Released: 1981
- Recorded: Telex Sound Studio
- Genre: Synth-pop; new wave; post-disco; electro
- Label: RKM; Ariola; Disques Vogue
- Producer: Telex

Telex chronology
Neurovision (1980)	Sex (1981)	Wonderful World (1984)

Sex (alternately released as Birds and Bees) is the third studio album by Belgian electronic group Telex, released in 1981. The album is notable for being the first collaboration between Telex and American pop group Sparks.

== Production ==
Marc Moulin and Dan Lacksman were introduced to Ron Mael and Russell Mael of Sparks by their mutual friend, Lio. Facing pressures to release an album in English, Moulin extended an offer to the Maels to contribute lyrics to their upcoming LP. This prompted a long-term friendship between the two bands, and led directly to Lacksman's assistance with production of the 1983 album In Outer Space and 1986's Music That You Can Dance To.

Due to concerns about censors and the album's title, the album was released in the UK as Birds and Bees (the phrase "the birds and the bees" is often used as a euphemism for "sex", especially by parents explaining to their children what it is).

== Track listing ==
=== Original ===
All lyrics are written by Ron Mael; all music is composed by Michel Moers.

No.	Title	Length
1.	"Brainwash"	4:23
2.	"Drama, Drama"	3:58
3.	"Haven't We Met Somewhere Before"	3:37
4.	"Long Holiday"	2:13
5.	"The Man With the Answer"	3:14
6.	"Carbon Copy"	6:33
7.	"Exercise Is Good for You"	3:36
8.	"Dream-O-Mat"	4:15
9.	"Sigmund Freud's Party"	2:54

The 2023 Mute Records reissue inserts "Dummy" between tracks 8 and 9.

=== Birds and Bees 1982 release ===
No.	Title	Length
1.	"Mata Hari"
2.	"Dummy"
3.	"Haven't We Met Somewhere Before"
4.	"Drama Drama"
5.	"Brainwash"
6.	"L'Amour Toujours"
7.	"Dream-O-Mat"
8.	"Carbon Copy"
9.	"The Man with the Answer"
