= Bam (surname) =

Bam is a surname. Notable people with the surname include:

- Bhuvan Bam (born 1994), Indian YouTuber, comedian, and singer
- Brigalia Bam (born 1933), Anglican women's and social activist and writer
- Chakra Bam (born 1997), Nepalese singer
- Marvin Bam (born 1977), South African field hockey player
- Melinda Bam (born 1989), Miss South Africa 2011
- Mohan Bam (born 1991), Nepalese judoka
- Ranti Bam (born 1982), British-Nigerian artist

== See also ==
- Bam (disambiguation)
- Bam (nickname)
