= Suite sixtine =

Compilation album by Lio
- Released: 1982
- Genre: Pop, new wave
- Label: Attic Records; Ze Records
- Producer: Dan Lacksman; Marc Moulin; Sparks

Lio chronology
Lio (1980)	Suite sixtine (1982)	Amour toujours (1983)

Singles from Suite sixtine
- 1. "Sage comme une image" Released: 1982; 2. "Mona Lisa" Released: 1982

Professional ratings
Review scores
Source	Rating
AllMusic	4/5 stars

Suite sixtine is the first compilation album by the Belgian pop singer Lio. It was released exclusively for Canada in 1982, by Attic Records. Ze Records reissued the album for France in 2005.

== Singles ==
Release date	Single
1982	"Sage comme une image"
1982	"Mona Lisa"

== Release information and re-issues ==
The album was originally released exclusively to the Canadian market. A Japanese release followed in 1996. Finally, it was released in France in 2005 as part of Ze Records's reissue of Lio's discography; this re-issue has four bonus tracks, including the extended version of the single "Sage comme une image".

== Track listing ==
All tracks are written by Jacques Duvall / Jay Alanski except where noted.

Original Album
No.	Title	Writer(s)	Length
1.	"Suite sixtine"		2:40
2.	"Mona Lisa"		2:58
3.	"Sage comme une image"
4.	"Baby Lou"	Alain Chamfort; Michel Pelay; Serge Gainsbourg	4:09
5.	"I'll Expose You"	Ron & Russell Mael (English Adaptation)	2:58
6.	"Marie Antoinette"	Ron & Russell Mael (English Adaptation)
7.	"My Top Twenty"	Ron & Russell Mael (English Adaptation)	3:31
8.	"Party For Two"	Ron & Russell Mael (English Adaptation)	3:14
9.	"Housewife of the Year"	Ron & Russell Mael (English Adaptation)	2:19
10.	"Clothes"	Ron & Russell Mael (English Adaptation)

Bonus Tracks (on ZE Records 2005 re-release)
No.	Title	Writer(s)	Length
1.	"I Graduate"	Ron & Russell Mael (English Adaptation)
2.	"Ali"	Ron & Russell Mael (English Adaptation)
3.	"Baby You're Weird"	Ron & Russell Mael (English Adaptation)	2:41
4.	"South of the Border"	Ron & Russell Mael (English Adaptation)	3:15
5.	"Sage comme une image (Long Version)"		6:08

== Personnel ==
- Liner Notes, Design [Digipack & Booklet Design] – Michel Esteban
- Photography By [Front Cover] – Jean-Baptiste Mondino
- Recorded By – Alan Ward
- Remastered By – Charlus de la Salle
