= Amoureux solitaires =

Single by Lio

from the album Lio
- Released: 1980
- Genre: Bubblegum pop
- Length: 3:35
- Label: Ariola; Arabella
- Songwriters: Jacno; Elli Medeiros
- Producer: Jacno

Lio singles chronology
"Le Banana Split" (1979)	"Amoureux solitaires" (1980)	"Amicalement votre" (1980)

Music video
- "Amoureux solitaires" (TopPop) on YouTube

"Amoureux solitaires" (pronounced [amuʁø sɔlitɛːʁ]; French for 'Lonely lovers') is a song by the Belgian pop singer Lio. It was released in 1980 on Ariola and Arabella Records as the second single as well as the sixth track from her debut eponymous debut studio album. It is a bubblegum pop song that was written by Elli Medeiros and Jacno and produced by the latter. It also reached the No. 1 slot on the Italian charts for two weeks.

== Track listing ==
1. "Amoureux solitaires"
2. "La petite amazone"

== Charts ==
=== Weekly charts ===
Chart (1981)	Peak position
Austria (Ö3 Austria Top 40)	6
Belgium (Ultratop 50 Flanders)	14
France (IFOP)	1
Italy (FIMI)	1
Netherlands (Dutch Top 40)	3
Netherlands (Single Top 100)	4
Spain (AFYVE)	2
Switzerland (Sonntagsblick Hitparade)	20
West Germany (GfK)	11

=== Year-end charts ===
Chart (1981)	Position
Italy (FIMI)	4
Netherlands (Dutch Top 40)	21
Netherlands (Single Top 100)	51
West Germany (Official German Charts)	46

== Cover versions ==
- The Brazilian singer Sol recorded a Portuguese-language version titled "Meu gatinho" ('My kitten') that was released in 1981, as her debut single, in Brazil.
- The song was recorded by Kim Kay on her debut studio album La Vie en lilali (1998).
- It was covered by Quebec band Les Breastfeeders on their 2004 album Déjeuner sur l'herbe.
