= Euro-Vision =

1980 single by Telex

Single by Telex

from the album Neurovision
- B-side: "Troppical"
- Released: 1980
- Genre: Synth-pop
- Label: Vogue; RKM; Sire
- Songwriters: Michel Moers; Dan Lacksman; Marc Moulin
- Producer: Telex

Telex singles chronology
"Rock Around the Clock" (1979)	"Euro-Vision" (1980)	"We Are All Getting Old" (1980)

Eurovision Song Contest 1980 entry
- Country: Belgium
- Artists: Michel Moers, Dan Lacksman, Marc Moulin
- As: Telex
- Language: French
- Composers: Michel Moers, Dan Lacksman, Marc Moulin
- Lyricists: Michel Moers, Dan Lacksman, Marc Moulin

Finals performance
- Final result: 17th
- Final points: 14

Entry chronology
- ◄ "Hey Nana" (1979)
- "Samson" (1981) ►

"Euro-Vision" (French pronunciation: [øʁo vizjɔ̃]) was the Belgian entry in the Eurovision Song Contest 1980, performed in French by Telex. It received 14 points, placing it 17th in a field of 19. Lead singer Michel Moers said "We had hoped to finish last, but Portugal decided otherwise. We got ten points from them and finished on the 19th [sic] spot".

The song was the first entry ever to mention the contest by name as part of what is generally agreed to have been a send-up of the whole event (previous entries such as Schmetterlinge's "Boom Boom Boomerang" had parodied the contest without actually naming it). Further, in contrast to the generally upbeat and lively entries submitted from other entrants, Telex performed from behind synthesisers and in a robotic manner.

Telex released the song in French and English language versions and subsequently re-recorded the track (as "(N)eurovision") for their first 'greatest hits' compilation More than Distance.
