= La Vie en lilali =

Studio album by Kim Kay
- Released: 20 November 1998
- Recorded: 1998
- Genre: Eurodance
- Length: 43:54
- Language: French
- Label: EMI
- Producers: Phil Sterman; Lov Cook

Kim Kay chronology
La Vie en lilali (1998)	Hits! (2000)

Singles from La Vie en lilali
- 1. "Lilali" Released: 1998; 2. "Oui oh oui" Released: 1998; 3. "Poupée de cire, poupée de son" Released: 1998; 4. "Bam bam" Released: 1999; 5. "Iniminimanimo" Released: 1999

Professional ratings
Review scores
Source	Rating
Swiss Hitparade	2.5/6 stars
Muzikum	8/10

La Vie en lilali is the debut studio album by the Belgian Eurodance singer Kim Kay, released on 20 November 1998. The album was produced by Phil Sterman and Lov Cook. It features the artist's singles: "Oui oh oui", "Poupée de cire, poupée de son", "Bam bam", "Iniminimanimo", and perhaps the artist's most well-known hit, "Lilali".

== Track listing ==
No.	Title	Writer(s)	Length
1.	"Lilali"	Guido Veulemans; Wim Claes; Katrien Gillis	3:23
2.	"Bam bam"	Peter Gillis; Miguel Wiels; Stef Corbesier	3:30
3.	"Le Banana Split"	Jacques Duvall; Jay Alanski	2:47
4.	"Iniminimanimo"	Sidro; Ilbe; S. Corbesier	3:33
5.	"Donne-moi"	P. Gillis; M. Wiels; Véronique Loiselet	3:42
6.	"Oui oh oui"	W. Claes; K. Gillis; G. Veulemans	2:51
7.	"Tout simplement"	John Terra; Ilbe; V. Loiselet	3:37
8.	"Amoureux solitaires"	Elli Medeiros; Jacno	3:16
9.	"À nous"	Sidro; Ilbe; V. Loiselet	2:57
10.	"99 Luftballons"	Carlo Karges; Jörn-Uwe Fahrenkrog-Petersen	3:28
11.	"Je danse"	Sidro; Ilbe; S. Corbesier	3:05
12.	"Poupée de cire, poupée de son" (remix)	Serge Gainsbourg	2:41
13.	"Lilali" (speedgarage mix)	G. Veulemans; W. Claes; K. Gillis	5:04
Total length:			43:54
