= Amour toujours =

Studio album by Lio
- Released: 1983
- Genres: Pop; Chanson; Disco
- Labels: Ariola; ZE
- Producer: Alain Chamfort

Lio chronology
Suite sixtine (1982)	Amour toujours (1983)	Pop model (1986)

Singles from Amour toujours
- 1. "Zip a doo wah" Released: 1983; 2. "La reine des pommes" Released: 1982; 3. "Tétéou (Lio featuring Jacky) (on 2005 re-release only)" Released: 1985

Professional ratings
Review scores
Source	Rating
AllMusic	3.5/5 stars

Amour toujours is the second studio album by the Belgian pop singer Lio and her third LP overall.

== Singles ==
Release date	Single	Chart Position
1983	"Zip a doo wah"	
1983	"La reine des pommes"	
1983	"Tétéou" (Featuring Jacky)	#48 FRA

== Release information and re-issues ==
The album was originally released by Ariola Records in 1983. It was re-released in France in 2005 as part of ZE Records's reissue of Lio's discography. This re-issue has four bonus tracks, including the extended version of the single "Zip a doo wah" and the standalone Top 50 hit "Tétéou".

== Track listing ==
All lyrics are written by Jacques Duvall, except where noted; all music is composed by Alain Chamfort, except where noted.

Original Album
No.	Title	Lyrics	Music	Length
1.	"La Reine des pommes"
2.	"La Vérité toute nue"		Jay Alanski
3.	"Zip a doo wah"
4.	"Grenade"
5.	"Trou de mémoire"		Jay Alanski
6.	"Je voudrais bien me sentir mal"		Jay Alanski
7.	"J'aime un fantome"		Marc Moulin
8.	"Motus a la muette"
9.	"Plus je t'embrasse"		Ben Ryan
10.	"Je m'ennuie de toi"	Pierre Grosz

Bonus Tracks (on ZE Records 2005 re-release)
No.	Title	Lyrics	Music	Length
1.	"Zip a doo wah (Long Version)"
2.	"Noël"		Jay Alanski
3.	"Por Quem Sonha Anamaria"	Juca Chavez	Juca Chavez
4.	"Sleighride"	Man Parrish	Leroy Anderson
5.	"Tétéou (featuring Jacky)"	Boris Bergman

== Personnel ==
- Arranged by – Alain Chamfort (tracks: 15), Bruno Coulais (tracks: 1, 4, 6 to 8), Dan Lacksman (tracks: 9), John Sulznick (tracks: 9), Marc Moulin (tracks: 9, 15), Slim Pezin (tracks: 2, 3, 5, 10)
- Artwork by [original art cover design] – Marc Borgers
- Engineer – Ryan Ulyate
- Mastered by [digitally remastered by] – Charlus de la Salle
- Photography – Robert Doisneau
- Fairlight programming – John Kongos
- Supervised by [reissue co-ordinated & produced by] – Michel Esteban
