= Electronic Systems =

Electronic Systems may refer to:

- Electronics and related technologies
  - Electrical element
  - Electrical network
  - Electronic system-level design and verification

== Organizations ==
- Goodrich Electronic Systems, a division of the Goodrich Corporation
- Marconi Electronic Systems, a former business of General Electric; now part of BAE Systems
- Northrop Grumman Electronic Systems
- Electronic Systems, a former business of Raytheon
- Electronic Systems Center, a unit of the United States Air Force located at Hanscom AFB

== See also ==
- Electronic System, a Belgian musical group
