= Pop model =

Studio album by Lio
- Released: 1986
- Genre: Pop
- Label: Arabella; Polydor; Warner Music; ZE
- Producer: Michel Esteban; Alain Chamfort; Marc Moulin; John Cale

Lio chronology
Amour toujours (1983)	Pop model (1986)	Can can (1988)

Singles from Pop model
- 1. "Les brunes comptent pas pour des prunes" Released: 1986; 2. "Fallait pas commencer" Released: 1987; 3. "Je casse tout ce que je touche" Released: 1987; 4. "Chauffeur suivez cette voiture" Released: 1987

Professional ratings
Review scores
Source	Rating
AllMusic	4/5 stars

Pop model is Belgian pop singer Lio's third studio album of entirely new material and fourth album overall. It features two of her biggest hits: "Les brunes comptent pas pour des prunes" and "Fallait pas commencer". It is her second best-selling album and was certified gold in France.

== Background ==
Pop model was released after the failure of her previous album, Amour toujours. Between the two albums, Lio teamed up with French TV presenter Jacky and scored a Top 50 hit with the single "Tétèoù?", written and produced by her then-boyfriend, singer-songwriter Alain Chamfort.
According to Lio's autobiography, Alain Chamfort worked on the production of the lead single "Les brunes comptent pas pour des prunes" as a "breakup gift".

== Singles ==
Release date	Single	Sales Figures	Peak positions
1986	"Les brunes comptent pas pour des prunes"	250,000+	#10 FRA
1987	"Fallait pas commencer"	355,000	#5 FRA
1987	"Je casse tout ce que je touche"	90,000+	#22 FRA
1987	"Chauffeur suivez cette voiture"	20,000	

== Re-Issues ==
The album was originally released by the record company Polydor in 1986.

It was re-released by Ze Records in 2005 with four bonus tracks, including a cover of T. Rex's "Hot Love", the English version of "Les brunes comptent pas pour des prunes" and the extended versions of many songs.

The album will be reissued in July 2026 by Universal Music France on red vinyl, yellow vinyl and picture disc in celebration of its 40th anniversary and girl power.

== Track listing ==
All tracks are written by Jacques Duvall & Jay Alanski except where noted.

Original Album
No.	Title	Writer(s)	Producer(s)	Length
1.	"Pop song"		Michel Esteban	3:21
2.	"Je casse tout ce que je touche"		Esteban	3:52
3.	"Les deux pour le prix d'une"		Esteban	2:40
4.	"Les filles veulent tout"	Guillaume Israël; Isabelle Fasy	Esteban	3:36
5.	"Dallas"		John Cale	3:53
6.	"Les brunes comptent pas pour des prunes"	Duvall / Marc Moulin	Esteban; Alain Chamfort; Marc Moulin	3:05
7.	"Fallait pas commencer"		Esteban	3:57
8.	"Veste du soir"	Israël; Fasy	Cale	3:46
9.	"Barbie"		Cale	3:47
10.	"Chauffeur suivez cette voiture"		Esteban	3:23

Bonus tracks (on ZE Records 2005 re-release)
No.	Title	Writer(s)	Producer(s)	Length
11.	"Hot Love"	Marc Bolan	Esteban; Chamfort; Moulin	3:36
12.	"Brunettes Are No Puppets"	Duvall / Marc Moulin	Esteban; Chamfort; Moulin	3:09
13.	"Les Deux Pour Le Prix D'Une (Long Version Club)"		Esteban	5:10
14.	"Les Brunes Comptent Pas Pour Des Prunes (Long Version Club)"		Esteban; Chamfort; Moulin	4:48
15.	"Fallait Pas Commencer (Long Version Club)"		Esteban	5:02
16.	"Je Casse Tout Ce Que Je Touche (Long Version Club)"		Esteban	5:11
17.	"Chauffeur, Sauvez Cette Voiture (Long Version Club)"		Esteban	5:02
18.	"Barbie (Alternative Mix No Drum)"		Cale	3:48

== Personnel ==
- Backing vocals [additional] – Helena Noguerra
- Backing vocals, arranged by [backing vocals] – Sylvaine Bordy
- Bass – Marc Navez
- Cello – David Shamban
- Drums – Gilbert Levy, Philippe Draï (tracks: 6, 12, 14)
- Guitar – Vincent Palmer (tracks: 6, 12, 14)
- Guitar, arranged by [horns] – Yann Lecker
- Keyboards, arranged by [strings] – John Cale
- Percussion – Marcal Filho
- Producer – Alain Chamfort (tracks: 6, 12, 14), John Cale (tracks: 5, 8, 10, 18), Marc Moulin (tracks: 6, 12, 14), Michel Esteban
- Saxophone – Spider Mittleman
- Synthesizer, mixed by – Steven Stanley
- Trumpet – Dale Turner
- Viola – Peter Hatch
- Violin – Edith S. Shayne, Henri Ferber*, Michael Markman

== Certifications ==
Region	Certification
France	Gold (100,000)
