= La Dah-li-danse =

Single by Kim Kay

from the album Hits!
- Released: 2000
- Recorded: 2000 at Sterman & Cook Studio
- Genre: Eurodance
- Length: 3:23
- Label: EMI
- Songwriters: Traditional - In dulci jubilo; Ilbe; Sidro; G. Stevens
- Producers: Phil Sterman; Lov Cook

Kim Kay singles chronology
"Iniminimanimo" (1999)	"La Dah-li-danse" (2000)	"Les Vacances d'été" (2000)

Music video
- "La Dah-li-danse" on YouTube

"La Dah-li-danse" is a song by the Belgian Eurodance singer Kim Kay. It was released in 2000 on EMI as the lead single and as well as the tenth track from her only compilation album, Hits! (2000). It is a Eurodance song that was originally written by traditional "In dulci jubilo" and its French adaptation written by Ilbe, Sidro, and G. Stevens and produced by Phil Sterman and Lov Cook.

== Track listing ==
No.	Title	Length
1.	"La Dah-li-danse"	3:23
2.	"La Dah-li-danse" (dance mix)	3:29
3.	"La Dah-li-danse" (dolly family mix)	5:39

== Charts ==
Chart (2000)	Peak position
Belgium (Ultratop 50 Flanders)	18
