= Des fleurs pour un caméléon =

Studio album by Lio
- Released: 1991
- Genre: Pop
- Label: Polydor; ZE
- Producer: Etienne Daho

Lio chronology
Can Can (1988)	Des fleurs pour un caméléon (1991)	Peste Of! (1995)

Singles from Des fleurs pour un caméléon
- 1. "The Girl From Ipanema" Released: 1990; 2. "L'autre joue" Released: 1991

Professional ratings
Review scores
Source	Rating
Allmusic	4/5 stars

Des fleurs pour un caméléon is Belgian pop singer Lio's fifth studio album of entirely new material and sixth album overall. It was produced by French singer Etienne Daho and was released in 1991. The lead single of the album is a cover of Antônio Carlos Jobim's "The Girl From Ipanema".

== Singles ==
Release date	Single
1990	"The Girl From Ipanema"
1991	"L'autre joue"

== Re-issues ==
The album was originally released by the record company Polydor in 1991. It was re-released by Ze Records in 2005 with five bonus tracks, including the radio versions of the singles.

== Track listing ==
All tracks are written by Jacques Duvall / Jérôme Soligny.

Original Album
No.	Title	Writer(s)	Length
1.	"Je me tords"		3:46
2.	"C'est ma chance"	Etienne Daho / Nick North	3:51
3.	"L'autre joue"		5:10
4.	"Qui m'aime me suive"	Lynn Byrd - Pascal Mounet / Nicholas West	3:56
5.	"Chanson pour caméléon"	Etienne Daho / Alan Whyte	3:04
6.	"The Girl From Ipanema (featuring Etienne Daho)"	Antonio Carlos Jobim - Vinicius De Moraes / Norman Gimbel	6:08
7.	"Le seul cœur que je brise"	Jacques Duvall / Laurie Mayer	4:31
8.	"L'amour est lent"	Benjamin Minimum / Jérôme Soligny	3:02
9.	"Les voyages immobiles"	Etienne Daho / Helen Turner	3:13

Bonus Tracks (on ZE Records 2005 re-release)
No.	Title	Length
10.	"L'Autre Joue (L'Autre Mix Long Version)"	6:20
11.	"The Girl From Ipanema (Gota Remix)"	6:20
12.	"The Girl From Ipanema (Radio Mix)"	4:23
13.	"L'Autre Joue (Single Alternative Mix)"	4:38
14.	"The Girl From Ipanema (Dub Mix)"	4:10

== Personnel ==
- Backing vocals – C.C Sisters, The, Helena Noguerra, Lio, Nicholas West
- Bass – Marcel Aubé
- Drums, percussion – Chuck Sabo
- Engineer [assistant in London] – David Browne, John McDonnel*, Ron Aslan
- Engineer [assistant in Paris] – Emmanuelle Ancla, Etienne De Crécy
- Guitar – Jérôme Soligny, Xavier Geronimi
- Harmonica – Elliott Murphy
- Keyboards – David Munday, Jérôme Soligny
- Mastered by – Tony Cousins
- Mixed by – Roland Herrington
- Piano – Helen Turner
- Producer, arranged by – Etienne Daho
- Programmed by – Andy Whytmore*, Chuck Sabo, Gota*
- Reissue producer – Michel Esteban
- Remastered by – Charlus de la Salle
- Saxophone [alto & baritone], Flute – Simon Clarke
- Saxophone [tenor] – Tim Sanders
- Trumpet – Roddy Lorimer
