= Neurovision =

Studio album by Telex
- Released: 1980
- Recorded: Studio Madeleine
- Genre: Synth-pop; disco
- Label: RKM; Sire
- Producer: Telex

Telex chronology
Looking for Saint Tropez (1979)	Neurovision (1980)	Sex (1981)

Singles from Neurovision
- 1. "We Are All Getting Old" Released: 1980; 2. "Euro-Vision" Released: 1980

Neurovision is the second album by Belgian electronic pop band Telex, released in 1980. The album notably features "Euro-Vision", the band's tongue-in-cheek entry to Eurovision 1980, representing their home country of Belgium, featuring "deliberately banal lyrics" about the contest itself. Reportedly, they aspired to finish last, but ended up placing 17th out of 19.

== Track listing ==
=== Original ===
All tracks are written by Telex, except where noted

No.	Title	Writer(s)	Length
1.	"We Are All Getting Old"		3:42
2.	"My Time"	Roberto Cacciapaglia	4:21
3.	"Tour de France"		4:03
4.	"Euro-Vision"		2:43
5.	"Plus de Distance"		3:30
6.	"Dance to the Music"	Sylvester "Sly Stone" Stewart	4:15
7.	"Réalité"		3:30
8.	"Cliché"		0:44
9.	"A/B"		3:18
10.	"En route vers de nouvelles aventures"		4:23
11.	"Finale"		0:13

=== 2023 reissue ===
The 2023 Mute Records reissue features a radically different track order from the original.

No.	Title	Writer(s)	Length
1.	"A/B"		3:40
2.	"Réalité"		3:37
3.	"Cliché"		0:44
4.	"En route vers de nouvelles aventures"		4:22
5.	"Tour de France"		4:04
6.	"We Are All Getting Old"		3:41
7.	"My Time"	Roberto Cacciapaglia	4:21
8.	"Plus de distance (More Than Distance)"		3:30
9.	"Euro-Vision"		2:43
10.	"Dance to the Music"	Sylvester "Sly Stone" Stewart	3:35
11.	"Lakelele"		3:19
12.	"Soul Waves"		3:50
