= Jeanine Moulin =

Belgian poet and literary scholar

- Born: Jeanine Rozenblat; 10 April 1912; Brussels, Belgium
- Died: 18 November 1998 (aged 86)
- Known for: Poetry, literary critique
- Spouse: Leo Moulin

Jeanine Moulin (née Jeanine Rozenblat; 10 April 1912 – 18 November 1998) was a Belgian poet and literary scholar. She is known for her numerous books of poetry, as well as her research on subjects such as writer Gérard de Nerval and women's literature.

== Early life ==
The daughter of Polish immigrants, Moulin's family moved from Poland to Brussels in 1907. Moulin was born five years later. Her mother was a writer and her father a musician, and the young Moulin was raised in an artistic environment, surrounded by figures such as Franz Hellens and Joseph Roth.

== Career ==
Moulin attended the University of Brussels to study Romance philology, publishing a dissertation on Gérard de Nerval and later a guide to the poetry of Apollinaire. Her writing was recognized for its sharp analysis.

Moulin's first volume of poems, Jeux et Tourments, was published in 1947. She became a prolific writer, publishing books of literary critique or her own poems every two to three years after. She edited the collection La Poésie féminine, an anthology of women's poetry from the twelfth century through the twentieth. The anthology won her a distinction from the Académie Française. In 1977, she was elected to the Académie royale de langue et de littérature française de Belgique. The academy's president praised her as an "indefatigable researcher, as intuitive as she is meticulous."

== Style ==
Critics have described Moulin's poetry as very strong in its imagery. Claire-Anne Magnes is noted as saying that to Moulin, "words are little colorful balls the poet can juggle with," while Belgian poet Guy Goffette has compared her work to "a burning fire" in its use of light and metaphor.

== Personal life ==
Moulin married University of Belgium professor Leo Moulin, taking his last name. They had one son together, composer and musician Marc Moulin.
