= Le Banana Split =

Single by Lio

from the album Lio
- Released: 1979
- Genre: Bubblegum pop, pop punk, new wave
- Length: 2:35 (album/single version); 6:29 (maxi version)
- Label: Ariola
- Songwriters: Jacques Duvall, Jay Alanski
- Producer: Marc Moulin

Lio singles chronology
"Le Banana Split" (1979)	"Amoureux solitaires" (1980)

Music video
- «Le Banana Split» on YouTube

"Le Banana Split" is the debut single by Belgian pop singer Lio. It was a very big hit when it was first released in 1979, selling 700,000 copies. It is now considered to be Lio's signature song.

== Background ==
"Le Banana Split" was remixed in 1995 and re-released to promote Lio's greatest hits album Peste Of!.

== Live performances ==
In 1996, Lio performed a punk version of "Le Banana Split" on the French TV show "Taratata".

In 2009, Lio performed a mostly acoustic version of "Le Banana Split" on the French TV show TV5 Acoustic.

In 2012, Lio performed "Le Banana Split" during the "RFM Party 80" Tour backed by the original instrumental track. She also performed it live with Phantom, the Belgian punk band she was recording and touring with at the time.

== Release formats ==
The single was released on both regular 7" vinyl single backed with the track "Teenager", and 12" maxi vinyl in an extended disco version.

It is available on CD on various Lio compilations such as Les Pop Songs and Je garde quelques images... pour mes vies postérieures, as well as on the 2005 re-issue of her debut album by Ze Records (along with the extended disco version and the b-side "Teenager").

== Charts ==
Chart (1979)	Peak position
French Top 50	1

== Media usage ==
The track featured as a lip sync song on the first season of Drag Race France, in 2022.

The song was also used in Apple’s "Hello Yellow" commercial to promote the new yellow color for the iPhone 14 and iPhone 14 Plus in March 2023.

== Cover versions ==
- Recorded by Kim Kay on her 1998 album La Vie en lilali.
- In 2004, French radio and TV presenter Sandra Lou released her cover version as a single.

== See also ==
- Les sucettes
