= Dites au prince charmant =

Studio album by Lio
- Released: 2006
- Genre: Pop, Chanson
- Label: Recall
- Producer: Doriand, Peter Von Poehl

Lio chronology
Cœur de rubis (2003)	Dites au prince charmant (2006)	Phantom Featuring Lio (2009)

Dites au prince charmant is a 2006 album by Belgian singer Lio. It features songs written by Serge Gainsbourg, her sister Héléna Noguerra as well as longtime collaborators Jacques Duvall and Jay Alanski.

== Track listing ==
All lyrics are written by Doriand except where noted; all music is composed by Peter Von Poehl except where noted.

Original Album
No.	Title	Lyrics	Music	Length
1.	"Vieil ami"		Peter Von Poehl; Félix Niklasson
2.	"Les hommes me vont si bien"
3.	"Dites au prince charmant"
4.	"Le même sourire"	Jacques Duvall	Jay Alanski
5.	"Light"
6.	"Attends ou va-t-en"	Serge Gainsbourg	Gainsbourg
7.	"La fin du monde"	Jacques Duvall	Joseph Racaille
8.	"Dans les bras d'un enfant"
9.	"L'Âge des saisons"
10.	"Hall de gare"	Helena Noguerra
11.	"L'étendue Des dégâts"	Doriand; Marie Darrieussecq
12.	"Mon bébé"	Jacques Duvall	Joseph Racaille

== Personnel ==
- Drums, percussion – Jens Jansson
- Mastered by – Chab
- Piano, organ [electric] – Erik Hjarpe
- Backing vocals – Doriand
- Recorded by, background vocals, guitar – Peter Von Poehl
- Recorded by, mixed by, bass, flute, saxophone, arranged by [strings], instruments [additional] – Christoffer Lundquist
- Violin – Thomas Ebrelius

== Charts ==
Chart (2005)	Peak position
Belgium Wallonia Albums Chart	46
French SNEP Albums Chart	105
