= Lio (singer) =

Portuguese-Belgian singer and actress

- Lio in September 2026 at Deauville American Film Festival

Background information
- Born: Vanda Maria Ribeiro Furtado Tavares de Vasconcelos; 17 June 1962 (age 64); Mangualde, Portugal
- Origin: Brussels, Belgium
- Genres: Pop; rock; new wave; bubblegum pop; punk
- Occupations: Singer; actress
- Instrument: Vocals
- Years active: 1979–present
- Labels: ZE; Crammed Discs

Vanda Maria Ribeiro Furtado Tavares de Vasconcelos (born 17 June 1962), known professionally as Lio, is a Portuguese-Belgian singer and actress who was a pop icon in France and Belgium during the 1980s. In 2024 she began serving as a judge on Drag Race Belgium.

== Life and career ==
Vanda Maria Ribeiro Furtado Tavares de Vasconcelos was born on 17 June 1962 in Mangualde, Portugal. When her father was called up to fight in the Portuguese Army, the family moved to Mozambique. Her parents divorced and, in 1968, Vanda moved with her mother and new stepfather to Brussels, Belgium, where her sister, actress Helena Noguerra, was born. In her teens she was determined to become a singer, and she was encouraged by singer-songwriter Jacques Duvall, a family friend. She took her stage name, Lio, from a character in the Barbarella comic books by Jean-Claude Forest.

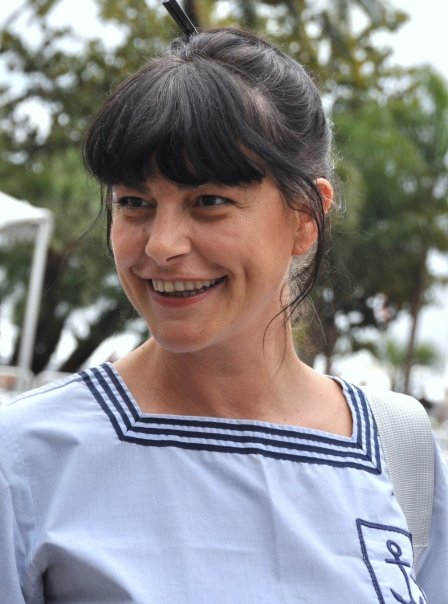
Lio in 2009

In 1979, together with songwriter Jay Alanski, she and Duvall began working with Marc Moulin and Dan Lacksman from the electro-trio Telex. Her first two singles were "Le Banana Split", which sold over 1 million copies, and "Amoureux solitaires", a song originally by punk rock band Stinky Toys. Both songs rose to the top of many pop charts in France, and Moulin and Lacksman also produced her self-titled first album. In 1982 the American music duo Ron and Russell Mael, of Sparks, worked with her on the album Suite sixtine, on which some of her previous songs were translated into English. Suite sixtine was compiled and art directed by Ralph Alfonso for Attic Records Canada, where it was originally released. Her second album, Amour toujours, was produced by Alain Chamfort and released in 1983. The same year, she first appeared on the screen in Chantal Akerman's film Golden Eighties, a lighthearted, humorous French pop musical about the people who work together in a Parisian shopping center. Lio plays a carefree hairdresser in the movie.. In 1984, she was featured in a TV special with France Gall called “Formule 1”, where she sang "Be My Baby" with Gall.

In 1985, she met record company executive and producer Michel Esteban, of ZE Records. She continued to have hit singles in Europe, including "Les brunes comptent pas pour des prunes", and travelled to Los Angeles with Esteban to record her next album Pop model. Several of the tracks were co-produced by John Cale, formerly of the Velvet Underground, and the album produced the hits "Fallait pas commencer", "Je casse tout ce que je touche", and "Chauffeur". In 1988, after she had given birth to a daughter with Esteban, she resumed her acting career, starring in Claude Lelouch's film Itinéraire d'un enfant gâté. The Lio-Esteban partnership produced another album, Can can, recorded in Los Angeles and Rio de Janeiro. She also designed a fashion collection for the European department store chain Prisunic.

She appeared in three films in 1990 and 1991, Chambre à part, Sans un cri, and Après l'amour. Her 1991 album, Des fleurs pour un caméléon, was produced by Étienne Daho, she had already contributed vocals for one of Daho's earliest and biggest hits, "Week-End À Rome". Daho was given carte blanche in the studio because Lio was busy shooting a film; however, when his work was over, he showed no interest in promoting the album with her, limiting the success of the album. Her next album, Wandatta, presenting a more mature approach in contrast with her previous image, and with a sleeve designed by Guy Peellaert, was released in 1995. However, it was relatively unsuccessful, and she withdrew for a time to live near Angoulême with her partner and children. In 1998, she recorded with Esteban in Cuba, and in 1999 she appeared in 50 performances of the French adaptation of Seven Brides For Seven Brothers, a musical staged at the Folies Bergère. She had two kids that year. She released the single "Je suis comme je suis" and the album Chante Prévert containing interpretations of the poems of Jacques Prévert, in 2000. After performing the songs on tour throughout France, Europe and North Africa, she released the live album Cœur de rubis in 2004. She also appeared in over 250 performances of the theater play Le Bébé, an adaptation of a book by Marie Darrieussecq staged by Marc Goldberg.

Since 2008, Lio has been a judge on the French "pop idol" show Nouvelle Star. In 2009, she returned to music with the rock band Phantom. In 2011, she became a judge on The Voice Belgique.

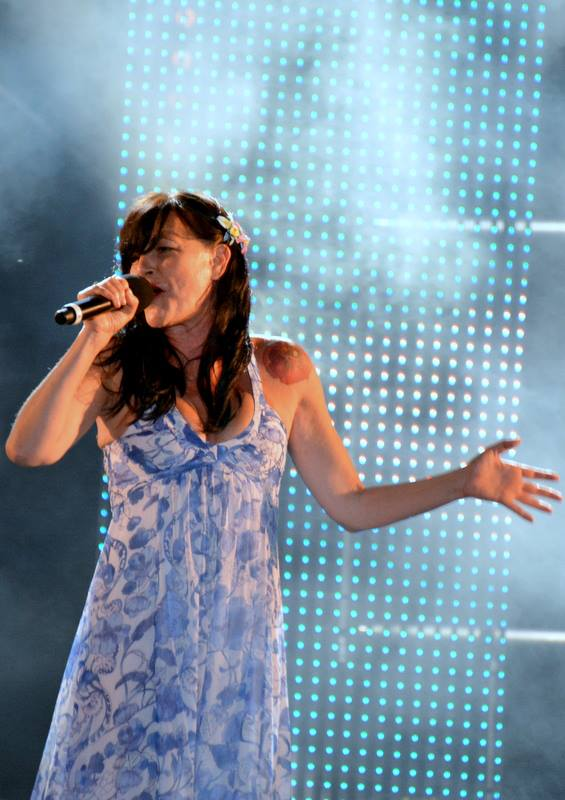
Lio on stage in 2013

As of 2012, several of Lio's songs (like her 1982 song "Mona Lisa") have been rediscovered and used as samples in numerous songs by artists in the Nu-disco, House and EDM genres. In 2014, she gave an acoustic rendition of several songs by the Brazilian composer Dorival Caymmi at the Archiduc café in central Brussels.

In March 2018, she released her new album Lio Canta Caymmi on the label Crammed Discs. It consists of half-Portuguese, half-French covers of songs by the Brazilian composer Dorival Caymmi. It was the first time she recorded an entire album in Portuguese, her mother tongue. She had previously released a cover of the Brazilian standard "The Girl from Ipanema" in 1991 but she sang the English lyrics.

In 2024 she became one of the judges on Drag Race Belgium.

== Discography ==
=== Albums ===
Year	Album	Chart	Sales
Year	Album	France	Sales
1980	Lio	9	150,000
1983	Amour toujours	-	30,000
1986	Pop model	-	100,000
1988	Can can	-	30,000
1991	Des fleurs pour un caméléon	-	15,000
1996	Wandatta	-	10,000
2000	Lio chante Prévert	-	-
2005	Dites au prince charmant	105	4,000
2009	Phantom featuring Lio (with the band Phantom)	-	1,000
2018	Lio Canta Caymmi	-	-
2025	Geoid Party in the Sky	113	2,000

- Phantom featuring Lio was released in the UK under the title Lio et les fantômes.

=== Live albums ===
- 2003: Cœur de rubis

=== Compilations ===
- 1982: Suite sixtine (a mixture of b-sides, English versions of previous songs and unreleased tracks; originally exclusive to Canada)
- 1995: Peste Of!
- 2005: Les Pop Songs (Best of 1)
- 2005: Les Ballades (Best of 2)
- 2005: Pop Box – 25 Years in Pop (7 remastered CDs with bonus tracks and 1 DVD of clips)
- 2008: Je garde quelques images... pour mes vies postérieures (double CD containing a mixture of hits and Lio's personal favorites)

=== Singles ===
Year	Single	Chart		Album
Year	Single	FRA	GER	Album
1979	"Le Banana Split"	1	-	Lio
1980	"Amoureux solitaires"	1	11	Lio
1980	"Amicalement votre"	19	59	Lio
1980	"Sage comme une image"	-	-	Suite sixtine
1982	"Mona Lisa"	-	-	Suite sixtine
1983	"Zip a doo wah"	-	-	Amour toujours
1983	"La Reine des pommes"	-	-	Amour toujours
1985	"Tétéou" (Lio featuring Jacky)	48	-	-
1986	"Les Brunes comptent pas pour des prunes"	10	-	Pop model
1986	"Les Filles veulent tout" (Canada only)	-	-	Pop model
1987	"Fallait pas commencer"	5	-	Pop model
1987	"Je casse tout ce que je touche"	22	-	Pop model
1987	"Chauffeur suivez cette voiture"	-	-	Pop model
1987	"La Bamba" (Los Portos featuring Lio)	-	-	-
1988	"Seules les filles pleurent"	-	-	Can can
1989	"Tu es formidable"	-	-	Can can
1990	"The Girl from Ipanema" (Lio featuring Etienne Daho)	-	-	Des fleurs pour un Caméléon
1991	"L'Autre joue"	-	-	Des fleurs pour un Caméléon
1995	"Le Banana Split 95"	-	-	Peste Of!
1996	"Tristeza"	-	-	Wandatta
1996	"A la fête des animaux" (promo only)	-	-	-
1998	"Ganja" (Lio featuring Los Van Van) (remix)	-	-	-
2000	"Je suis comme je suis"	-	-	Chante Prévert
2005	"Les Hommes me vont si bien" (promo only)	-	-	Dites au prince charmant
2007	"Les Matins de Paris" (Teki Latex featuring Lio)	14	-	Party de plaisir (Teki Latex album)
2009	"Je ne veux que ton bien" (Phantom featuring Lio)	-	-	Phantom featuring Lio
2009	"La Veille de ma naissance" (Phantom featuring Lio)	-	-	Phantom featuring Lio
2014	"Poupée pop"	-	-	-
2018	"É Doce Morrer No Mar" (featuring Jacques Duvall)	-	-	Lio Canta Caymmi
2020	"Basta"	-	-	Geoid Party In The Sky
2025	"L'amour de ma vie"	-	-	Geoid Party In The Sky

== Theatre ==
- 2004 : Le Bébé by Marie Darrieussecq, directed by Marc Goldberg

== Filmography ==
Year	Title	Role	Director	Notes
1985	Elsa, Elsa	Elsa	Didier Haudepin	
1986	Golden Eighties	Mado	Chantal Akerman	
1988	Itinerary of a Spoiled Child	Yvette	Claude Lelouch	
1989	Chambre à part	Marie	Jacky Cukier	
1991	Jalousie	Camille	Kathleen Fonmarty	
1991	Sans un cri	Anne	Jeanne Labrune	
1991	Rock-a-Doodle	Goldie	Don Bluth	French voice
1991	Sale comme un ange	Barbara	Catherine Breillat	
1992	Love After Love	Marianne	Diane Kurys	
1993	The Dead Mother	Maite	Juanma Bajo Ulloa	
1994	Personne ne m'aime	Marie	Marion Vernoux	
1994	Ne m'appelez pas ma petite	Jennifer	Jean Becker	TV movie
1995	La niña de tus sueños	Françoise	Jesús R. Delgado	
1995	Dieu, l'amant de ma mère et le fils du charcutier	Gabrielle	Aline Issermann	
1997	Peccato		Manuel Gómez	
1997	Palmyra		Tatiana De Perlinghi	Short
1997	Opération Bugs Bunny	Bugs Bunny's fiancée	Michel Hassan	TV movie
1998	Micro climat	Brigitte	Marc Simenon	TV movie
2002	Carnage	Betty	Delphine Gleize	
2003	Un grain de beauté	The fourth comedian	Odile Abergel	Short
2003	Je tourne avec Almodovar	The Fairy of Cards	Jean-Philippe Amar	Short
2004	Mariages !	Micky	Valérie Guignabodet	
2004	Colette, une femme libre	Marguerite Moreno	Nadine Trintignant	TV Mini-Series
2005	Les Invisibles	Carole Stevens	Thierry Jousse	
2005	Les Vacances de Noël	Lilo	Jan Bucquoy	
2005	C'est la vie, camarade !	Charlène	Bernard Uzan	TV movie
2006	Intime conviction	The Accused	Bernard Gonner	TV series (1 Episode)
2006	Le juge est une femme	Louise Delcourt	Eric Summer	TV series (1 Episode)
2007	Pas douce	Eugenia	Jeanne Waltz	
2007	The Last Mistress	The singer	Catherine Breillat	
2007	Notable donc coupable	Cynthia	Dominique Baron & Francis Girod	TV movie
2007	Lost Signs	Michèle Costa	Didier Albert	TV Mini-Series
2008	Le prince de ce monde	Florence	Manuel Gómez	
2008	Rien dans les poches	Nicole Manikowski	Marion Vernoux	TV movie
2009	La robe du soir	Hélène Solenska	Myriam Aziza	
2010	Love Like Poison	Jeanne Falguères	Katell Quillévéré	
2011	Le temps du silence	The singer	Franck Apprederis	TV movie
2011	À dix minutes de nulle part	Marie	Arnauld Mercadier	TV movie
2011	Rani	Madam Rose	Arnaud Sélignac	TV series (3 Episodes)
2012	Stars 80	Herself	Frédéric Forestier & Thomas Langmann	
2013	Henri	Rita	Yolande Moreau	
2013	Tiger Lily, quatre femmes dans la vie	Muriel	Benoît Cohen	TV Mini-Series
2013	Nos chers voisins	Céline	Emmanuel Rigaut	TV series (1 Episode)
2015	Belgian Disaster	Marie-Claire	Patrick Glotz	
2015	Le sang de la vigne	Angèle Marcarol	Régis Musset	TV series (1 Episode)
2017	Stars 80, la suite	Herself	Frédéric Forestier & Thomas Langmann	
2017	Les Onironautes	The mother	Mathias Zivanovic	Short
2020	Le Voyageur	Anne Farou	Stéphanie Murat	TV series (1 Episode)
2021	Les démons de Dorothy	Motherator	Alexis Langlois	Short
2022	Elle m'a sauvée	Nathalie Tomasini	Ionut Teianu	TV movie
2023	Scènes de ménages	Livia	Francis Duquet	TV series (1 Episode)

== Bibliography ==
- Lio; Verlant, Gilles (2005). Pop model. J'ai lu. ISBN 2-290-34721-3.
