= Electronic System =

Belgian band

Electronic System is a Belgian synthesizer group by Dan Lacksman, formed in 1972.

The group released two albums: "Tchip Tchip" (1974) and "Disco Machine" (1977). The main instrument on both albums is a Moog synthesizer.

Disco Machine is an album of seven original compositions from Dan Lacksman, who is better known as being part of the group Telex. The song "Fly to Venus" has been sampled by the Chemical Brothers for their song "Star Guitar".

== Discography ==
- Coconut (7" - Omega International, 1972)
  - Coconut (2:30)
  - You're Gonna Be My Friend
- Top Tang' (7" - Omega International, 1973)
  - Top Tang'
  - Electronic Fair
- Tchip.Tchip (Vol. 3) (LP, Album - Omega International, 1974)
  - Tchip Tchip (2:06)
  - Hey Hey (2:20)
  - Stay With Me (4:32)
  - In The Woods (1:55)
  - Spider (2:45)
  - Funny Kouly (2:15)
  - Lullaby (3:05)
  - Skylab (14:15)
- Disco Machine (LP - Targa Records, 1977)
  - Flight To Tokyo (6:11)
  - Cosmos Trip (5:12)
  - Flight To Venus (5:37)
  - Sailing To An Unknown Planet (5:35)
  - Time Trip (4:51)
  - Rock Machine (4:02)
  - Back Home (2:45)
- Disco Machine (LP - Musique Belgique Archive, 1977)
  - Flight To Tokyo
  - Cosmos Trip
  - Fly To Venus
  - Sailing To An Unknown Planet
  - Time Trip
  - Rock Machine
  - Back Home
- Disco Machine (CD - Musique Belgique Archive)
  - Re-release from the original recording in 1977

== Chart Success ==
| Single title | Release date | Charting in the Dutch Top 40 | | | Comments |
| Single title | Release date | Date of entry | Highest | Weeks | Comments |
|---|---|---|---|---|---|
| Coconut | | 24-2-1973 | 20 | 4 | |
