= 100 Club Punk Special =

1976 music event in London, England

Coordinates: 51°30′58″N 0°8′7.3″W

- Genre: Punk rock
- Dates: 20–21 September 1976
- Locations: 100 Club, Oxford Street, London
- Attendance: About 600
- Organiser: Ron Watts; Malcolm McLaren
- Website: Official

The 100 Club Punk Special (sometimes referred to as the 100 Club Punk Festival) was a two-day event held at the 100 Club venue in Oxford Street, London, England, on 20 and 21 September 1976. The gig showcased eight punk rock bands, most of which were unsigned. Most of the bands in attendance were each associated with the then evolving punk rock music scene of the United Kingdom. Historically, the event has become seen as marking a watershed moment for punk rock, as it began to move from the underground and emerge into the mainstream music scene.

== Promotion ==
In early September 1976, concert promoter Ron Watts approached Malcolm McLaren, manager of the Sex Pistols, the leaders of the new British punk rock scene, and proposed that they headline the event. After that, they presented the idea to the Damned and the Clash, both of which quickly agreed to participate. Siouxsie Sioux directly approached Watts and requested to join the line-up as well. McLaren then volunteered the French band Stinky Toys and a handful of other bands from Manchester.

The enthusiasm for this event was partly due to the very positive and extensive promotion by Melody Maker journalist Caroline Coon.

== The line-up ==
Monday evening, 20 September 1976

- Subway Sect
- Siouxsie and the Banshees
- The Clash
- Sex Pistols

Tuesday evening, 21 September 1976

- Stinky Toys
- Chris Spedding & the Vibrators
- The Damned
- Buzzcocks

== Performances ==
The Vibrators were a new group that had only recently begun to write their own music and, at the encouragement of Ron Watts, they decided to act as backing band for established artist Chris Spedding for the show. Spedding, who had been booked to play the second night but didn't have a band behind him, taught The Vibrators a few songs in the dressing room immediately prior the actual show, leaving no time for an actual rehearsal. Siouxsie and the Banshees' set, however, was completely improvisational. They didn't know or play any songs, and their act had a purely "performance art" quality. Siouxsie, for instance, recited the Lord's Prayer and similar memorised pieces of text.

None of the shows were rehearsed, says Ron Watts, "It was just people, getting up and trying to do something."

== Attendees ==
Attendance at the event later become a badge of honour for punk rock fans, but it is probable that a lot of claims were apocryphal. Indeed, a great many people who were later to become involved in the punk scene claimed to have "been there" during the two-day festival, but this is unlikely to be true since the venue had only a 600-person capacity. However, amongst the verified attendees were: Paul Weller of the Jam, Shane MacGowan (later of the Nipple Erectors and the Pogues), Shanne Bradley (of the Nipple Erectors and the Men They Couldn't Hang), Colin Newman of Wire, Viv Albertine of the Slits, Chrissie Hynde (later of the Pretenders), Jah Wobble (later of PiL), Vivienne Westwood (McLaren's then partner and co-manager of the Chelsea boutique Sex), Kevin Haskins and his brother David J (later of Bauhaus), Gaye Advert and T. V. Smith (later of The Adverts), as well as members of the Bromley Contingent, the punk fashion avant-garde, Andrew Czezowski (ex-manager of the Damned) and Susan Carrington, who went on to start the Roxy with Barry Jones..

== Incident with Sid Vicious ==
The event was marred by violence when a beer glass, thrown by then Banshees drummer and later Sex Pistols bass player Sid Vicious during the Damned's performance shattered against a pillar, blinding a young girl in one eye. Vicious was arrested shortly after the incident and spent several days in jail.

== See also ==
- List of punk rock festivals
- List of historic rock festivals
