= Rani (French TV series) =

- Genre: Adventures; Romance
- Based on: Rani by Jean Van Hamme
- Written by: Huguette Marien; Jean Van Hamme
- Directed by: Arnaud Sélignac
- Starring: Mylène Jampanoï; Jean-Hugues Anglade
- Music by: Fabrice Aboulker
- Country of origin: France
- No. of seasons: 1
- No. of episodes: 8

Production
- Producer: Alain Clert
- Cinematography: José António Loureiro
- Running time: 52 minutes

Original release
- Release: 14 December 2011 – 2012

Rani is a French television adventure mini-series from France in 2011, directed by Arnaud Sélignac. Eight episodes aired in total, broadcast from December 14, 2011, on the channel France 2. Before being broadcast in France, the series has been in Belgium, on La Une, from August 27, 2011.

== Cast ==
- Mylène Jampanoï : Jolanne de Valcourt
- Jean-Hugues Anglade : Philippe de Valcourt
- Pascal Demolon : Laroche
- Rémi Bichet : Craig Walker
- Yael Abecassis : Jeanne Dupleix
- Olivier Sitruk : Ranveer Singh
- Emma Reynaud : Laure de Marsac
- Antoine Gouy : Charles de Bussy
- Neena Kulkarni : Queen Mother
- Tom Morton (Actor) : Robert Clive (voice)
- Lio : Madam Rose
- Gabriella Wright : Indra
- Jean-Philippe Écoffey : Joseph-François Dupleix
