= Bam Bam (nickname) =

As a nickname, Bam Bam may refer to:

== People with the nickname ==
- James Bamford (born 1967), Canadian stunt coordinator and stuntman
- Action Bronson (born 1983), American rapper
- Bradley Brooks (Born, 2000), English Professional Darts player
- Kam Chancellor (born 1988), American National Football League player
- Reshawn Davis (born 1978), American bodyguard and co-star of the reality TV series Rob & Big
- Terry Gordy (1961–2001), American professional wrestler
- John Michael Johnson (born 1968), bantamweight boxer, briefly world champion
- Brittany Lincicome (born 1985), American professional golfer
- Hensley Meulens (born 1967), former Major League Baseball player
- Daniel Rich (born 1990), Australian rules footballer
- Ken Weekes (1912–1998), West Indian cricketer
- Patrick Willis (born 1985), American National Football League player
- Iván Zamorano (born 1967), Chilean footballer

== People with the ring name ==
- Bam Bam Bigelow (1961–2007), American professional wrestler
- Bam Bam (wrestler) (born 1985), Mexican professional wrestler
- Tai Tuivasa (born 1993), Australian rugby league player turned mixed martial artist of Samoan descent

== People with the stage name ==
- Bam Bam (radio presenter) (born 1970), a UK personality on Jack FM
- BamBam (singer) (born 1997), Thai singer/rapper based in South Korea, member of Got7

== See also ==
- Bam Bam (disambiguation)
