= Poupée de cire, poupée de son =

1965 song by France Gall

- Cover of the EP Poupée de cire, poupée de son

Song by France Gall

from the EP Poupée de cire, poupée de son
- Language: French
- A-side: "Poupée de cire, poupée de son" "Un prince charmant"
- B-side: "Dis à ton capitaine" "Le cœur qui jazze"
- Released: March 1965
- Studio: Studio Blanqui
- Genre: Yé-yé; French pop
- Length: 2:34
- Label: Philips
- Songwriter: Serge Gainsbourg
- Producer: Denis Bourgeois

France Gall singles chronology
"Sacré Charlemagne" (1964)	"Poupée de cire, poupée de son" (1965)	"Attends ou va-t-en" (1965)

Eurovision Song Contest 1965 entry
- Country: Luxembourg
- Artist: Isabelle Gall
- As: France Gall
- Language: French
- Composer: Serge Gainsbourg
- Lyricist: Serge Gainsbourg
- Conductor: Alain Goraguer

Finals performance
- Final result: 1st
- Final points: 32

Entry chronology
- ◄ "Dès que le printemps revient" (1964)
- "Ce soir je t'attendais" (1966) ►

Official performance video
- "Poupée de cire, poupée de son" on YouTube

"Poupée de cire, poupée de son" (French pronunciation: [pupe də siʁ pupe də sɔ̃]; English: "Wax doll, rag doll") is a song recorded by French singer France Gall with music composed and French lyrics written by Serge Gainsbourg. It represented Luxembourg in the Eurovision Song Contest 1965 held in Naples, winning the contest.

The song was inspired by the 4th movement (Prestissimo in F minor) from Beethoven's Piano Sonata No. 1. It was one of fourteen songs that participated in the Eurovision fiftieth anniversary competition Congratulations: 50 Years of the Eurovision Song Contest held on 22 October 2005, as one of the best Eurovision songs.

The day after her Eurovision victory the single had sold 16,000 copies in France, four months later it had sold more than 500,000 copies.

== Background ==
=== Conception ===
"Poupée de cire, poupée de son" music and French Lyrics were written by Serge Gainsbourg for France Gall. Its melody was inspired by the 4th movement (Prestissimo in F minor) from Beethoven's Piano Sonata No. 1. As is common with Gainsbourg's lyrics, the words are filled with double meanings, wordplay, and puns. The title can be translated as "wax doll, rag doll" (a floppy doll stuffed with bran or chaff) or as "wax doll, sound doll" (with implications that Gall is a "singing doll" controlled by Gainsbourg). This sense of being a "singing doll" for Gainsbourg reached a peak when he later wrote "Les Sucettes" ("Lollipops") for Gall.

Sylvie Simmons wrote that the song is about "the ironies and incongruities inherent in baby pop"—that "the songs young people turn to for help in their first attempts at discovering what life and love are about are sung by people too young and inexperienced themselves to be of much assistance, and condemned by their celebrity to be unlikely to soon find out."

Gall recorded the song in French, German – as "Das war eine schöne Party" with lyrics by Carl-Ulrich Blecher, Italian – as "Io sì, tu no" with lyrics by Vito Pallavicini, and Japanese – as "Yumemiru chanson ningyo" with lyrics by Tokiko Iwatani.

=== Eurovision ===
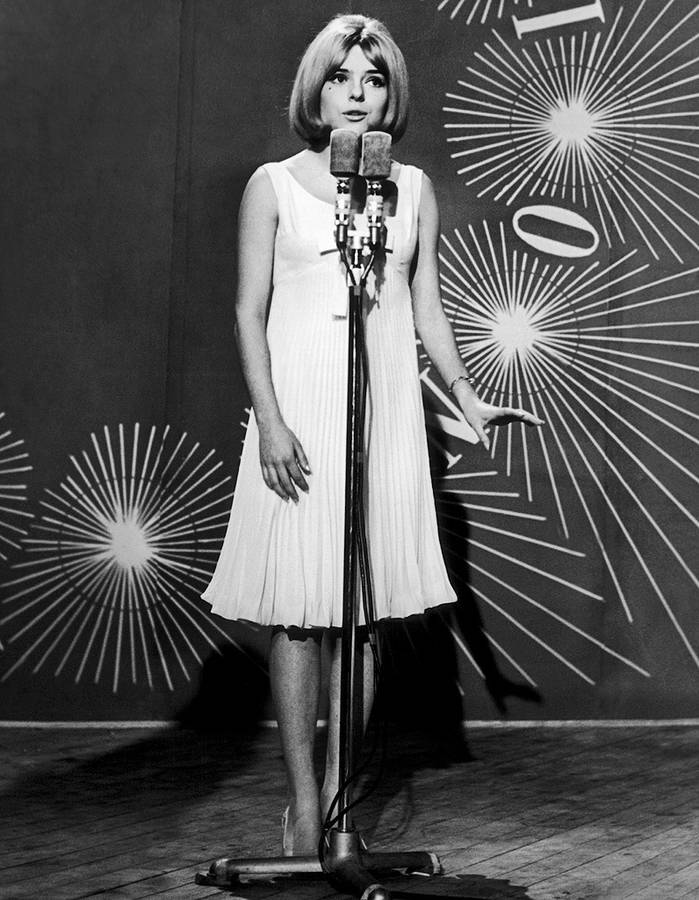
Gall at Eurovision

The Compagnie Luxembourgeoise de Télédiffusion (CLT) internally selected the song as its entrant for the 10th edition of the Eurovision Song Contest.

On 20 March 1965, the Eurovision Song Contest was held at the Sala di Concerto della RAI in Naples hosted by Radiotelevisione italiana (RAI), and broadcast live throughout the continent. Gall performed "Poupée de cire, poupée de son" sixteenth on the evening, following Denmark's "For din skyld" by Birgit Brüel and preceding Finland's "Aurinko laskee länteen" by Viktor Klimenko. Alain Goraguer conducted the event's live orchestra in the performances of the Luxembourguian entry.

At the close of voting, it had received 32 points, placing first in a field of eighteen, and winning the contest. This was the second win for Luxembourg in the contest.

=== Aftermath ===
The French public retrospectively reproached Gall and Gainsbourg for having represented [and won for] Luxembourg and not for their own country. Two years later Sandie Shaw entered the contest and won with another puppet themed song, "Puppet on a String". A Yugoslav newspaper, Politika Ekspres, in 1965 claimed that the first 18 bars of the song were identical to "Ljubav Treba Čekati", a song composed by Zarko Roje, presented at the Opatija 64 festival.

"Poupée de cire, poupée de son" was one of fourteen songs chosen by Eurovision fans and a European Broadcasting Union (EBU) reference group, from among the 992 songs that had ever participated in the contest, to participate in the fiftieth anniversary competition Congratulations: 50 Years of the Eurovision Song Contest held on 22 October 2005 in Copenhagen.

On the 60th anniversary of its win, "Poupée de cire, poupée de son" directly inspired Luxembourg's entry to the 2025 Eurovision Song Contest, "La poupée monte le son". Written by Julien Salvia and Ludovic-Alexandre Vidal, and performed by Laura Thorn, this version strikes a defiant tone of self-empowerment responding to the lack of agency conveyed in the original.

== Lyrics ==
=== Summary ===
The central image of the song is that the singer identifies herself as a wax doll (poupée de cire), a sound doll (poupée de son). Her heart is engraved in her songs; she sees life through the bright, rose–tinted glasses of her songs. Is she better or worse than a fashion doll (poupée de salon)?

Her recordings are like a mirror where anyone can see her. Through her recordings, it is as though she has been smashed into a thousand shards of voice and scattered so that she is everywhere at once. This central image is extended, as she refers to her listeners as rag dolls (poupées de chiffon) who laugh, dance to the music, and allow themselves to be seduced for any reason or no reason at all. But love is not just in songs, and the singer asks herself what good it is to sing about love when she herself knows nothing about boys.

The two concluding verses seem to refer to Gall herself. In them, she sings that she is nothing but a wax doll, his doll, under the sun of her blond hair. But someday she, the wax doll, will be able to actually live her songs without fearing the warmth of boys.

=== Self–referentiality, puns, wordplay, and double meanings ===
Self–referentiality, puns, word play, and double meanings are integral to Gainsbourg's style of lyric writing. These factors make it difficult for non–French speakers to understand the nuances of the lyrics, and even more difficult to translate the lyrics.

==== Self–referentiality ====
At a young age, France Gall was too naïve to understand the second meaning of the lyrics. She felt she was used by Gainsbourg throughout this period, most notably after the song "Les sucettes", which was literally about lollipops, but with multiple double entendres referring to oral sex.

Poupée de son can also mean "doll of sound" or "song doll" – France Gall could be said to be the doll through which Gainsbourg channels his sounds.

The song's reference to the doll under a "sun of blond hair", exactly like Gall's own, is one of the song's self–references.

As Sylvie Simmons wrote in Serge Gainsbourg: A Fistful of Gitanes:

"Poupée ... " was catchy, and on the surface pretty annoying – perfect Eurovision fodder, in other words – but closer examination revealed perspicacious lyrics about the ironies and incongruities inherent in baby–pop."

In typical Gainsbourg fashion, the song is first of all self–referential in that it is written for a baby–pop performer to sing about herself—complete with reference to Gall singing beneath her "sun of blond hair" and double meanings clearly tying the song to Gall's own life situation: Singing songs created by adults and carrying themes purposefully introduced by those controlling adults which the young performer only partially understands. Gall herself is the "Poupée de cire, poupée de son" of the song's title.

But the self–referentiality goes far beyond this. The writing of "Poupée" by Gainsbourg and its performance by Gall is itself an example of this very dynamic at work, and Gainsbourg knew that Gall, at her age, would understand the ramifications of this dynamic only partially, even at the same moment she was performing a song about it. In writing "Poupée", Gainsbourg is purposefully exploiting the very dynamic that is the subject of the song.

It was this extra dimension, in part, that helped the song to the top of the Eurovision contest.

However, Gainsbourg felt that this portion of his songwriting output was particularly groundbreaking and daring, yet simultaneously made Gall feel profoundly uncomfortable with this material—that she was being deliberately manipulated and exploited by the adults around her—particularly in retrospect as she matured.

In later years, Gall dissociated herself from the Eurovision Song Contest, and refused to discuss it in public or perform her winning song.

==== Poupée de cire, poupée de son ====
In a literal sense, poupée de cire means "wax doll".

Son in the context of poupée de son means 'bran' or 'straw', of the kind used to stuff children's floppy dolls . Poupée de son is a long–standing expression in French meaning "doll stuffed with straw or bran". It is also used in the expression syndrome du bébé "poupée de son", "floppy baby syndrome" (infantile hypotonia), and can even refer to someone too drunk to stand up.

So in the first place, poupée de son refers to a floppy type of doll like a rag doll, with no backbone of its own but which, like a puppet, is under the control of others.

The double meanings of the two terms cire and son come in because of the subject matter of the lyrics, which contain many references to singing and recording. Cire ('wax') brings to mind the old shellac records, commonly known in France as "wax disks". Son has a second meaning–"sound".

These double meanings are amplified in Gainsbourg's lyrics. For instance, the first verse refers to the fact that the singer's heart is engraved in her songs, much in the way the sound vibrations are engraved in a wax recording. A later reference is made to the singer being broken into a thousand pieces of voice, as though she herself is made of sound.

English versions of the lyrics often translate the title as "Wax Doll, Singing Doll", "The lonely singing doll" (the version sung by Twinkle), or something similar—translations that are not literally correct but which capture some of the double meaning implicit in the original version.

As Sylvie Simmons summarized the theme of this song: "The songs young people turn to for help in their first attempts at discovering what life and love are about, are sung by people too young and inexperienced to be of much help and condemned by their celebrity to be unlikely to soon find out."

==== Voir la vie en rose bonbon ====
"Voir la vie en rose" means "to see life through rose–tinted glasses", while "rose bonbon" refers to the lurid pink colouring used in children's sweets.

So the entire phrase as found in the lyrics – "Je vois la vie en rose bonbon"—can be translated as something like, "I see life through pink candy–coloured glasses".

==== Briser en mille éclats de voix ====
Like "Voir la vie en rose bonbon", "Briser en mille éclats de voix" is a combination of two separate phrases, put together to mean something more than either alone.

"Briser en mille éclats" means "to smash to pieces". "Éclats de voix" means "shouts" or "screams".

Thus "Brisée en mille éclats de voix" could be translated as "Broken in thousand pieces of voice" or "Smashed in a thousand shouts".

==== Pour un oui, pour un nom ====
"Celles qui dansent sur mes chansons ... Elles se laissent séduire pour un oui, pour un nom" translates literally as "Those who dance to my songs ... They give in to a yes, to a name".

However, the phrase "Se laissent séduire pour un oui, pour un nom" sounds like the phrase "Se laisser séduire pour un oui, pour un non" which means literally "to let themselves be seduced for a yes, for a no".

This can more colloquially translated as "to give in to the slightest temptation" or "to let themselves be seduced for any reason at all".

As Alex Chabot writes:

The French here, Pour un oui pour un nom, sounds very much like Pour un oui pour un non, which litterally [sic] is for a yes for no, or "for any reason at all." In this case, the suggestion is that a name, in the context of a casual introduction, for instance, is sufficient. This is really a very subtle, and clever, play on words.

== Commercial performance ==
=== Weekly charts ===
Chart (1965)	Peak position
Argentinian Singles Chart	2
Belgium (Flanders) Singles Chart	4
Belgium (Wallonia) Singles Chart	6
Finnish Singles Chart	5
French–Canada Singles Chart	1
French Singles Chart	1
Japanese Oricon Singles Chart	6
Luxembourg Singles Chart	2
Dutch Singles Chart	5
Norway Singles Chart	1
Quebec (ADISQ)	8
Singapore Singles Chart	7
Swiss Singles Chart	4
West Germany Singles Chart	3

== Legacy ==
=== In other languages ===
Versions of "Poupée de cire, poupée de son" in other languages include:

- Arabic: دمية من الشمع، ودمية من نخالة, romanized: Dumya min aš-šamʿ, wa-dumya min nuḫāla ("Doll of wax, and doll of bran")
- Chinese: 大飯寶; pinyin: Dà fàn bǎo; Jyutping: Daai2 faan6 bou2 ("The big rice cooker"), sung by The Chung Brothers, for the animated movie McDull: Rise of the Rice Cooker
- Czech: Vosková panenka ("Wax doll"), sung by Eva Pilarová and then by Hana Zagorová
- Danish: Lille dukke ("Little doll"), sung by Gitte Hænning
- Dutch: De modepop ("The fashion doll") sung by Marijke Merckens (1965) and Was ("Wax"), sung by Spinvis (2007)
- English: A Lonely Singing Doll, sung by Twinkle
- Estonian: Vahanukk ("Wax doll"), sung by Tiiu Varik; Laulev vahanukk ("Singing wax doll"), sung by Evelin Võigemast
- Finnish: Vahanukke, laulava nukke ("Wax doll, singing doll"), sung by Ritva Palukka
- German: Das war eine schöne Party ("That was a nice party"), sung by France Gall; Das Puppenhaus ("The doll's house"), sung by the Swiss singer Cornelia Grolimund (1995)
- Hungarian: Viaszbaba ("Wax Doll") by performed by Mária Toldy
- Hebrew: אל תכעסי זה לא אסון, romanized: Al tichasi ze lo ason ("Don't be angry, it's not a disaster") by Haim Hefer, performed by Yarkon Bridge Trio; בובת קש Bubat kash ("Rag doll"), performed by Gila Edri.
- Italian: Io sì, tu no ("I do, you don't"), sung by France Gall
- Japanese: 夢みるシャンソン人形, romanized: Yumemiru shanson ningyō ("Dreaming chanson doll"), sung by France Gall; there are also other versions sung by Mieko Hirota, Minami Saori, Fumie Hosokawa and Juju (singer) (October 2015)
- Korean: 노래하는 밀랍 인형; RR: Noraehaneun millap inhyeong ("The singing wax doll")
- Portuguese: Boneca de cera, boneca de som ("Wax doll, doll of sound"), sung by Wanderléa (Brazil) and Madalena Iglésias (Portugal)
- Russian: Кукла восковая, romanized: Kukla voskovaya ("Wax doll"), sung by Muslim Magomayev
- Slovak: Vosková bábika ("Wax doll"), sung by Oľga Szabová
- Spanish: Muñeca de cera ("Wax doll"), sung by Karina, Leo Dan and Juán "Corazón" Ramón
- Swedish: Det kan väl inte jag rå för ("I really can't help it, can I?"), sung by Gitte Hænning, Anne–Lie Rydé and Lill–Babs
- Vietnamese: Búp bê không tình yêu ("Doll without love"), sung by Ngọc Lan; a dance version by Mỹ Tâm; Performed on Thúy Nga's Paris by Night 52 by Trúc Lam & Trúc Linh in 1999 at Terrace Theater in Long Beach, California

=== Cover versions ===
- The Swedish metal band Therion did two versions of the song on their album Les Fleurs Du Mal in 2012. They also made a video clip to one of the versions.
- The Spanish group Parchís used part of the main melody in their song "Corazón de plomo" ("Heart made of lead"), talking about a toy soldier, quite similar to the song of France Gall.
- The Spanish singer Javier Corcobado covered the song on his album Fotografiando al corazón, released in 2003.
- Montreal indie rock band Arcade Fire have sung a cover of "Poupée de Cire, poupée de son" throughout their 2007 tour in promotion of their album Neon Bible. They later released a studio version of it on their split 7-inch single with LCD Soundsystem.
- The German band Welle: Erdball covered the song on their album Chaos Total from 2006.
- The Japanese Shibuya-kei band Bridge covered the song and released it as a single in 1993. It was used on commercials for the Mitsubishi Minica.
- The Swiss band Hillbilly Moon Explosion covered the song on their album By Popular Demand, released in 2005.
- New York City band Les Sans Culottes covered the song on their 2004 album, Fixation Orale.
- The Scottish band Belle and Sebastian performed a live version for the Black Sessions, recorded to video for the Fans Only DVD, released on Jeepster Records.
- The German punk band Wizo had a cover of this song on their album Herrenhandtasche released in 1995.
- The Spanish band Nosoträsh performs a cover in their album Nadie hablará de...
- The Spanish band Nena Daconte performed a cover in the TV programme Eurovisión 2009, el retorno which was broadcast at TVE1 on Saturday 21 February 2009.
- The Spanish singer La Terremoto de Alcorcón performed a cover (titled "Muñeca de Alcorcón" (meaning "Doll of Alcorcón") in the television programme Los mejores años de nuestra vida. Especial Todos con Soraya a Eurovisión, which was broadcast at TVE1 on 12 May 2009.
- Norwegian band Sterk Naken og Biltyvene (SNoB) did a cover of the Norwegian version "Lille Dukke" on their 1994 album Tretten Røde Roser.
- Belgian singer Kim Kay recorded a dance version in 1998.

=== Homages in Anime ===
- Anime series Sugar Sugar Rune uses an altered version of the music in its opening theme.
- The opening theme for the anime series Ai Tenshi Densetsu Wedding Peach, titled "Yumemiru ai tenshi", is both a direct reference to the Japanese version of the song (both start with yumemiru) and samples exactly the same chord progression and parts of the melody.
- In the anime Macross Frontier, the song Ninjīn Loves you yeah! by Yoko Kanno is structurally and stylistically very similar.

=== Kim Kay version ===
"Poupée de cire, poupée de son"

Single by Kim Kay

from the album La Vie en lilali
- Released: 13 November 1998
- Recorded: 1998 at Sterman & Cook Studio
- Genre: Eurodance
- Length: 2:18
- Label: EMI
- Songwriter: Serge Gainsbourg
- Producers: Phil Sterman; Lov Cook

Kim Kay singles chronology
"Oui oh oui" (1998)	"Poupée de cire, poupée de son" (1998)	"Bam bam" (1999)

Music video
- "Poupée de cire, poupée de son" on YouTube

Another version of the song was by the Belgian Eurodance singer Kim Kay. It was released on 13 November 1998 on EMI as the third single and as well as the twelfth track from her debut studio album, La Vie en lilali (1998). It is a Eurodance song that was written by Serge Gainsbourg and produced by Phil Sterman and Lov Cook.

==== Track listing ====
Belgium CD single
No.	Title	Writer(s)	Length
1.	"Poupée de cire, poupée de son" (radio edit)	Serge Gainsbourg	2:18
2.	"Poupée de cire, poupée de son" (instrumental)	Serge Gainsbourg	2:18

Netherlands CD single
No.	Title	Writer(s)	Length
1.	"Poupée de cire, poupée de son" (radio edit)	Serge Gainsbourg	2:18
2.	"Lilali" (extended mix)	Guido Veulemans; Wim Claes; Katrien Gillis	5:49

France CD single
No.	Title	Writer(s)	Length
1.	"Poupée de cire, poupée de son"	Serge Gainsbourg	3:30
2.	"À nous"	Sidro; Ilbe; Véronique Loiselet	3:53
3.	"Lilali"	Guido Veulemans; Wim Claes; Katrien Gillis	4:14

==== Charts ====
Chart (1998–99)	Peak position
Belgium (Ultratop 50 Flanders)	23
France (SNEP)	30

==== Certifications ====
Region	Certification	Certified units/sales
France (SNEP)	Gold	250,000^{*}
^{*} Sales figures based on certification alone.

=== Jenifer version ===
Jenifer did a cover in her 2013 album Ma déclaration. It was the first single from the album charting in SNEP in April and May 2013.

==== Charts ====
Chart (2013)	Peak position
France (SNEP)	21

Preceded by "Non ho l'età" by Gigliola Cinquetti	Eurovision Song Contest winners 1965	Succeeded by "Merci, Chérie" by Udo Jürgens
