= Geoid Party in the Sky =

Geoid Party In The Sky

Studio album by Lio
- Released: 2025
- Recorded: 2020–2025
- Genres: Chanson française, pop, electropop
- Language: French
- Labels: Play Two, Wanda en Fourrure
- Producer: Dimitri Tikovoï

Lio chronology
Lio Canta Caymmi (2018)	Geoid Party In The Sky (2025)

Geoid Party in the Sky is the 12th studio album by Belgian-Portuguese singer Lio, released by Play Two on 21 November 2025.

== History ==
The album is primarily produced by Dimitri Tikovoï who was once Lio's stepson. As for the lyrics, they were written exclusively by women, such as Louane, Hoshi, Jenn Ayache, Sophie Ellis-Bextor and Corine. Lio started working on her album before the start of the COVID-19 pandemic.

On 19 February 2020, Lio debuted the song "Basta" live on Belgian television and announced she was working on songs composed by Hoshi, Jenn Ayache, Alma Forrer. In May 2024, Lio launched an online campaign to fund the album.

"L'amour de ma vie" is the first official single from the album and was released on 12 September 2025. The video, released on 31 October 2025, was directed by Sébastien Hivert-Mallet.

Lio revealed that the title is a reference to her late son Diego who died during the recording of the album, as the word geoid is an anagramme of his name The cover was created by Esmeralda Dumoulard, Lio's daughter, with Dora Tamazount. Moments from the making of the album can be seen in the 2025 documentary Lio directed by Tristan Le Guillou.

Lio is preparing to tour in 2027 with a concert at the prestigious Paris Olympia on 17 Decembre 2026.

== Track listing ==
Geoid Party In The Sky
No.	Title	Writer(s)	Producer(s)	Length
1.	"L'amour de ma vie"	Betta Lemme; Tikovoï	Dimitri Tikovoï; Clément Aubert; Val Aubert	2:52
2.	"Et puis quoi"	Vendredi sur Mer; Sutus; Simia	Tikovoï; C. Aubert; V. Aubert	2:59
3.	"Fille à mère"	Corine; Sylvain Rabbath	Tikovoï; C. Aubert; V. Aubert	3:25
4.	"J'existe"	Sandra Nicolle	Tikovoï; C. Aubert; V. Aubert	3:08
5.	"Sens interdit"	Sophie Ellis-Bextor; Adé; Tikovoï	Tikovoï; C. Aubert; V. Aubert	3:01
6.	"Amoureuse solo"	Louane	Tikovoï	3:00
7.	"Basta"	Hoshi	Tikovoï; C. Aubert; V. Aubert	3:11
8.	"Lorena"	Jenn Ayache	Tikovoï; C. Aubert; V. Aubert	3:14
9.	"Sur la bouche"	Pascale Geille; girli; Tikovoï	Tikovoï; C. Aubert; V. Aubert	3:48
10.	"De fille en aiguille"	Isia Marie	Tikovoï	3:12

== Personnel ==
- Dimitri Tikovoï – drums, bass, guitars, keyboards, saxophone
- Val Aubert – guitars, percussion
- Clément Aubert – bass, guitars, keyboards, talk-box
- Fiona Brice – string arrangements
- Philippe Avril – sound engineer
- Dan Grech – mix engineer
- Michel Olivier – mix engineer
- John Greenham – mix engineer, mastering
