= Elli et Jacno =

French synth-pop Group

Background information
- Origin: Paris, Île-de-France, France
- Genre: Synth-pop
- Years active: 1979–1984
- Labels: Celluloid Records; Disques Vogue; CBS Disques
- Past members: Elli Medeiros; Jacno

Elli et Jacno was a French 1980s synth-pop group. They were quite successful in France and to some extent in Britain, having been featured once on the front page of Melody Maker magazine.

== History ==
Denis Quilliard (alias Jacno) and Elli Medeiros decided to start a music duo after leaving the punk band The Stinky Toys. Jacno composed and performed the music and Elli wrote and sang the lyrics. Their music was featured in the Eric Rohmer film Full Moon over Paris. They released three albums together before splitting up and beginning solo careers. A compilation Symphonies de Poche was released by Virgin ten years later.

== Discography ==
- Tout va sauter (1980, Vogue)
- Inédits 77-81 (1981, compilation, Vogue)
- Boomerang (1982, Celluloid)
- Les Nuits de la Pleine Lune (1984, CBS)
- Symphonies de Poche (1994, compilation, Virgin)
