= Chakra Bam =

Nepali singer

Chakra Bam चक्र बम
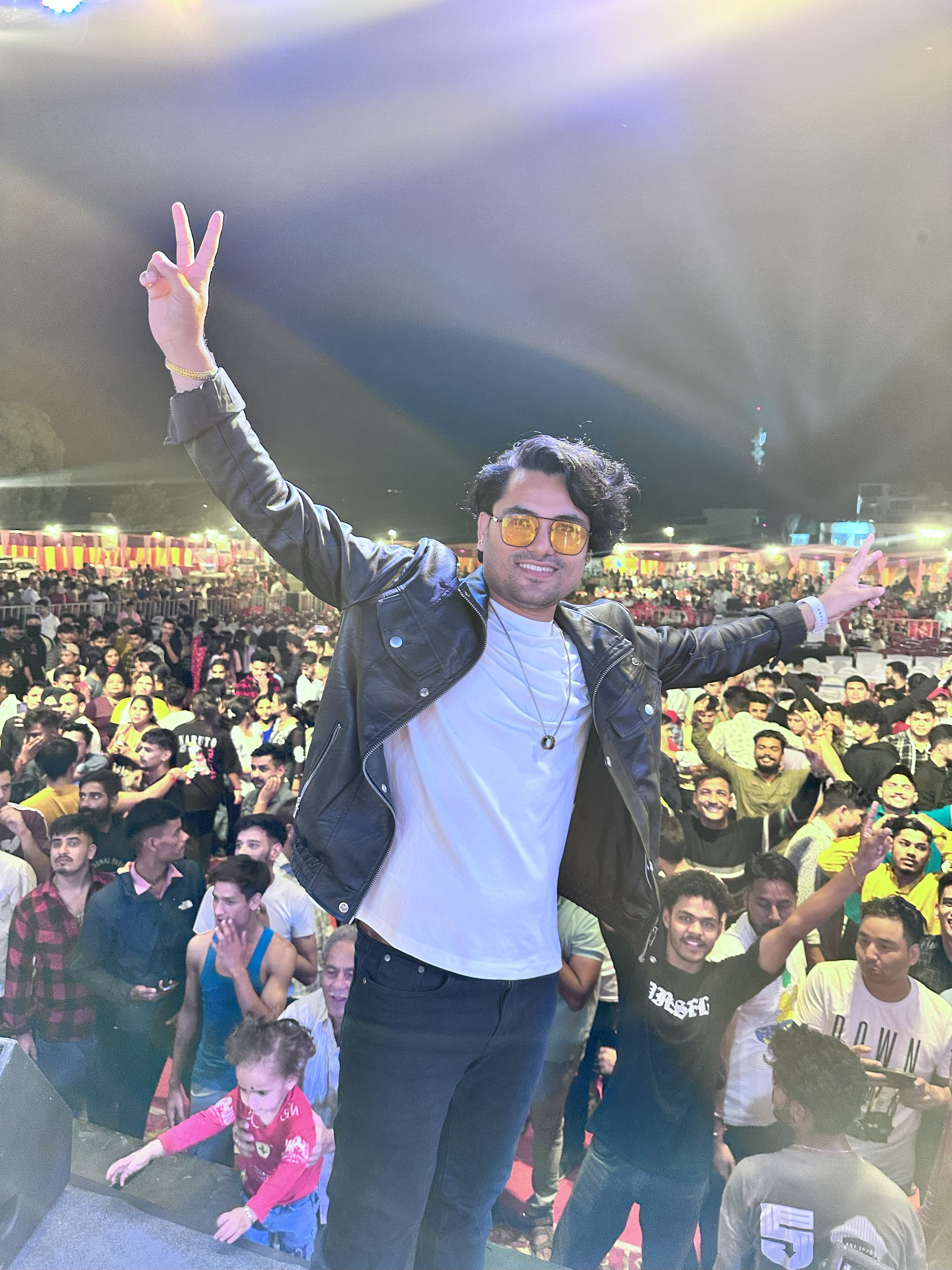

Background information
- Born: March 20, 1993 (age 33); Sudurpashim, Kailali, Nepal
- Occupation: Singer / Model

Chakra Bam (Nepali: चक्र बम; born 20 march 1993) is a singer and model from the Kailali district of Nepal. Bam sings lok pop, lok dohori, and modern generation music. The majority of the songs he sings belong to the Deuda genre.

== About ==
Bam Start his modeling career from 2070 BS with debut song "Mota Chamal" and singing career from his first song "Nach Meri Jhuma". Till June 2025 he has acted in over 250 music videos. "Karnali Tira", "Oya Jhuma", "Bhan Sali", and "Bambai Janye Rail", "Oya Kajal" ,"hey Suwa" are some popular song in his musical journey. He writes songs, sings, and dances, and has his own unique style of singing that emphasizes the dialect used in his songs. They sing songs that reflect the glory of the Far Western region of Nepal, which lies in the western part of Nepal. The western part of nepal follow Deuda cultural. Over the past five years, he sing's more than 100 songs . He has been awarded from different national awards.

== Awards ==
Year	Award	Category	Result	Ref.
2020	National Power News Music Award	Best Deuda Music	Won	
2022	NIM Awards	Best Deuda model	Won	
2022	Rastriya Samabeshi Music Award	Best Deuda model	Won	
2023	OS Nepal music award	Best Deuda male singer	Won	

== Songs ==
SN	Song name	Release date	Ref
1	Udhi aa Suwa	-	
2	Oi Kajal		
3	Bhan Sali	-	
4	He suwa	-	
5	Soltini	-	
6	Nach Bhunti Nach	-	
7	Gajal	-	
8	ko ho ko ho	-	
