= Bam (nickname) =

Bam is a nickname. Notable people with the name include:

- Bam Adebayo (born 1997), American basketball player
- Bam Aquino (born 1977), Filipino politician
- Bam Childress (born 1982), American retired National Football League player
- Bam Cunningham (1950–2021), American retired National Football League player
- Bam Margera (born 1979), professional skateboarder and television personality
- Bam Martin-Scott (born 2000), American football player
- Bam Morris (born 1972), American retired National Football League player

== See also ==
- Bam Bam (disambiguation)
