= Ben Ryan =

Ben Ryan may refer to:

- Ben Ryan (composer) (1892–1968), American songwriter
- Ben Ryan (rugby union) (born 1971), Fiji sevens head coach
- Ben Ryan (umpire), Australian rules football umpire
- Benjamin Ryan (keyboardist), founding member of English extreme metal band Cradle of Filth
