= Looking for Saint Tropez =

Studio album by Telex
- Released: 1979
- Recorded: Telex Sound Studio
- Genre: Synth-pop; new wave; post-disco; electro
- Length: 31:49
- Label: RKM; Sire; Disques Vogue / Le Maquis (2003); Windmill / Alfa (1994)
- Producer: Telex

Telex chronology
Looking for Saint Tropez (1979)	Neurovision (1980)

Singles from Looking for Saint Tropez
- 1. "Twist À Saint Tropez" Released: August 1978; 2. "Moskow Diskow" Released: June 1979; 3. "Rock Around the Clock" Released: July 1979

Professional ratings
Review scores
Source	Rating
Music Week	2/4 stars
Pitchfork	6.6
Smash Hits	6/10

Looking for Saint Tropez is the debut studio album of Belgian electronic band Telex, released in 1979.

== Track listings ==
=== Original ===
No.	Title	Length
1.	"Moskow Diskow"	4:12
2.	"Pakmoväst"	3:42
3.	"Café De La Jungle"	1:07
4.	"Ça Plane Pour Moi"	5:25
5.	"Some Day/Un Jour"	1:12
6.	"Something To Say"	5:02
7.	"Rock Around the Clock"	3:56
8.	"Victime De La Société"	3:54
9.	"Twist À Saint Tropez"	3:19

=== Bonus tracks ===
==== Japan (CD #ALCA-557, Alfa Records) (1994) ====
No.	Title	Length
10.	"Moskow Diskow (Remix Américain)"
11.	"Le Fond De L'Air Est Rouge"

==== France (CD #LM54070, Le Maquis) (2003) ====
No.	Title	Length
10.	"Moskow Diskow (maxi)"	5:22
11.	"Le Fond De L'Air Est Rouge"	3:21
12.	"Victime De La Société #1"	3:54
13.	"Quelque Chose À Dire"	5:12
14.	"Avec Fifi"	4:00

== Charts ==
Chart (1979)	Peak position
Australia (Kent Music Report)	52
