= Mohan Bam =

Nepalese judoka (born 1991)

Personal information
- Nickname: Mohan Judo
- Nationality: Nepali
- Born: 12 June 1991 (age 35) Kailali, Nepal
- Height: 1.60 m (5 ft 3 in)
- Weight: 60 kg (132 lb)
- Spouse: Kathryn Milroy

Sport
- Country: Nepal
- Sport: Judo
- Event: 60 kg
- Now coaching: Kano Judo Club, Warrnambool Australia

Achievements and titles
- National finals: 2018 - Gold Medal - Australian National Championships (Nage no Kata) 2017 - Gold Medal - Australian National Championships (Nage no Kata) 2016 - Gold Medal - Australian National Championships (Nage no Kata) 2015 - Gold Medal - Australian National Championships (Nage no Kata) 2014 - Gold Medal - Australian National Championships (Nage no Kata)

Mohan Bam, also known as Mohan Judo ( Nepali : मोहन बम, born 12 June 1991), is a Nepalese judoka winning the gold medal at 39th Australian Judo Championship, First South Asian Sambo Championship and Oceania Judo Union Kata Championship, bronze medal at Southern Cross International Open Judo Championship organised by Australian Judo Federation in 2014.

In 2018, Mohan competed in the Hohhot Grand Prix (China), he returned to Australia in time to compete in the Australian National Championships held on the Gold Coast, Queensland where he won, with partner Edmund Yuen, the Gold Medal in Nage no Kata, for the 5th consecutive year.

Mohan Bam has spent most of 2018 and 2019 competing on the Olympic World Judo Circuit having competed in Baku at the World Championships and attending the Budapest Grand Slam, Zagreb Grand Prix and Tokyo World Championships.

In 2019 Bam was a facilitator of the Judo World Tour where a small group of Judoka from France and Ireland travelled to Nepal to share knowledge and skills.

Bam also had featured at 127 judo techniques with Olympian Matt D'Aquino at Hills Sports Academy of Canberra, Australia.

2022 sees Mohan Bam open a new Judo Club in Warrnambool, Victoria, Australia. It is the first time Judo has been offered in the sea-side city for many years.
