= Bam (crater) =

Crater on Mars

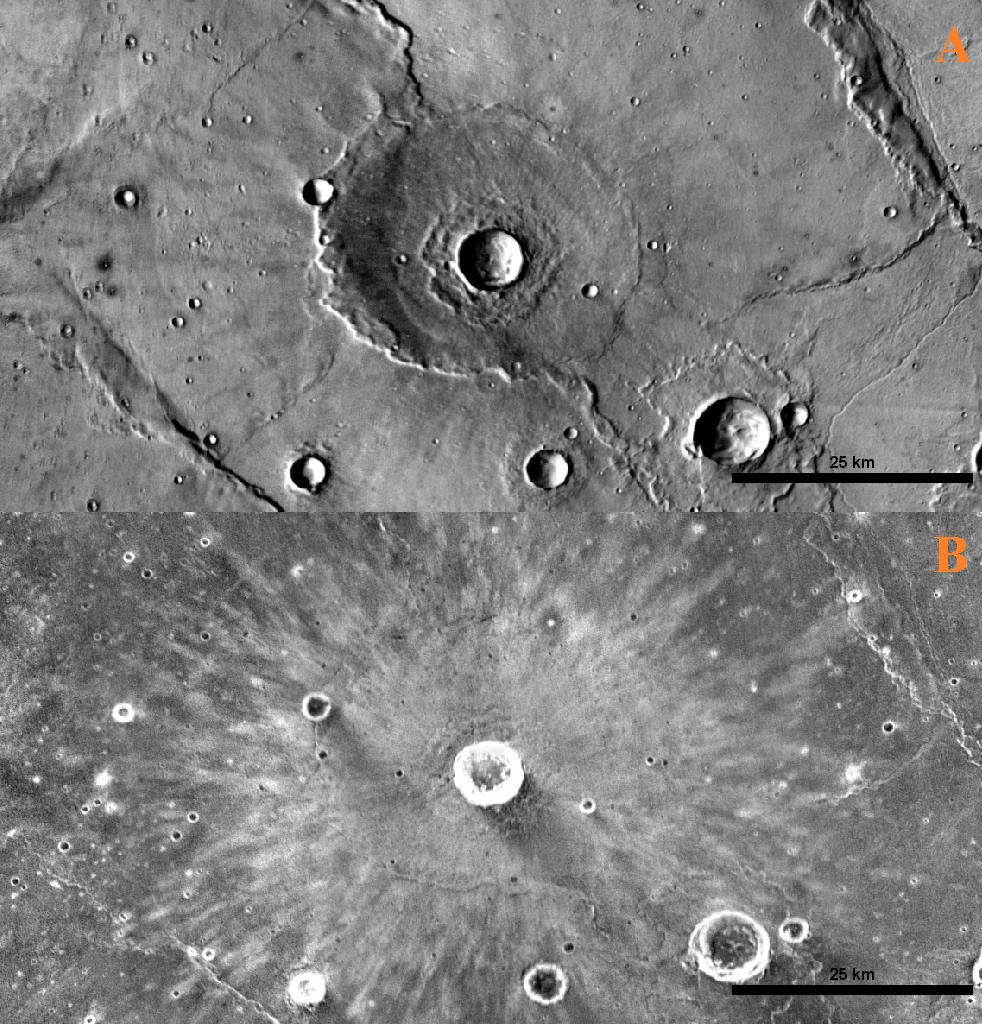
THEMIS Day and Night IR images of Bam Crater.

Bam is an impact crater located on the lava plains of Hesperia Planum (Mare Tyrrhenum quadrangle) on Mars at 25.79 ° S and 115.67° E, approximately 6.8 kilometers in diameter. It was named after a city in the Kerman province of Iran, having had its name approved in April 2017.

Bam is considered to be one of the best well-preserved examples of impact craters on Mars, considering the overall crater morphology, thermophysical signatures, and the relatively young age of its target material.

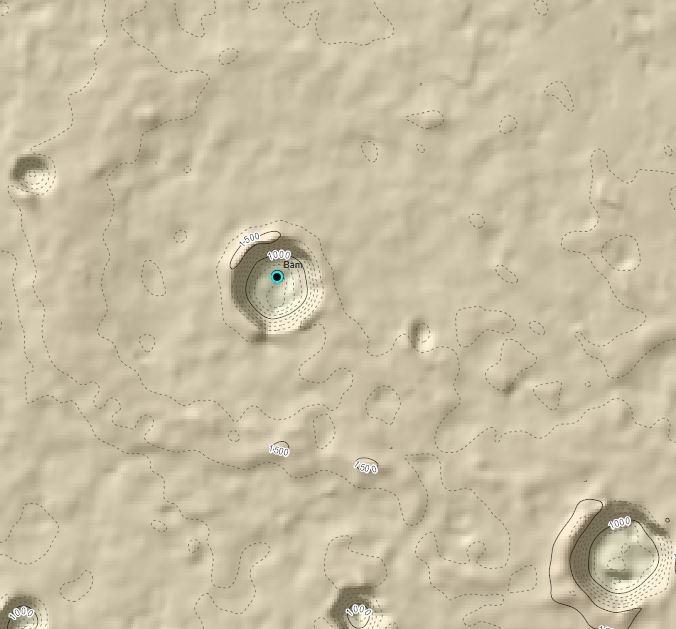
Bam crater sits nearly at areoid with the highest point on the northwest quadrant of the rim at 1500 meters above areoid and the deepest part at 700 meters above areoid.
