= Les Sucettes =

French pop song performed by France Gall

- Cover of the EP Les Sucettes

Song by France Gall

from the EP Les Sucettes
- A-side: "Les Sucettes" "Quand on est ensemble"
- B-side: "Ça me fait rire" "Je me marie en blanc"
- Released: March 1966
- Genre: Yé-yé
- Label: Philips
- Songwriter: Serge Gainsbourg

Music video
- "Les Sucettes" on YouTube

"Les Sucettes" (transl. "Lollipops") is a French pop song written by Serge Gainsbourg and first recorded by France Gall in 1966. One of Gall's biggest hits, it was an unusually risqué song for its time, containing numerous sexually charged double-entendres, although she had said that she was unaware of this at the time.

== Meaning ==
"Les Sucettes" is, on the surface, a yé-yé song about a girl named Annie who likes anise-flavored lollipops; the lyrics play with the homophony of "Annie" and "anis" (anise). However, the lyrics are laden with double-entendres referring to fellatio, such as a line about barley sugar running down Annie's throat. The very noun for lollipop in French, "sucette", is the substantivised verb "sucer", sucking; the title and the refrain ("Annie aime les sucettes", "Annie loves lollipops") are far more evocative in French than in the English translation. A possible translation to preserve the innuendo would be "Annie loves suckers". The line "pour quelques pennies" (for a few pennies) can also be heard as "pour quelques pénis" (for a few penises).

== Music video ==
A promotional video clip for the song was directed by Jean-Christophe Averty for the TV show Au risque de vous plaire ("At the Risk of Pleasing You"). The clip echoed the song's sexual subtext, with footage of dancers in phallic lollipop costumes interspersed with cutaways of young women suggestively sucking on lollipops.

Another video was filmed, featuring Gall herself in a schoolgirl uniform singing the song.

== Reaction ==
Upon its release, the song was a success in France and Belgium. In France, it entered the charts at #30 on July 15, and by the following week, it had climbed to its peak of #9.

Gall had said that she did not understand the song's subtext when she recorded it at age 18. By Gall's account, she did not realize until later why the filming of the clip attracted so many visitors to the set. She was then upset – "mortified, hiding herself away for weeks, refusing to face anyone". Gall said that she had sung Gainsbourg's songs "with an innocence of which I'm proud" and "was pained to then learn that he had turned the situation to his advantage, mocking me." In a 2001 television interview, Gall said that she had felt "betrayed by the adults around me" afterwards.

Gainsbourg called the song "the most daring song of the century" in an interview with the magazine Rock and Folk.

== Charts ==
Chart (1966)	Peak position
Belgium (Wallonia Ultratop 50 Singles)	14
France (Hit Parade de Salut les copains)	9

== Covers ==
=== Kim Kay version ===
"Les Sucettes"

Single by Kim Kay

from the album Hits!
- Released: 2000
- Recorded: 2000 at Sterman & Cook Studio
- Genre: Eurodance
- Length: 3:26
- Label: EMI
- Songwriter: Serge Gainsbourg
- Producers: Phil Sterman; Lov Cook

Kim Kay singles chronology
"Ça plane pour moi" (2000)	"Les Sucettes" (2000)	"Open Your Heart" (2001)

Music video
- "Les Sucettes" on YouTube

Belgian Eurodance singer Kim Kay recorded a cover of "Les Sucettes" that released in 2000 on EMI as the fourth single and as well as the opening track from her only compilation album, Hits! (2000). The single was produced by Phil Sterman and Lov Cook.

Track listing
No.	Title	Length
1.	"Les Sucettes"	3:26
2.	"Lilali" (mellow mix)	2:50

=== Other covers ===
- Gainsbourg recorded his own version, with a psychedelic arrangement, on the 1969 album Jane Birkin/Serge Gainsbourg.
- The song was performed by Luce as a contestant on the eighth season of the French TV singing competition Nouvelle Star in 2010.
- The song was covered by the Swedish symphonic metal band Therion in the album Les Fleurs du Mal, released in September 2012.
