= Bam Bam =

Bam Bam may refer to:

== People ==
- Bam Bam (nickname)
- Bamm-Bamm Rubble, sometimes spelled Bam-Bam, a character on the 1960s animated television show The Flintstones
- Bam Bam (radio presenter) (born 1970), UK personality
- Bam Bam (wrestler) (born 1985), Mexican professional wrestler
- Bam Bam Bigelow (1961–2007), American professional wrestler
- BamBam (born 1997), Thai rapper and singer
- Terry Gordy (1961–2001), American professional wrestler
- Tai Tuivasa (born 1993), Australian rugby league player turned mixed martial artist of Samoan descent

== Music ==
- Bam Bam (band), American pop band created by Chris Westbrook
- Bam Bam, Seattle band founded by Tina Bell in 1983
- "Bam Bam" (Sister Nancy song), 1982
- "Bam Bam" (Camila Cabello song), 2022
- "Bam bam" (Kim Kay song), 1999
- "Bam Bam", a 2011 song by King Charles (musician)
- "Bam Bam", a 1966 song by the Maytals
- "Bambam", a 2019 single by Ängie
- Bam Bam riddim, a popular dancehall riddim by Sly & Robbie, first used in the Chaka Demus & Pliers songs "Bam Bam" and "Murder She Wrote"

== Other uses ==
- Bambam language, a language spoken in Indonesia

== See also ==
- Bang Bang (disambiguation)
