= Kim Kay =

Belgian singer (born 1978)

- Born: Kim Van Hee; 22 February 1978 (age 48); Dendermonde, Belgium
- Genres: Eurodance
- Occupation: Artist/Singer
- Years active: 1998–2004, 2015–present
- Label: EMI

Kim Van Hee (born 22 February 1978), better known by her stage name Kim Kay is a Belgian pop singer. She is Flemish, though she is known for delivering vocals in French. Kay took part in the Belgian preselection of the 2002 Eurovision Song Contest with a song called The Sun Shines. Kim Kay's arguably most famous work is her dance single "Lilali", which was a hit in Europe, beyond Belgium and France, where she booked her overall greatest successes throughout her career.

Kay lives in Wichelen and studies psychology in Ghent. In 2004, she was diagnosed with cervical cancer.

== Discography ==
=== Albums ===
- La Vie en lilali (1998)
  - 1. "Lilali"
  - 2. "Bam bam"
  - 3. "Le Banana Split"
  - 4. "Iniminimanimo"
  - 5. "Donne-moi"
  - 6. "Oui oh oui"
  - 7. "Tout simplement"
  - 8. "Amoureux solitaires"
  - 9. "À nous"
  - 10. "99 Luftballons"
  - 11. "Je danse"
  - 12. "Poupée de cire, poupée de son" (remix)
  - 13. "Lilali" (speedgarage mix)
- Hits! (2000)
  - 1. "Les Sucettes"
  - 2. "Bam bam"
  - 3. "Hula hop"
  - 4. "Poupée de cire, poupée de son"
  - 5. "Les Vacances d'été"
  - 6. "Touche à tout"
  - 7. "Ça plane pour moi"
  - 8. "Oui oh oui"
  - 9. "Le Banana Split"
  - 10. "La Dah-li-danse"
  - 11. "Iniminimanimo"
  - 12. "Lilali"
  - 13. "Bam bam" (speedgarage mix)
  - 14. "Poupée de cire, poupée de son" (club mix)
  - 15. "La Dah-li-danse" (dolly family mix)
  - 16. "Lilali" (mellow mix)

=== Singles ===
- "Lilali" (1998)
- "Oui oh oui" (1998)
- "Poupée de cire, poupée de son" (1998)
- "Bam bam" (1999)
- "Iniminimanimo" (1999)
- "La Dah-li-danse" (2000)
- "Les Vacances d'été" (2000)
- "Ça plane pour moi" (2000)
- "Les Sucettes" (2000)
- "Open Your Heart" (2001)
- "Direction le soleil" / "The Sun Shines" (2002)
- "Abracadabrant" (2003)
