= Bam (neighborhood) =

Bam is a neighbourhood of Tirana, Albania. It is located west of the central boulevard.
