= Bam, Amur Oblast =

Bam Бам
- Station
- Location within Amur Oblast Location within Russia
- Coordinates: 54°07′N 123°41′E
- Country: Russia
- Region: Amur Oblast
- District: Skovorodinsky District
- Time zone: UTC+9:00

Bam (Russian: Бам) is a rural locality (a station) in Solnechny Selsoviet of Skovorodinsky District, Amur Oblast, Russia. The population was 876 as of 2018.

== Geography ==
Bam is located 36 km northwest of Skovorodino (the district's administrative centre) by road. Solnechny is the nearest rural locality.
