= Stinky Toys =

French punk rock band

- Origin: Paris, France
- Genres: Punk rock, new wave
- Years active: 1976–1979
- Label: Polydor
- Past members: Elli Medeiros; Denis Quilliard, a.k.a. Jacno; Bruno Carone; Albin Dériat; Hervé Zénouda

Stinky Toys were a French punk rock band from Paris which formed in 1976 and featured Elli Medeiros (vocals), Denis Quilliard, alias Jacno, (a.k.a. Jan Colrth) (rhythm guitar), Bruno Carone (lead guitar), Albin Dériat (bass guitar), and Hervé Zénouda (drums).

== History ==
One of the first French new wave and punk rock bands, in 1976 the band took part in the 100 Club Punk Festival in London, sharing the bill with such bands as Sex Pistols, the Clash, the Damned, Siouxsie and the Banshees, and Buzzcocks.

A single was released in a picture cover on Polydor Records in 1977, "Boozy Creed", with "Driver Blues" on the B-side. The single met with mixed reviews, causing Polydor to abandon the release of the band's eponymous debut album outside France. The album was described by AllMusic as "a largely flat, bland collection of recycled Stones and New York Dolls riffs with low-quality vocals", while Trouser Press were also not impressed with what they described as "uninspired sub-Rolling Stones rock'n'boogie with terrible vocals by Elli Medeiros".

The band split up in 1979, with Elli Medeiros and Jacno then forming the duo Elli et Jacno. Medeiros went on to a solo career, releasing the Bom Bom... album in 1987. Jacno later released several solo albums as well as working with several other artists including Mareva Galanter.

Medeiros was chosen by Dev Hynes as part of his 'Fantasy Band' in 2008.

== Discography ==
- "Boozy Creed" 7-inch single (1977) Polydor
- Stinky Toys LP (1977) Polydor (reissued in 1990 as Plastic Faces by Universal Records)
- Stinky Toys LP (1979) Vogue
