= Telex (band) =

Belgian synth-pop band

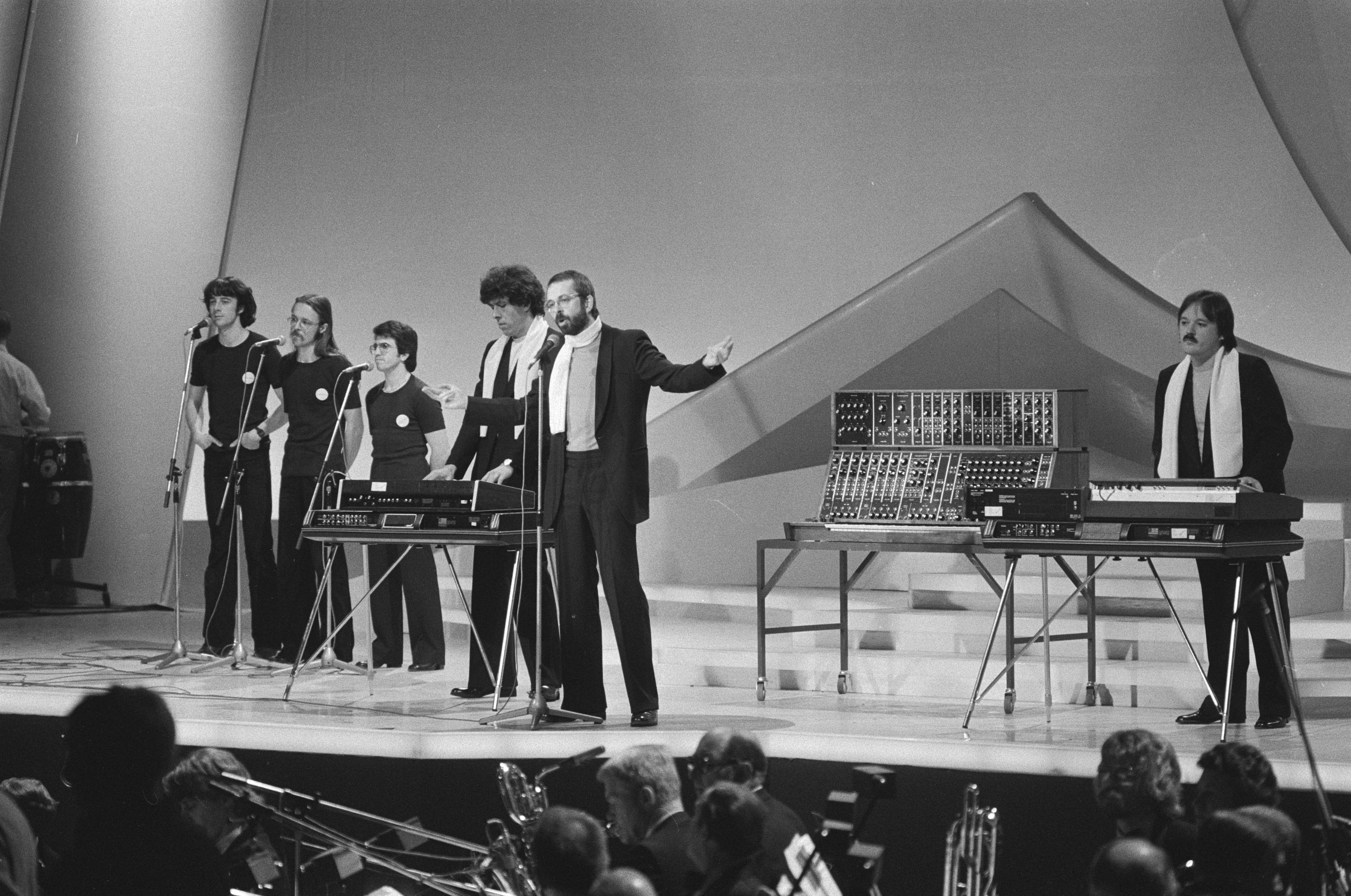
- Telex at a rehearsal for the Eurovision Song Contest 1980

Background information
- Origin: Brussels, Belgium
- Genres: Synth-pop; new wave; electronic; avant-garde; dance; experimental; house; electro; disco; post-disco
- Years active: 1978–2006; 2009 (Note: Hiatus in new music between 1989–2005)
- Labels: RKM; Disques Vogue; Virgin; Sire/Warner; Atlantic; EMI; Alfa; Mute
- Past members: Dan Lacksman; Michel Moers; Marc Moulin

Telex was a Belgian synth-pop group formed in 1978 by Marc Moulin, Dan Lacksman and Michel Moers, with the intention of "making something really European, different from rock, without guitar—and the idea was electronic music".

== History ==
In 1979, mixing the aesthetics of disco, punk and experimental electronic music, they released a stripped-down synthesized cover version of "Twist à St. Tropez" by Les Chats Sauvages. They followed up with an ultra-slow cover of "Rock Around the Clock", a relaxed and dispassionate version of Plastic Bertrand's punk song "Ça Plane Pour Moi", and a mechanical cover of "Dance to the Music", originally by Sly Stone. Telex built its music entirely from electronic instruments, employing joyously irreverent humor. The group's debut album, Looking for Saint Tropez, featured the worldwide hit single "Moskow Diskow".

In 1980, Telex's manager asked the group to enter the Eurovision Song Contest. The group entered and were eventually sent to the finals, although they apparently hoped to come in last.

"We had hoped to finish last, but Portugal decided otherwise. We got ten points from them and finished on the 19th spot."

— Marc Moulin

The group's song "Euro-Vision" was a cheerful bleepy song with deliberately banal lyrics about the Eurovision Song Contest, which they competed with in 1980 and placed 17th of 19 with 14 points.

For their third album, Sex, Telex enlisted the US group Sparks to help write the lyrics. However, the band still refused to play live and preferred to remain anonymous—common practice in the techno music artists the group later inspired but, nevertheless, unusual in 1981. The fourth Telex album, Wonderful World, was barely distributed. In 1986, Atlantic Records signed Telex and released the album Looney Tunes in 1988. In 1989, Telex revisited their old tracks and remixed them to resemble house music and other genres then prevalent in electronic pop. The result was Les Rythmes Automatiques, released in 1989. After a long hiatus, Telex returned in March 2006 with How Do You Dance on EMI Records. It contained five original compositions as well as five covers. The group's last single was a cover of "On the Road Again", originally by Canned Heat. They also produced remixes for other artists' single releases, including "A Pain That I'm Used To" by Depeche Mode and "Minimal" by the Pet Shop Boys.

Following the death of band member Marc Moulin in 2008, the surviving members of the band announced their retirement from making music with the band's final release, a compilation album titled Ultimate.

== Discography ==
=== Albums ===
- 1979: Looking for Saint Tropez
- 1980: Neurovision
- 1981: Sex (released in some countries as "Birds and Bees" with a slightly altered track listing)
- 1984: Wonderful World
- 1988: Looney Tunes
- 2006: How Do You Dance?

=== Compilations and remix albums ===
- 1982: More Than Distance (includes singles, album tracks, B sides, and newly remixed/recorded tracks, two with English lyrics by Jo Callis)
- 1989: Les Rythmes Automatiques (album of re-recorded back-catalogue)
- 1993: Belgium...One Point (a box set of the first five albums plus bonus tracks)
- 1994: Is Release a Humour? – We Love Telex (Japan only. remixed by Japanese DJs)
- 1998: I Don't Like Music (remixed by Carl Craig and others)
- 1998: I Don't Like Remixes: Original Classics 78–86 (a 'best-of' compilation)
- 1999: I (Still) Don't Like Music Remixes Vol. 2 (DJ remixes)
- 2009: Ultimate Best Of
- 2021: This Is Telex (1978–2006 tracks newly mixed with 2 unreleased covers—"Dear Prudence" from the Beatles and "The Beat Goes On" from Sonny & Cher)

== Notes ==
Preceded by Micha Marah with "Hey Nana"	Belgium in the Eurovision Song Contest; 1980	Succeeded by Emly Starr with "Samson"
