= Bam bam (Kim Kay song) =

Single by Kim Kay

from the album La Vie en lilali
- Released: 1999
- Recorded: 1999 at Sterman & Cook Studio
- Genre: Eurodance
- Length: 3:30
- Label: EMI
- Songwriters: Peter Gillis; Miguel Wiels; Stef Corbesier
- Producers: Phil Sterman; Lov Cook

Kim Kay singles chronology
"Poupée de cire, poupée de son" (1998)	"Bam bam" (1999)	"Iniminimanimo" (1999)

Music video
- "Bam bam" on YouTube

"Bam bam" is a song by the Belgian Eurodance singer Kim Kay. It was released in 1999 on EMI as the fourth single and as well as the second track from her debut studio album, La Vie en lilali (1998). It is a Eurodance song that was written by Peter Gillis, Miguel Wiels, and Stef Corbesier and produced by Phil Sterman and Lov Cook.

== Track listing ==
Belgium CD single
No.	Title	Writer(s)	Length
1.	"Bam bam" (radio edit)	Peter Gillis; Miguel Wiels; Stef Corbesier	3:30
2.	"Je danse"	Sidro; Ilbe; S. Corbesier	3:05

France CD single
No.	Title	Writer(s)	Length
1.	"Bam bam" (album version)	Peter Gillis; Miguel Wiels; Stef Corbesier	3:30
2.	"Bam bam" (single version)	P. Gillis; M. Wiels; S. Corbesier	3:30
3.	"Je danse"	Sidro; Ilbe; S. Corbesier	3:05

France 12" maxi single A-side
No.	Title	Writer(s)	Length
1.	"Bam bam" (S&C mix)	Peter Gillis; Miguel Wiels; Stef Corbesier	6:03

B-side
No.	Title	Writer(s)	Length
1.	"Bam bam" (E&T mix)	P. Gillis; M. Wiels; S. Corbesier	4:59

== Charts ==
Chart (1999)	Peak position
Belgium (Ultratop 50 Flanders)	50
