= Jacno =

French musician

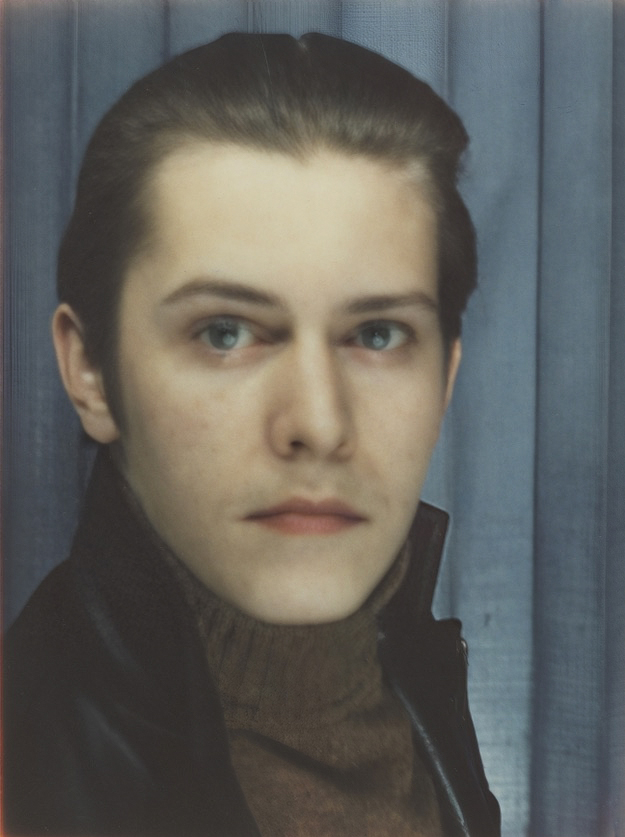
Image of Jacno

Jacno (3 July 1957 in Paris – 6 November 2009) was a French musician.

Born as Denis Quilliard, he was a founding member of the first French punk band The Stinky Toys. In the early 1980s, after the group disbanded, he teamed up with former Stinky Toys singer Elli Medeiros to form the pop duo Elli et Jacno. Jacno had also released a number of solo albums since 1979.

He took his professional name from the name of the graphic artist who drew the Gallic helmet logo of French Gauloises cigarettes brand.

In 1999, the Italian DJ Gigi D'Agostino used the track Rectangle for his song La Passion. The song was a hit in Austria and Belgium where it became a number-one single, and was very popular in other European countries.

Jacno died in the night of the 5 and 6 November 2009 from cancer, aged 52.

== Discography ==
Solo

- Jacno. Celluloid, 1979 (collaboration with Elli Medeiros).
- Rectangle. Celluloid, 1979
- Tant de baisers perdus, single, 1985 (lyrics by Françoise Hardy).
- T'es loin, t'es près. Barclay, 1988 (collaboration with Pauline Lafont).
- Une idée derrière la tête. Barclay, 1991 (collaborations with Jacques Higelin, Paul Personne, Gérard Blanchard, Etienne Daho and Elli Medeiros).
- Faux témoin. Polygram, 1995 (collaboration with Etienne Daho).
- La Part des anges. Mélodie/Sony Music, 1999 (collaboration with Les Valentins).
- French paradoxe. Emma/Wagram, 2002 (collaborations with Helena Noguerra, Miossec, Thomas Dutronc, Arthur H).
- Tant de temps. Warner Music, 2006 (collaboration with Françoise Cactus from Stereo Total).

Elli et Jacno

- Singles

- "Main dans la main" / "T'oublier" (1980)
- "Oh là la" / "Je t'aime tant" (1981)
- "Je t'aime tant" / "Chanson pour Olivia" (1982)
- "Le téléphone" / "Le téléphone" (instrumental) (1982)

- Albums

- 1980 : Tout va sauter (Vogue)
- 1982 : Boomerang (Celluloïd)
- 1984 : Les nuits de la pleine lune (CBS)

- Compilation

- 1981 : Inédits 77-81 (Vogue)

As producer, composer and/or arranger

- 1980 : "Amoureux solitaires" for Lio (new version of "Lonely Lovers" by Stinky Toys, lyrics by Elli Medeiros) - great success in Europe
- 1980 : "Disco-rough" for Mathématiques Modernes - "single of the week" par the NME
- 1981 : Mythomane for Étienne Daho (his first album)
- 1986 : "Oh la la" for Pauline Lafont, single (lyrics by Etienne Daho)
- 1987 : Sous influence divine for Daniel Darc (his first solo album)
- 1988 : "Ne m'oublie pas" for Pauline Lafont, single (lyrics by Etienne Daho)
- 1988 : Tombé du ciel for Jacques Higelin

As writer

- "J'ai triste" for Les Valentins
- "Le Bourdon" for Paul Personne

Duets

- "D'une rive à l'autre" with Romane Bohringer, 1994
- "Je fume pu d'shit" with Stupeflip, 2002
- "Bang Bang" and "Ne Dis Rien" in Ukuyéyé by Mareva Galanter, 2006

Tribute

- Jacno Future, 2011
