= Oui oh oui =

Single by Kim Kay

from the album La Vie en lilali
- Released: 1998
- Recorded: 1998 at Sterman & Cook Studio
- Genre: Eurodance
- Length: 2:51
- Label: EMI
- Songwriters: Wim Claes; Katrien Gillis; Guido Veulemans
- Producers: Phil Sterman; Lov Cook

Kim Kay singles chronology
"Lilali" (1998)	"Oui oh oui" (1998)	"Poupée de cire, poupée de son" (1998)

Music video
- "Oui oh oui" on YouTube

"Oui oh oui" is a song by the Belgian Eurodance singer Kim Kay. It was released in 1998 on EMI as the second single and as well as the sixth track from her debut studio album, La Vie en lilali (1998). It is a Eurodance song that was written by Wim Claes, Katrien Gillis, and Guido Veulemans and produced by Phil Sterman and Lov Cook.

== Track listing ==
No.	Title	Length
1.	"Oui oh oui" (radio edit)	2:50
2.	"Oui oh oui" (the happy mix)	2:50

== Charts ==
Chart (1998)	Peak position
Belgium (Ultratop 50 Flanders)	15
