= Wim Claes =

Belgian composer, arranger, and music producer

- Born: 29 June 1961; Belgium
- Died: 24 February 2018 (aged 56)
- Occupations: Composer, arranger, music producer, songwriter
- Years active: 1990s–2018
- Known for: "Like The Wind", Belgium's entry in the Eurovision Song Contest 1999, member of DJ Peter Project
- Notable work: "Like The Wind", "Oui oh oui", "Lilali"

Wim Claes (29 June 1961 – 24 February 2018) was a Belgian composer, arranger and music producer. As a songwriter, he was best known for "Like The Wind", Belgium's entry in the Eurovision Song Contest 1999, sung by Vanessa Chinitor. He was also a member of the Eurodance group DJ Peter Project.

"Like the Wind", which finished 12th in the contest and reached no 3 in the Belgian charts, was performed in English, in accordance with new rules introduced that year. Other successful co-written by Claes included "Oui oh oui" and "Lilali", both sung by Kim Kay, which reached no 15 and no 4 respectively in the Belgian charts.
