= Dan Lacksman =

Belgian composer and sound engineer (born 1950)

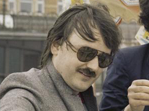
- Lacksman in 1980

Background information
- Also known as: Dan Lacksman Association; Electronic System; Transvolta; Pangea
- Born: Daniel Pierre Lanckmans; 19 May 1950 (age 75); Werl, Germany
- Origin: Brussels-City, Brussels, Belgium
- Genres: Electronic; avant-garde; synth-pop; post-disco
- Occupations: Composer; sound engineer; music producer
- Instruments: Synthesizer
- Label: 17
- Formerly of: Dan Lacksman's Alliance; Telex
- Website: danlacksman.be

Dan Lacksman (born 19 May 1950) is a Belgian composer and sound engineer, artist and member of Telex, director of numerous acoustic albums, pop or jazz.

He released the album Electric Dreams on 17 May 2013.

== Biography ==
Dan Lacksman was born in Werl. He started learning music and piano when he was 12 years old. A year later, he received a tape recorder and a guitar for Christmas; he formed a band with school friends. They were playing songs of the Shadows, and some early compositions.

He then discovered the music of the Beatles with their huge hit "She Loves You", and started composing more intensely, recording demo songs in his parents' dining room, which gradually became his first home studio, with the purchase of a second tape recorder and more instruments like a drumkit and a second-hand Fender Jazz Bass.

In those days he composed the music of a song which would become later "Laat me nu toch niet alleen", made successful by Belgian artist Johan Verminnen, and more recently by the group Clouseau.

In 1968, after high school, he decided to become a professional recording engineer. After a few months in a specialised school, frustrated by the slowness of the studies and the lack of practice, he looked for something more "in the field", and was lucky enough to find a job as tape-operator in Studio Madeleine, in Brussels. Working every day in a "hit making" studio with some of the top engineers and musicians in Belgium was a dream come true for Dan.

He soon became captivated by synthesizers, and thanks to his family, bought his first one (the first one in Belgium) in 1970. It was an EMS VCS 3, and Lacksman still owns it: it is part of his collection of vintage analog synthesizers.

As composer and artist, he had several international hit records in the seventies, and was working as a synthesizer specialist in Belgian and European studios for a lot of famous artists like Patrick Hernandez (more than 25 million records sold with "Born to Be Alive"), Plastic Bertrand and Thijs Van Leer, from the Dutch band Focus.

Lacksman recorded an album and several singles under his name, and also several instrumental albums of electronic music, using mainly a big Moog modular system, under the name Electronic System.

In 1978, he founded the then avant-garde electronic band Telex together with Marc Moulin and Michel Moers. They had some international hits like "Moskow Diskow", "Spike Jones" and "Peanuts".

In 1979, he co-produced with Marc Moulin Lio's first album, and her first multi-million selling single, "Le Banana Split".

In 1980, he founded Synsound studio I in Brussels, and has worked there with many Belgian and international artists like Sparks, Alain Chamfort, Etienne Daho, and Haruomi Hosono from Yellow Magic Orchestra. In 1983, he recorded Thomas Dolby's second album, The Flat Earth.

In 1990, he co-produced with Sacha Chaty, and engineered two albums of French female vocalist, Sara Mandiano, which included her biggest hit "J'ai des doutes". He also co-produced and engineered for the German label Metronome, Camouflage's albums Methods of Silence and Bodega Bohemia.

In March 1995, he opened the second Synsound studio in an old brewery close to his home. The new studio's acoustics were designed by the famous designer Andy Munro (more than 200 studio designs including George Martin's Air studios in London).

He has worked there with artists like Will Tura, Maurane, K's Choice, Clouseau, Ozark Henry, Arno, Marie Daulne (Zap Mama), Youssou N’Dour, Alain Chamfort, Benabar, Eros Ramazzotti, Hooverphonic, David Bowie, Viktor Lazlo...

In 1993 Dan Lacksman produced the first album of Deep Forest which became a huge hit worldwide. In 1996, he produced the first album of Ozark Henry, I'm Seeking Something That Has Already Found Me, and collaborated on the album Pangea.

During all those years, Dan Lacksman has recorded, mixed and produced albums in all genres, including jazz, classic, pop, rock, dance, and of course electronic music, one of his first passions. He has combined the big modular Moog IIIP and more vintage analog synthesizers with some of the best virtual plugin synthesizers to form a powerful electronic music studio.
