= Elli Medeiros =

Uruguayan-French singer and actress (born 1956)

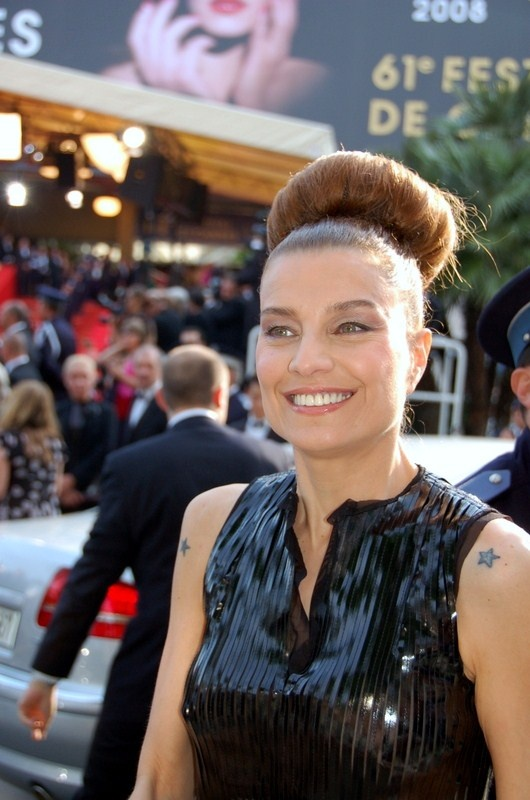
- Medeiros at the 2008 Cannes Film Festival

Background information
- Born: 18 January 1956 (age 70); Montevideo, Uruguay
- Occupations: Singer; actress

Elli Medeiros (born 18 January 1956) is a Uruguayan-French singer and actress.

== Career ==
=== Stinky Toys ===
Originally from Uruguay, Medeiros moved to Paris, France, at the age of 14, dropped out of high school a couple of years later and joined the punk band Stinky Toys.

=== Elli et Jacno ===
After the group disbanded, Medeiros joined another Stinky Toy member Jacno to form the electropop duo Elli et Jacno. Together they released several albums, one of them the soundtrack to an Éric Rohmer film Les nuits de la pleine lune.

=== Solo ===
The singer went solo in 1986. The songs, "Toi mon toit" (1986) and "A bailar calypso" (1987), were big hits in France and had a more Latin sound than her previous records.

She sang back-up vocals on several of pop star Etienne Daho's songs from his 1996 album Eden. She also helped co-write his song "Me manquer" from the same album.

Elli Medeiros appears in a number of French films and has worked with, among others, Olivier Assayas and Philippe Garrel.

== Filmography ==
- 1978: Copyright : Anne
- 1980: Rectangle – Deux chansons de Jacno (music video) : Elli
- 1982: Tokyo no yami (Laissé inachevé à Tokyo)
- 1982: L'Enfant secret : The whore
- 1991: Petits travaux tranquilles : Paule
- 1991: Paris Awakens (Paris s'éveille)
- 1997: Tempête dans un verre d'eau
- 1998: Il suffirait d'un pont
- 1998: Fin août, début septembre
- 1999: Derrière la porte
- 1999: Pourquoi pas moi? : Malou
- 1999: Venus Beauty Institute (Vénus beauté (institut)) : Mlle Evelyne
- 2000: Mamirolle : Irène
- 2000: Paris, mon petit corps est bien las de ce grand monde : The girl
- 2000: Jet Set : Danièle Joubert
- 2002: Lulu : Lulu
- 2002: House Hunting : The girl
- 2003: Rosa la nuit
- 2005: Panorama : The mother
- 2007: After Him (Après lui) : Pauline
- 2008: Leonera : Sofia
- 2018: Amanda : Eve
- 2024: To Live, To Die, To Live Again (Vivre, mourir, renaître)

== Discography ==
- 1977: grey album (Polydor) Stinky Toys
- 1979: yellow album (Vogue) Stinky Toys
- 1980: Tout va sauter (Vogue) Elli et Jacno
- 1981: Inedits 77-81 (Celluloid/EJC/Vogue) Elli et Jacno
- 1982: Boomerang (Celluloid/EJC/ Vogue) Elli et Jacno
- 1984: Les Nuits de la pleine lune Bof 'Les nuits de la pleine lune d'Éric Rohmer (EJC/CBS) Elli et Jacno
- 1987: Bom Bom... (Barclay)
- 1989: Elli (Barclay)
- 1994" Les Symphonies de poche compilation de Elli et Jacno (Virgin)
- 1998: Best of Elli (Barclay)
- 2006: E M (V2)
