= Lilali =

Single by Kim Kay

from the album La Vie en lilali
- Released: 1998
- Recorded: 1998 at Sterman & Cook Studio
- Genre: Eurodance
- Length: 3:23
- Label: EMI
- Songwriters: Guido Veulemans; Wim Claes; Katrien Gillis
- Producers: Phil Sterman; Lov Cook

Kim Kay singles chronology
"Lilali" (1998)	"Oui oh oui" (1998)

Music video
- "Lilali" on YouTube

"Lilali" is a French song by the Belgian Eurodance singer Kim Kay. It was released in 1998 on EMI as the debut single, lead single and as well as the opening track from her debut studio album, La Vie en lilali (1998). It is a dance song that was written by Guido Veulemans, Wim Claes, and Katrien Gillis and produced by Phil Sterman and Lov Cook.

Upon release in 1998, the "Lilali" became a hit in Europe. The song produce over 80,000 copies in Belgium. A year later after its release, a remix of the song were made by the artist and it sold in France over 300,000 copies.

== Track listing ==
Benelux CD single
No.	Title	Length
1.	"Lilali" (radio edit)	3:20
2.	"Lilali" (mellow edit)	3:20

France 12" single A-side
No.	Title	Length
1.	"Lilali" (speedgarage mix)	5:00

B-side
No.	Title	Length
1.	"Lilali" (extended mix)	5:47

France CD single
No.	Title	Length
1.	"Lilali" (radio edit)	3:20
2.	"Lilali" (mellow edit)	3:20
3.	"Lilali" (speedgarage mix)	5:00

Italy 12" single A-side
No.	Title	Length
1.	"Lilali" (radio mix)	3:20
2.	"Lilali" (mellow mix)	3:20

B-side
No.	Title	Length
1.	"Lilali" (extended mix)	5:47
2.	"Lilali" (speed garage version)	5:00

== Charts ==
=== Weekly charts ===
Chart (1998–99)	Peak position
Belgium (Ultratop 50 Flanders)	5
Belgium (Ultratop 50 Wallonia)	4
France (SNEP)	10
Netherlands (Single Top 100)	31

=== Year-end charts ===
Chart (1998)	Position
Belgian (Flanders) Singles Chart	20
Chart (1999)	Position
Belgian (Wallonia) Singles Chart	22

== Certifications ==
Region	Certification	Certified units/sales
Belgium (BRMA)	2× Platinum	100,000^{*}
France (SNEP)	Gold	250,000^{*}
^{*} Sales figures based on certification alone.
