= Marc Moulin =

Belgian musician and journalist (1942–2008)

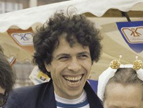
Marc Moulin

Marc Moulin (16 August 1942 – 26 September 2008) was a Belgian musician and journalist (print, radio, TV). In the early-mid seventies, he was the leader of the jazz-rock group Placebo (not to be confused with the English rock band with the same name). He went on to become a member of the avant-rock band Aksak Maboul in 1977 and also formed the pop group Telex in 1978. Moulin was one of Belgium's jazz legends, making jazz-influenced records for over 30 years.

== Biography ==
Marc Moulin was born in Ixelles, Brussels, in 1942 and was the son of Léo Moulin, a sociologist and writer, and Jeanine Moulin, a Belgian poet and literary critic. Moulin began his career in the 1960s playing the piano throughout Europe and in 1961 won the Bobby Jaspar trophy for Best Soloist at the Comblain-la-Tour festival. Moulin made his first recording, the Jazz Goes Swinging LP, with The Saint-Tropez Jazz Octet (also known as Johnny Dover Octet) in 1969. Two years later, he formed the band Placebo with his close friend, guitar player Philip Catherine. Placebo recorded three albums (Ball of Eyes, 1973 and Placebo) and one 45 rpm single from 1973 until the group split up in 1976.

After Placebo disbanded, Moulin formed Telex, which represented Belgium in the Eurovision Song Contest 1980 placing 17th of 19, with Michel Moers (vocals) and Dan Lacksman (synthesizer) in 1978 and his style shifted to electro pop. He also began working as producer for artists such as Lio, Michel Moers, Sparks, Philip Catherine, French crooner Alain Chamfort and left-field artists such as Anna Domino and Kid Montana. During the '80s, Moulin worked as a radio producer, appeared regularly on radio shows, and wrote for various Belgian publications, including Télémoustique.

Moulin died of throat cancer on 26 September 2008. He was 66 years old.

== Discography ==
=== with Placebo ===
- 1971 Ball of Eyes
- 1973 1973
- 1974 Placebo
- 1999 Placebo Sessions 1971–1974 (compilation)
- 2006 Placebo Years 1971–1974 (compilation)

=== Solo ===
- 1975 Sam' Suffy
- 1986 Picnic
- 1992 Mæssage
- 2001 Top Secret
- 2004 Entertainment
- 2007 I Am You

Posthumous collections

- 2009 Bestof
- 2009 Bestof Restof
- 2009 Boxof
- 2013 Songs & Moods

Posthumous re-releases

- 2018 Placebo
- 2018 Placebo 1973
- 2018 Ball of Eyes
- 2018 Placebo Years Lost & Found
