= Tullio Abbate =

Italian entrepreneur (1944–2020)

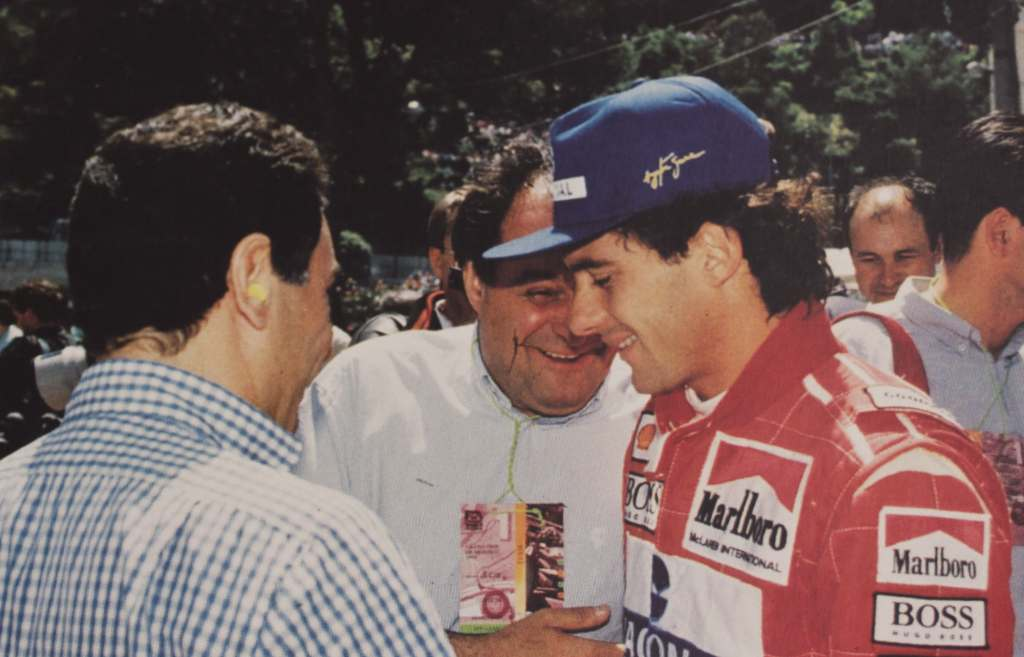
- Born: 15 July 1944
- Died: 9 April 2020 (aged 75)
- Occupations: Businessman and motorboat racer.
- Children: 3

Tullio Abbate (Tremezzina, 15 July 1944 – Milan, 9 April 2020) was an Italian businessman and motorboat racer, founder of the company of the same name.

== Biography ==
Tullio Abbate was the eldest of three children of boat builder Guido Abbate and his wife Paola. He was successful as an offshore powerboat racing pilot already at the age of sixteen; he won the European Powerboat Championship in Cannes in 1960 as a co-pilot. Three years later, he won with a racing boat designed and built by himself in the Offshore "Regatta Centomiglia del Lario" of the Champions de Europa.

In 1975 he took over his father's shipyard in Tremezzo, further expanded the company and introduced the use of modern fiberglass. His number 5 of the Centomiglia del Lario regatta became part of the company logo. The company, which operated as Tullio Abbate Group Srl, was based in Mezzegra on Lake Como. It produced 250 to 300 fast boats per year since the mid 1980s. The first successful model was the "Sea Star", of which several thousand were built. Other series models followed, the largest of which was 80 feet long.

Abbate was on the winning lists with over 250 racing wins since 1960; he also set several records. His last in 1997, when he surpassed 223 km/h.

Niki Lauda, Keke Rosberg and Riccardo Patrese took boat trips with Tullio Abbate; Ayrton Senna gave his name to an Abbate boat project. This 12.90 meter long racing boat was built under the name of Senna 42 Evolution. Tullio Abbate's most innovative projects were the Superiority 60 and exception 70, designed by industrial designer Giorgetto Giugiaro (Italdesign Giugiaro).

He died at age 75 at the San Raffaele Hospital in Milan, after being infected by COVID-19 during the pandemic in Italy.
