= Valsolda =

- Comune
- Comune di Valsolda
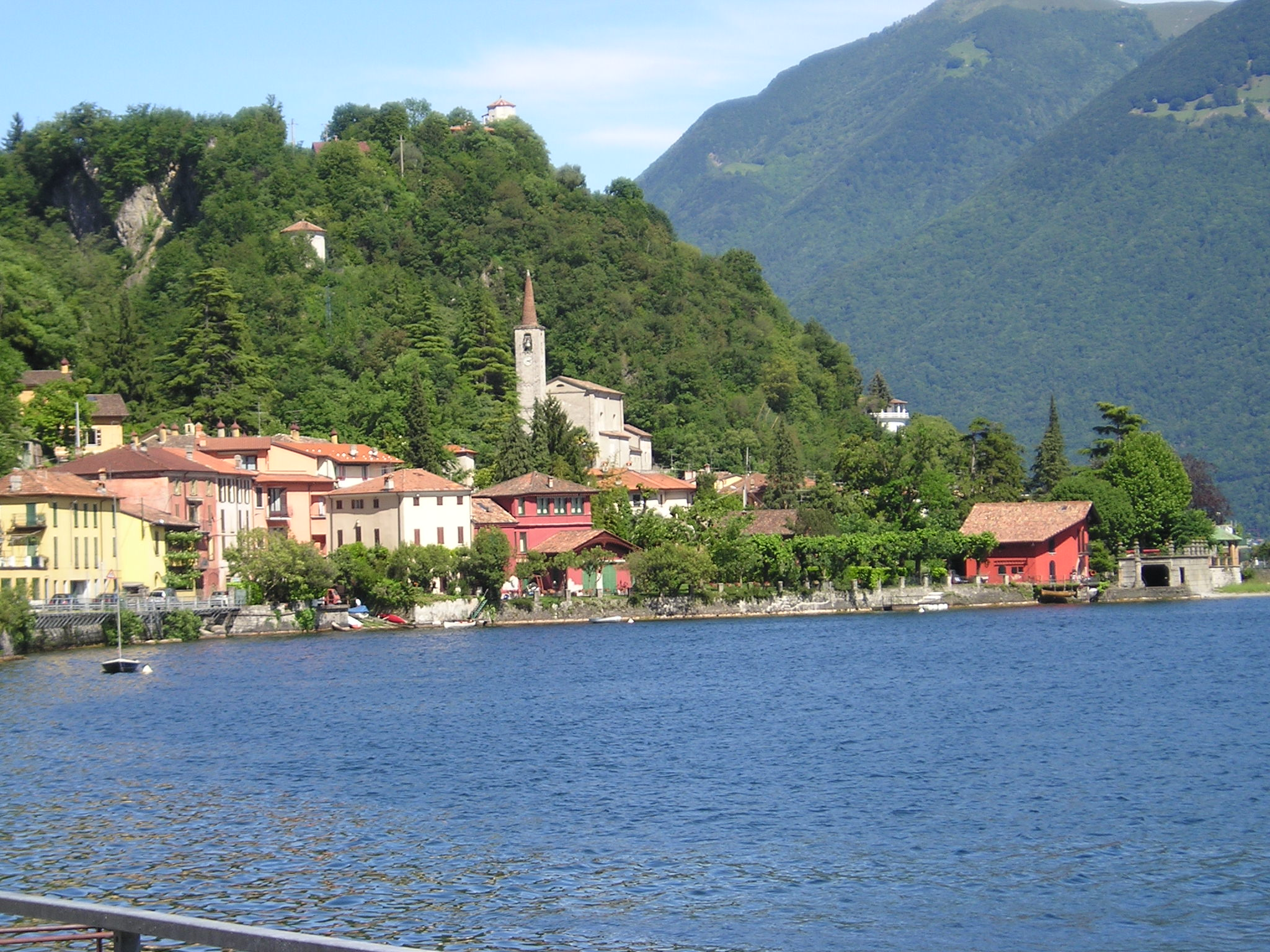

- Coat of arms

- Location within Italy Location within Lombardy
- Coordinates: 46°2′N 9°3′E
- Country: Italy
- Region: Lombardy
- Province: Como (CO)
- Frazioni: Albogasio Inferiore, Albogasio Superiore, Castello, Cressogno, Dasio, Drano, Loggio, Oria, Puria, San Mamete (municipal seat), Santa Margherita

Government
  - Mayor: Laura Romanò

Area
  - Total: 31.7 km^{2} (12.2 sq mi)
- Elevation: 275 m (902 ft)

Population (31 March 2017)
  - Total: 1,551
  - Density: 48.9/km^{2} (127/sq mi)
- Demonym: Valsoldesi
- Time zone: UTC+1 (CET)
  - Summer (DST): UTC+2 (CEST)
- Postal code: 22010
- Dialing code: 0344
- Website: Official website

Valsoldaː Lake Lugano and porticoes at San Mamete

Valsolda is a comune (municipality) of about 1,400 inhabitants in the Province of Como in the Italian region Lombardy on the border with Switzerland. It is located about 60 kilometres (37 mi) north of Milan, about 25 kilometres (16 mi) north of Como and 2 kilometres (1.2 mi) east of Lugano.

Valsolda (Vallis Solida in Latin) gives the name to the river Soldo who cuts across the valley. The municipality was formed in 1927 and it is subdivided into nine villages: Cressogno, San Mamete (the municipal seat), Albogasio, Oria and Santa Margherita on the shores of Lake Lugano, as well as Loggio, Drano, Puria, Dasio and Castello on the mountains above.

Valsolda is home to the largest natural reserve in Lombardy with over 785 acres of forest populated by deer, roes, chamois, yews, foxes, eagles, hawks and sparrows.

Valsolda was the set of some the works of novelist Antonio Fogazzaro, including Malombra (1881) and Piccolo mondo antico (1895); his house in Oria is still visitable. Other notable figures from the area include painter Paolo Pagani, architect Pellegrino Tibaldi, writer and journalist Brunella Gasperini, writer and translator Fabio Pusterla, TV anchors Victoria Cabello and Kurt Felix, singer Paola Del Medico and the family of World champion figureskater Gundi Busch.

Among the sights in the town is the church of Sant'Ambrogio and San Bartolomeo Church.

Valsolda borders the following municipalities: Cadro (Switzerland), Cimadera (Switzerland), Claino con Osteno (Italy), Alta Valle Intelvi (Italy), Lugano (Switzerland), Porlezza (Italy), Sonvico (Switzerland), Val Rezzo (Italy) and Villa Luganese (Switzerland).

Valsolda is twinned with the town of Węgrów in Poland.
