= Kurt Felix =

Kurt Felix may refer to:

- Kurt Felix (television presenter) (1941–2012), Swiss television presenter and entertainer
- Kurt Felix (decathlete) (born 1988), Grenadian decathlete
