= Corrido (disambiguation) =

Corrido is a folk poetic narrative and music genre of Mexico.

Corrido may also refer to:

- Corrido, Lombardy, municipality in the Province of Como in the Italian region Lombardy
- Corrido (capoeira), a song form of capoeira music
