= Giovanni Antonio Pellegrini =

Italian painter (1675–1741)

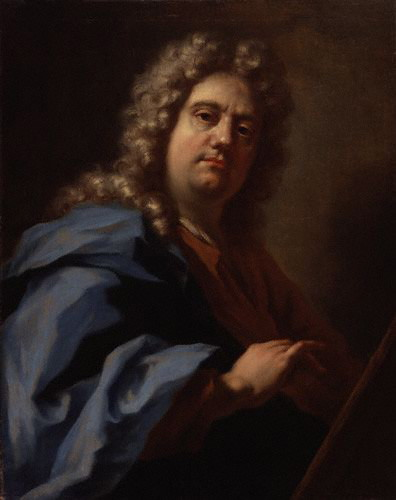
Selfportrait, c. 1717

Giovanni Antonio Pellegrini (29 April 1675 – 2 or 5 November 1741) was one of the leading Venetian history painters of the early 18th century. His style melded the Renaissance style of Paolo Veronese with the Baroque of Pietro da Cortona and Luca Giordano. He travelled widely on commissions which brought him to England, the Southern Netherlands, the Dutch Republic, Germany, Austria and France. He is considered an important predecessor of Giovanni Battista Tiepolo. One of his pupils was Antonio Visentini.

== Life ==
Pellegrini was born in Venice. His father, also called Antonio, was a shoemaker from Padua. Pellegrini was a pupil of the Milanese painter Paolo Pagani. He travelled with his master to Moravia and Vienna in 1690 and was back in Venice in 1696 where he painted his first surviving works. The work of fellow Venetian Sebastiano Ricci had an important influence on his work. He was in Rome from 1699 to 1701. He married Angela Carriera, the sister of Rosalba Carriera, in c.1704. Pellegrini decorated the dome above the staircase at the Scuola Grande di San Rocco in 1709.

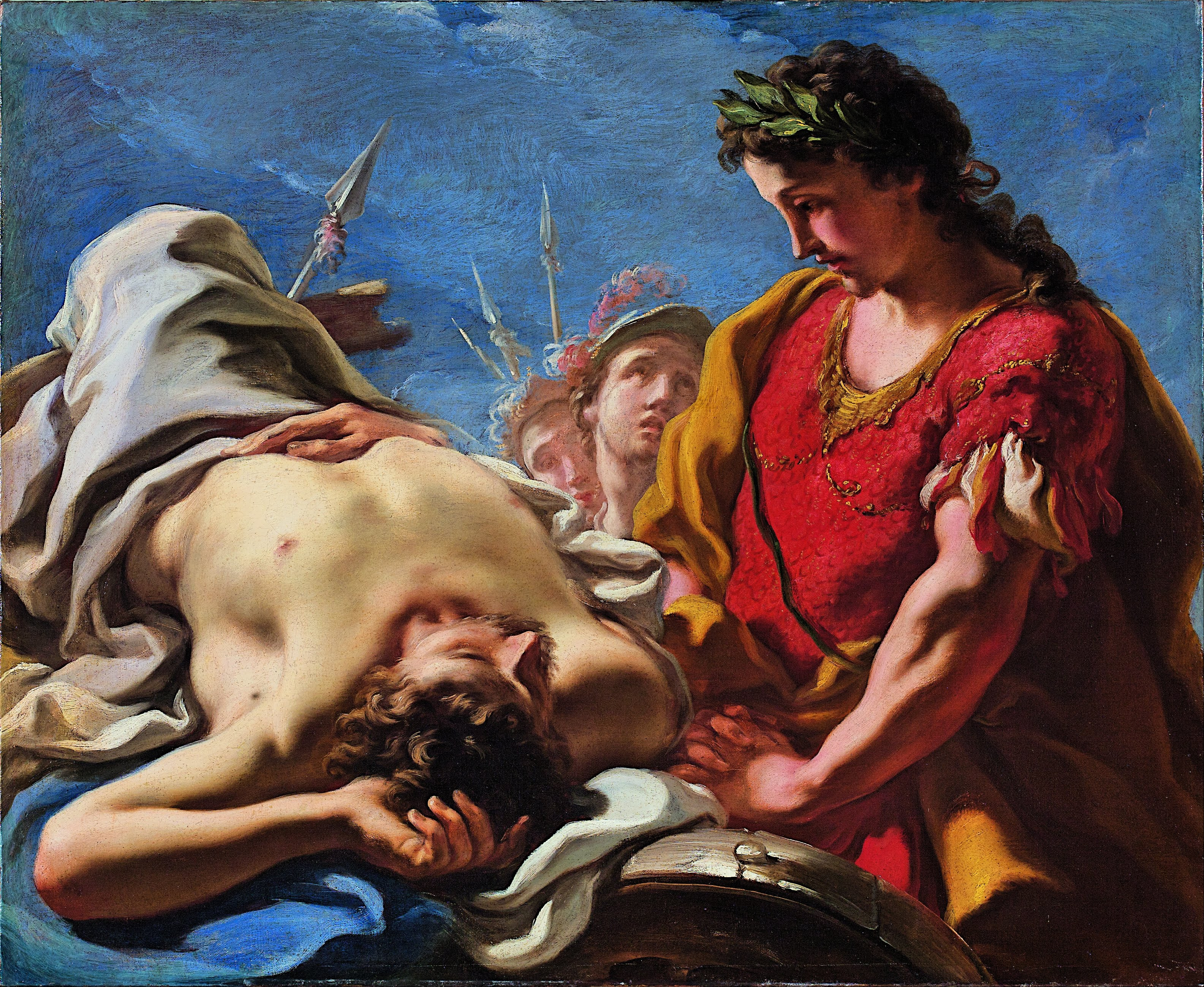
Alexander at the corpse of the dead Darius

Pellegrini visited England from 1708 to 1713 at the invitation of the Earl of Manchester. Here he achieved considerable success. He painted murals in a number of English country houses, including at Kimbolton Castle for the Earl of Manchester, Castle Howard (where his work was mostly destroyed by a fire in 1940), and Narford Hall, Norfolk, for Sir Andrew Fontaine. Michael Levey, describing Pellegrini's paintings on the staircase at Kimbolton, says that, although painted directly into the wall in oil, "they have all the spontaneity and lightness of fresco. In London he worked at 31 St James's Square for the Duke of Portland, where George Vertue noted in his notebooks "the hall and Staircase and one or two of the great rooms".

He became a director of Sir Godfrey Kneller's Academy in London in 1711. He submitted designs for decorating the interior dome of the new St Paul's Cathedral, and is said to have been Christopher Wren's favourite painter. He did not win the commission, losing out to Sir James Thornhill.

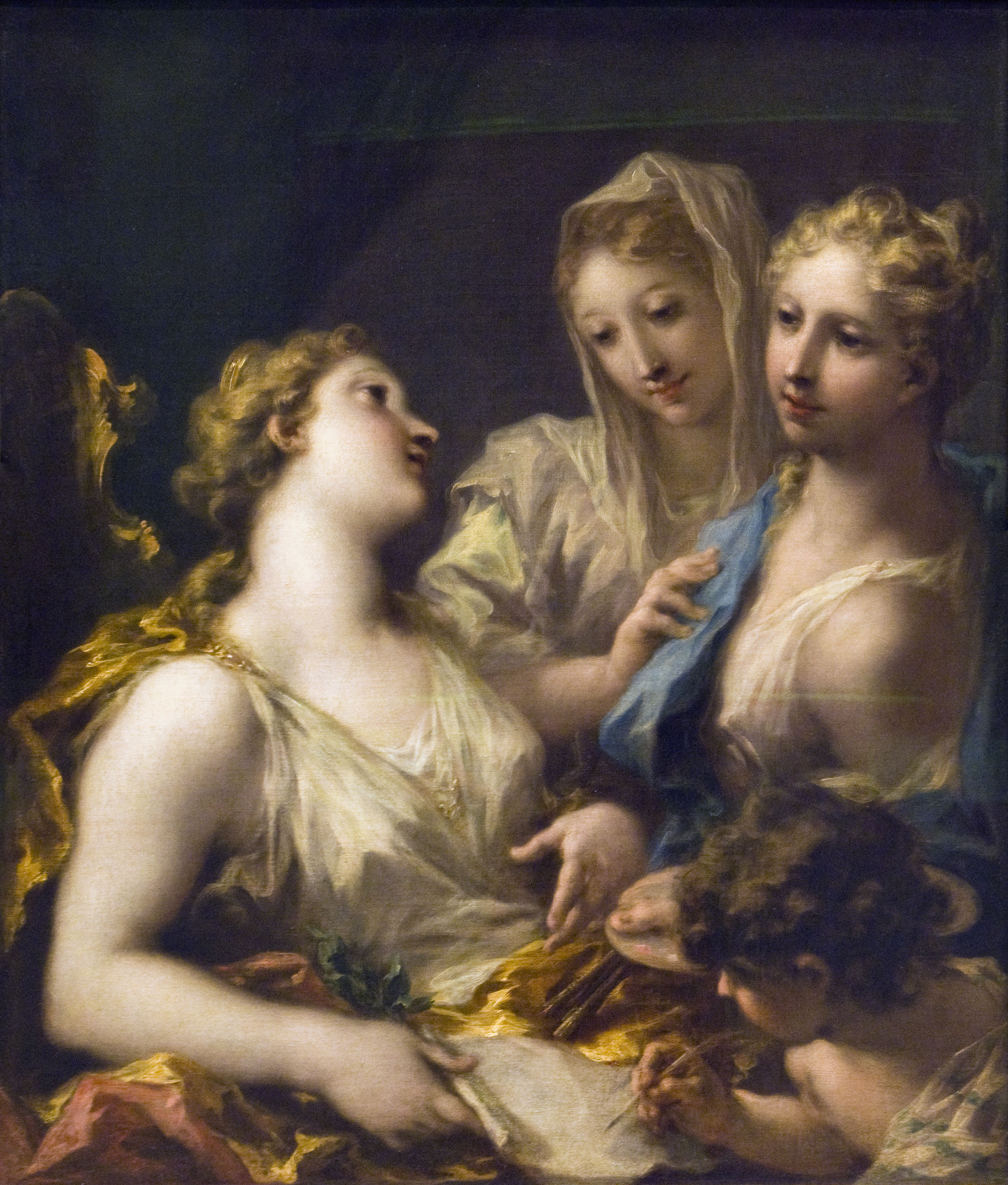
Modesty Presenting Painting to the Academy

Pellegrini subsequently travelled through Germany and the Netherlands, collecting Northern paintings as he went and completing works in many European cities. In 1713-4 he was in Düsseldorf, where he painted a series of allegorical scenes of the life of the elector, Johann Wilhelm. He decorated the Golden Room in the Mauritshuis in The Hague, and carried out other decorative schemes in Prague, Dresden and Vienna. He returned to England in 1719, but was less successful on his second visit, mainly due to competition from other Venetian painters, including Sebastiano Ricci.

In about 1720 he painted the ceiling of John Law's Bank in Paris (since destroyed).

== Sources ==
- Levey, Michael (1980). Painting in Eighteenth Century Venice (second ed.). Oxford: Phaidon.
