= Grand Hotel Tremezzo =

Hôtel on Lake Como, Italy

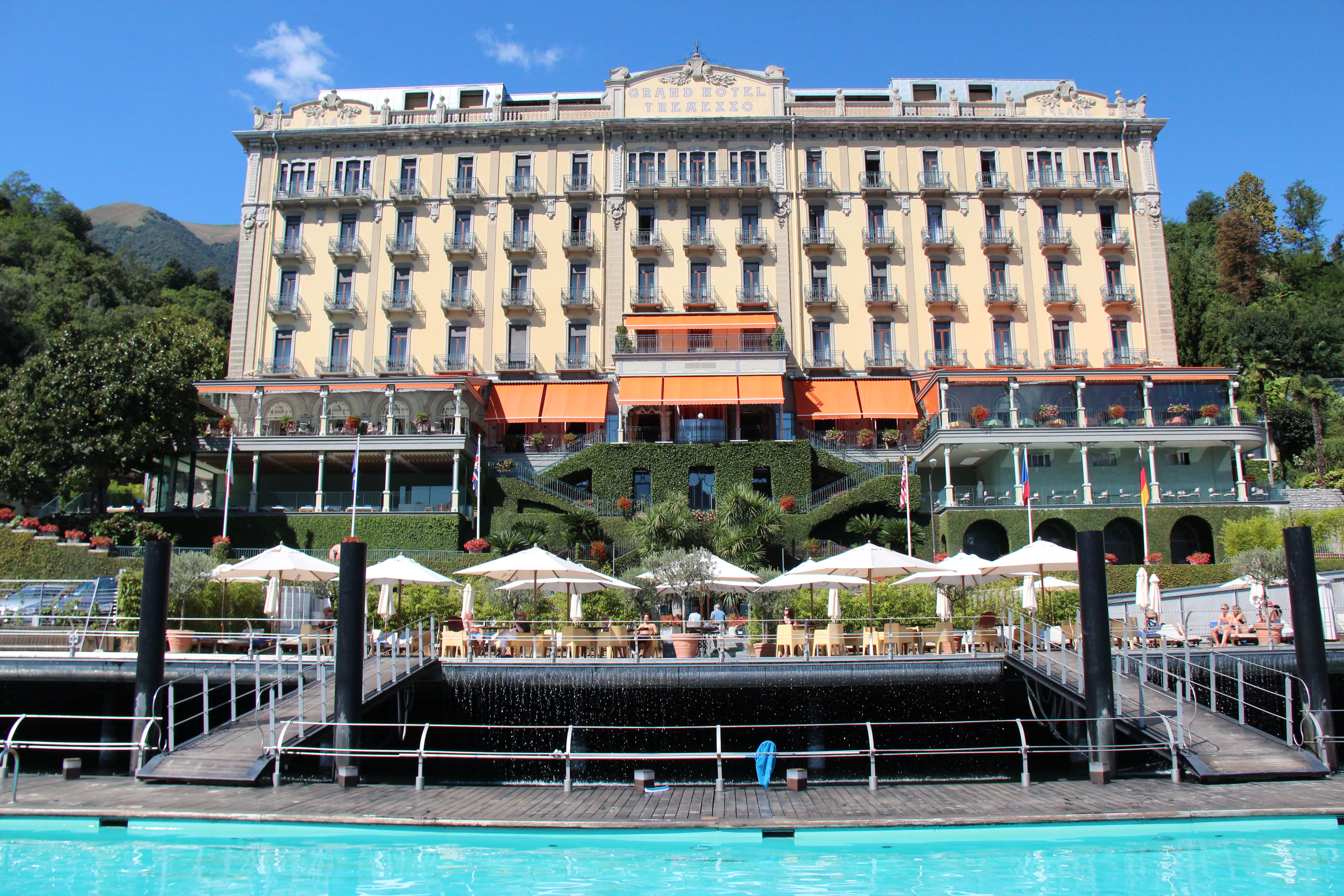
- Grand Hotel Tremezzo on Lake Como, Italy
- Interactive map of the Grand Hotel Tremezzo area

General information
- Location: Tremezzina, Italy
- Coordinates: 45°59′05.6″N 9°13′42.35″E
- Opened: 1910; 116 years ago

Website
- www.grandhoteltremezzo.com/it/home/

Grand Hotel Tremezzo is a historic luxury hotel located on the shores of Lake Como in Italy.

== History ==
The hotel was built on behalf of Enea Gandola on the grounds that previously belonged to Villa Poncetta. Gandola, who was from nearby Bellagio, had bought the land in 1907 with the purpose to build a new luxury hotel to meet Tremezzo's increasing tourism development. Construction works started in 1908 and were completed in 1910.

== Description ==
The building, located in the village of Tremezzo, features an Art Nouveau style.

== Gallery ==
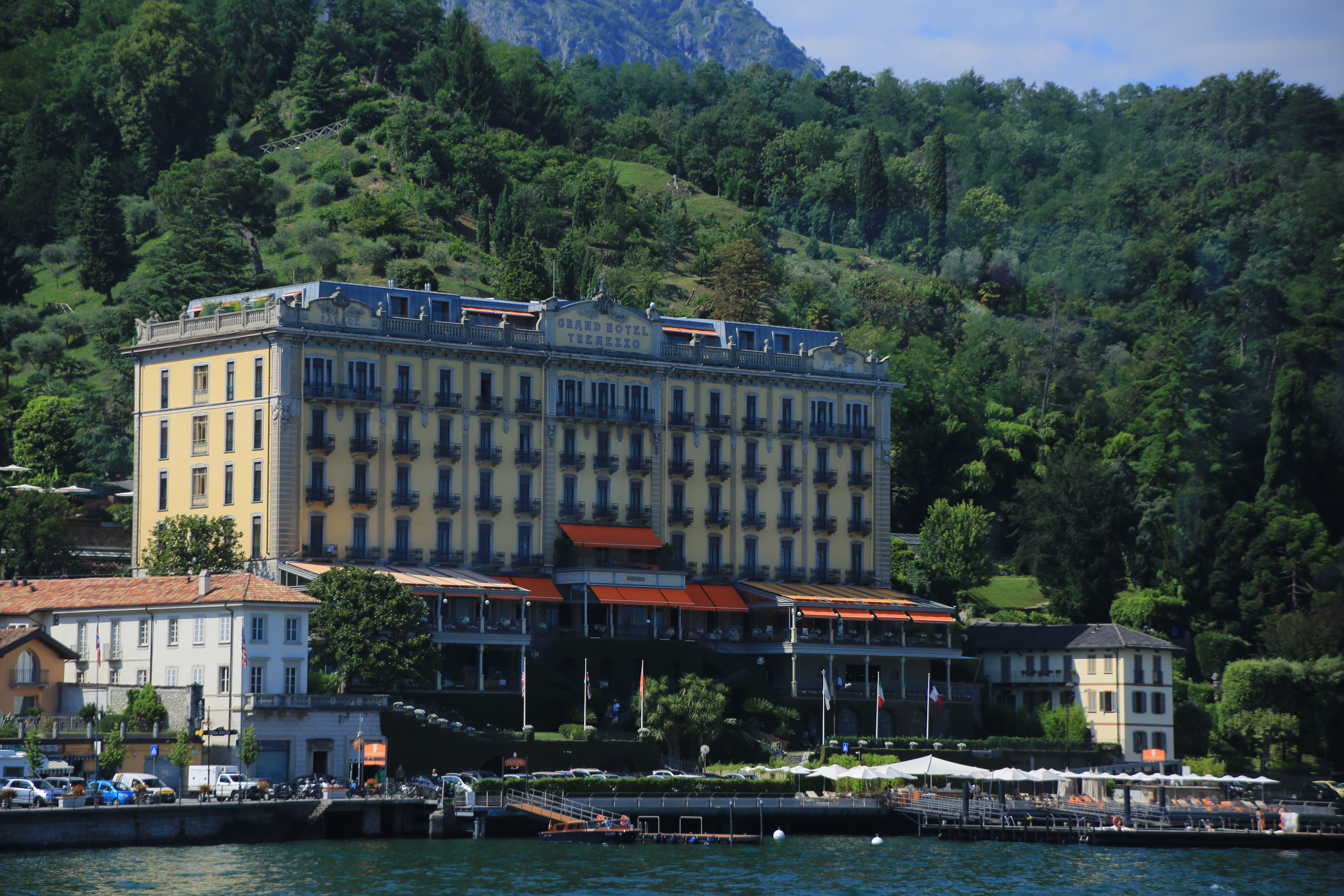

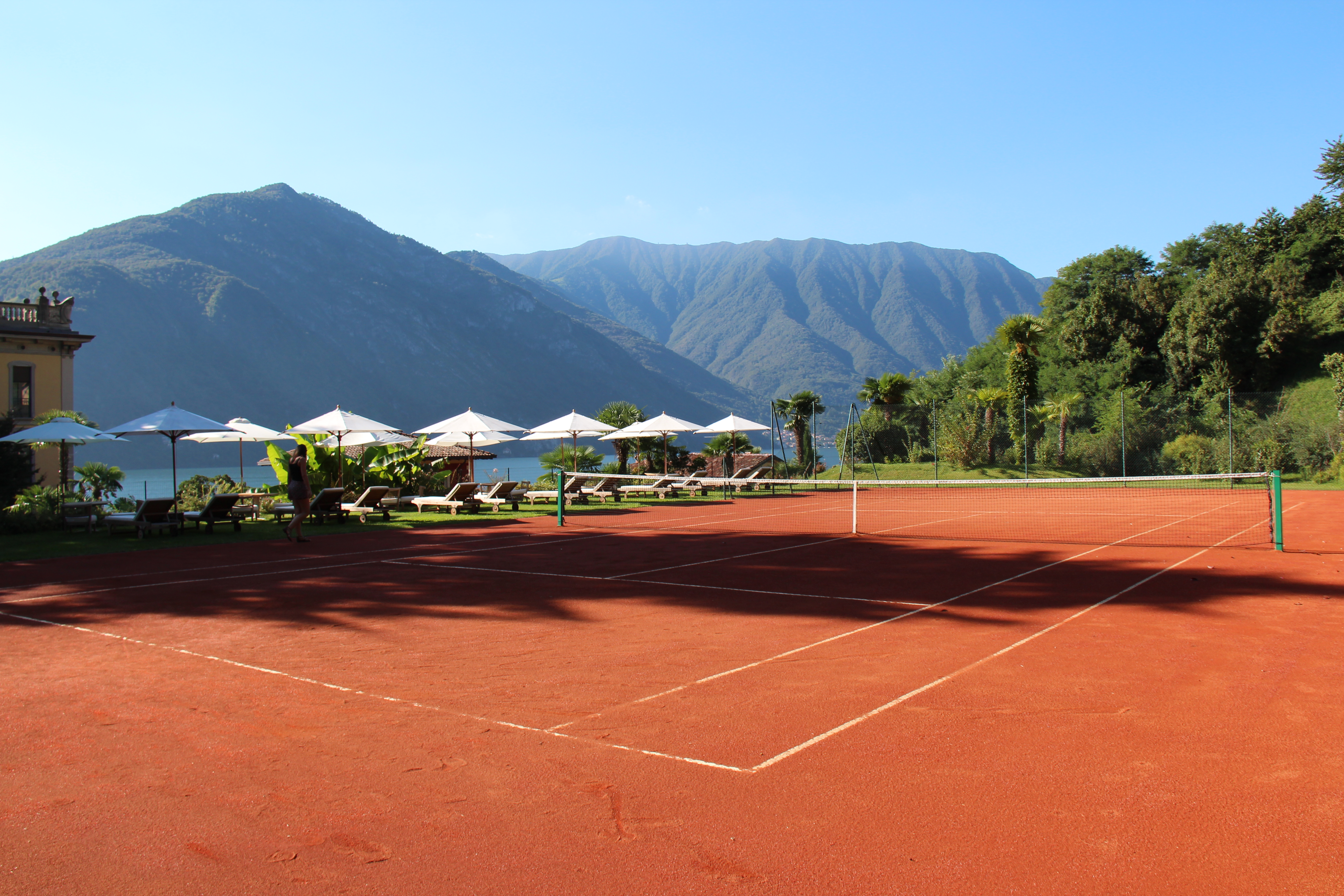

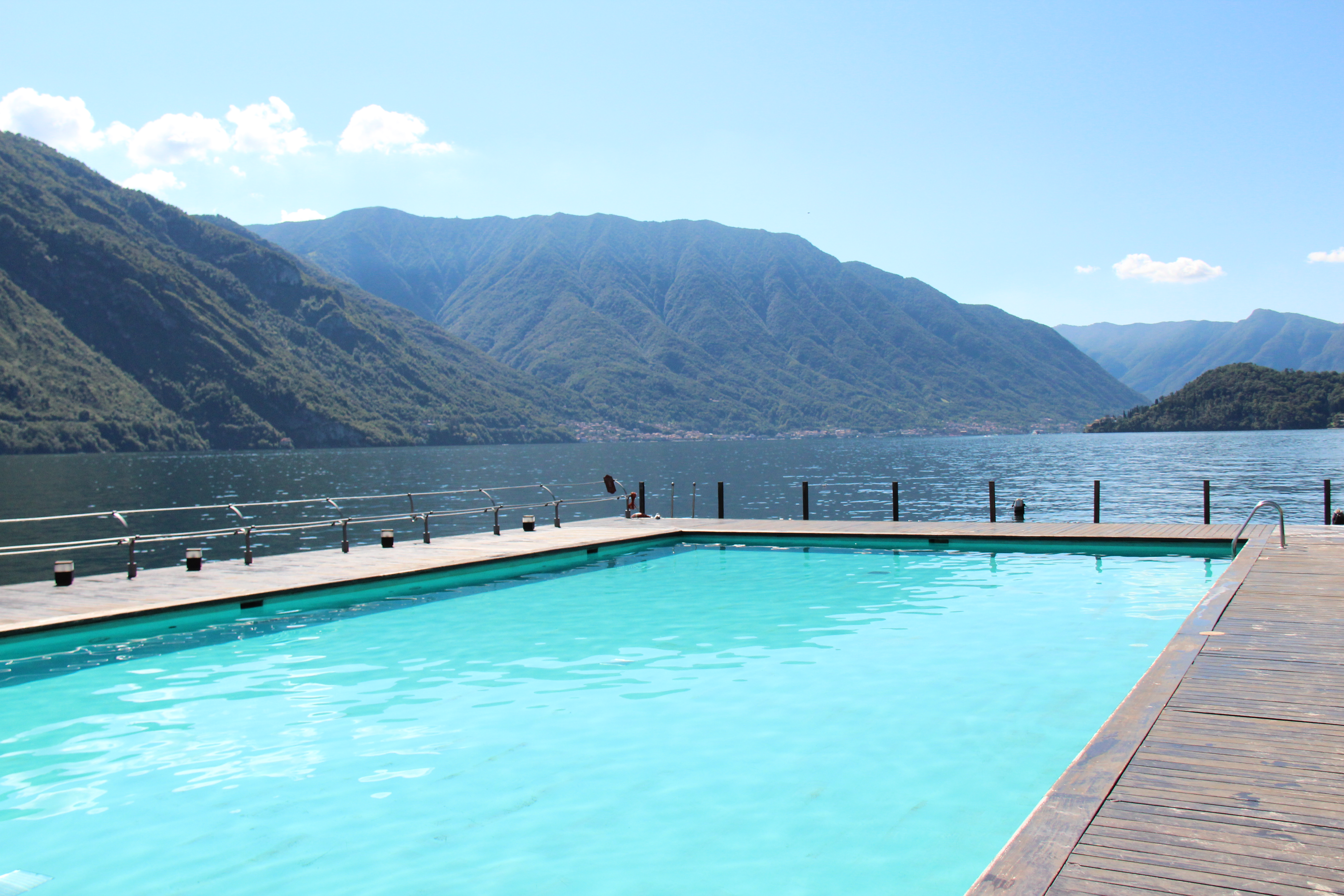
