= Garzeno =

Garzeno Garzee (Lombard)
- Comune
- Comune di Garzeno
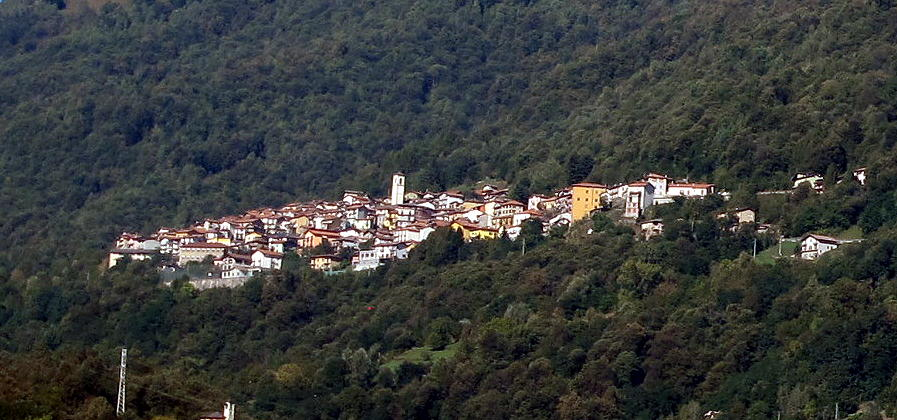

- Location within Italy Location within Lombardy
- Coordinates: 46°8′N 9°15′E
- Country: Italy
- Region: Lombardy
- Province: Como (CO)

Government
  - Mayor: Marco Braga

Area
  - Total: 28.76 km^{2} (11.10 sq mi)

Population (31 March 2017)
  - Total: 765
  - Density: 26.6/km^{2} (68.9/sq mi)
- Time zone: UTC+1 (CET)
  - Summer (DST): UTC+2 (CEST)
- Postal code: 22010
- Dialing code: 0344
- Website: Official website

Garzeno (Comasco: Garzee [ɡarˈdzeː]) is a comune (municipality) in the Province of Como in the Italian region Lombardy, located about 70 kilometres (43 mi) north of Milan and about 35 kilometres (22 mi) northeast of Como.

Garzeno borders the following municipalities: Cremia, Cusino, Dongo, Grandola ed Uniti, Orta Nova, Pianello del Lario, Plesio, San Bartolomeo Val Cavargna, San Nazzaro Val Cavargna,
