= San Bartolomeo, Valsolda =

Church in Loggio, Italy

Coordinates: 46°1′41.1″N 9°3′33.8″E

San Bartolomeo is a Baroque-style, Roman Catholic church located in Loggio, a village within the municipality of Valsolda, Province of Como, region of Lombardy, Italy.

This church was built in 1262, and is located between Loggio and Drano. Accessible by a set of stairs, the church was last refurbished in 1736, when the belltower was re-built and granted a golden globe.

On the counterfacade is a large fresco depicting the Triumph of the Eucharist, a favorite theme of the Counter-reform, by Giovanni Battista Pozzi, based on a tapestry by Rubens located in Turin.
