= Val Rezzo =

Val Rezzo Val Rezz (Lombard)
- Comune
- Comune di Val Rezzo

- Location within Italy Location within Lombardy
- Coordinates: 46°4′N 9°7′E
- Country: Italy
- Region: Lombardy
- Province: Province of Como (CO)

Area
  - Total: 6.6 km^{2} (2.5 sq mi)

Population (Dec. 2004)
  - Total: 202
  - Density: 31/km^{2} (79/sq mi)
- Time zone: UTC+1 (CET)
  - Summer (DST): UTC+2 (CEST)
- Postal code: 22010
- Dialing code: 0344

Val Rezzo (Comasco: Val Rezz [ˌʋal ˈrɛts]) is a comune (municipality) in the Province of Como in the Italian region Lombardy, located about 70 kilometres (43 mi) north of Milan and about 30 kilometres (19 mi) north of Como, on the border with Switzerland. As of 31 December 2004, it had a population of 202 and an area of 6.6 square kilometres (2.5 mi^{2}).

Val Rezzo borders the following municipalities: Bogno (Switzerland), Carlazzo, Cavargna, Certara (Switzerland), Cimadera (Switzerland), Corrido, Porlezza, San Nazzaro Val Cavargna, Valsolda.

== Demographic evolution ==
Historical population

Year	Pop.	±%
1861	252	—
1871	265	+5.2%
1881	273	+3.0%
1901	341	+24.9%
1911	327	−4.1%

Year	Pop.	±%
1921	350	+7.0%
1931	348	−0.6%
1936	313	−10.1%
1951	302	−3.5%
1961	318	+5.3%

Year	Pop.	±%
1971	295	−7.2%
1981	256	−13.2%
1991	259	+1.2%
2001	217	−16.2%

Source: Data from ISTAT
