= Sant'Ambrogio, Valsolda =

Church building in Albogasio, Valsolda, Italy

Sant'Ambrogio is a Roman Catholic church located in Albogasio Superiore, a village within the municipality of Valsolda, on the Lake of Lugano in Italy.

The church was built in the 15th century, and was refurbished in c. 1500. The interior was frescoed in 1680 with the Life of Saint Ambrose by Stefano Vignola.
