= San Bartolomeo Val Cavargna =

- Comune
- Comune di San Bartolomeo Val Cavargna
- Location within Italy Location within Lombardy
- Coordinates: 46°5′N 9°9′E
- Country: Italy
- Region: Lombardy
- Province: Province of Como (CO)

Area
  - Total: 11.1 km^{2} (4.3 sq mi)

Population (Dec. 2004)
  - Total: 1,102
  - Density: 99.3/km^{2} (257/sq mi)
- Time zone: UTC+1 (CET)
  - Summer (DST): UTC+2 (CEST)
- Postal code: 22010
- Dialing code: 0344

San Bartolomeo Val Cavargna (Comasco: San Bortòl [ˌsãːˈbortul] or [ˌsãːˈbɔrtul]) is a comune (municipality) in the Province of Como in the Italian region Lombardy, located about 70 kilometres (43 mi) north of Milan and about 30 kilometres (19 mi) north of Como. As of 31 December 2004, it had a population of 1,102 and an area of 11.1 square kilometres (4.3 mi^{2}).

San Bartolomeo Val Cavargna borders the following municipalities: Carlazzo, Cusino, Garzeno, San Nazzaro Val Cavargna.

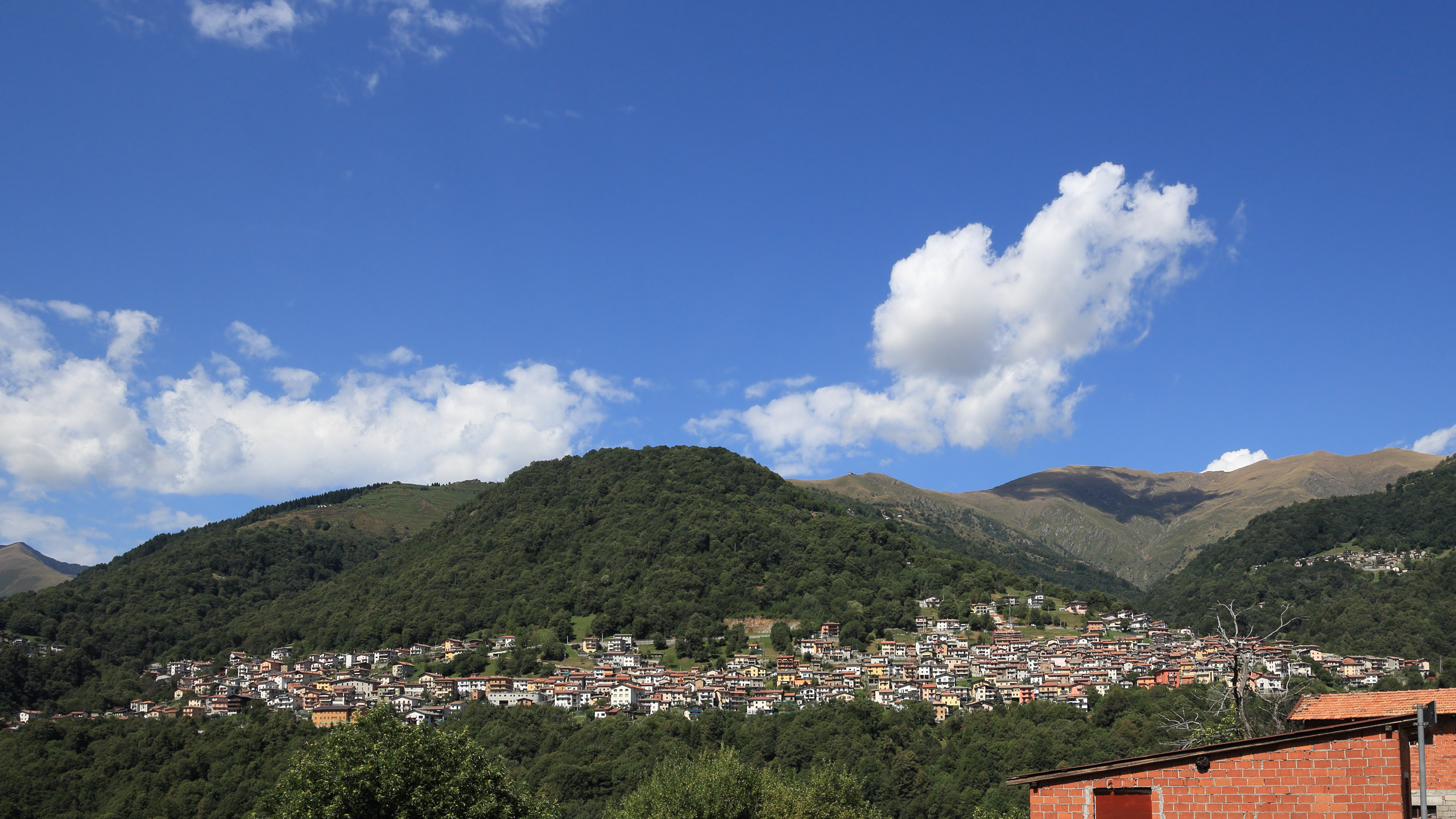

== Demographic evolution ==
Historical population

Year	Pop.	±%
1861	880	—
1871	862	−2.0%
1881	952	+10.4%
1901	1,053	+10.6%
1911	1,226	+16.4%

Year	Pop.	±%
1921	1,406	+14.7%
1931	1,400	−0.4%
1936	1,251	−10.6%
1951	1,273	+1.8%
1961	1,315	+3.3%

Year	Pop.	±%
1971	1,234	−6.2%
1981	1,235	+0.1%
1991	1,210	−2.0%
2001	1,118	−7.6%

Source: Data from ISTAT
