= Grandola ed Uniti =

- Comune
- Comune di Grandola ed Uniti
- Location within Italy Location within Lombardy
- Coordinates: 46°2′N 9°13′E
- Country: Italy
- Region: Lombardy
- Province: Province of Como (CO)

Area
  - Total: 17.3 km^{2} (6.7 sq mi)

Population (Dec. 2004)
  - Total: 1,281
  - Density: 74.0/km^{2} (192/sq mi)
- Time zone: UTC+1 (CET)
  - Summer (DST): UTC+2 (CEST)
- Postal code: 22010
- Dialing code: 0344

Grandola ed Uniti is a comune (municipality) in the Province of Como in the Italian region Lombardy, located about 60 kilometres (37 mi) north of Milan and about 25 kilometres (16 mi) northeast of Como. As of 31 December 2004, it had a population of 1,281 and an area of 17.3 km^{2} (6.7 sq mi).

Grandola ed Uniti borders the following municipalities: Bene Lario, Carlazzo, Cusino, Garzeno, Lenno, Menaggio, Mezzegra, Plesio, Tremezzo.

== Demographic evolution ==
Historical population

Year	Pop.	±%
1861	1,613	—
1871	1,590	−1.4%
1881	1,527	−4.0%
1901	1,450	−5.0%
1911	1,532	+5.7%

Year	Pop.	±%
1921	1,538	+0.4%
1931	1,447	−5.9%
1936	1,216	−16.0%
1951	1,203	−1.1%
1961	1,090	−9.4%

Year	Pop.	±%
1971	1,113	+2.1%
1981	1,143	+2.7%
1991	1,179	+3.1%
2001	1,267	+7.5%

Source: Data from ISTAT
