= Lenno =

- Comune
- Comune di Lenno
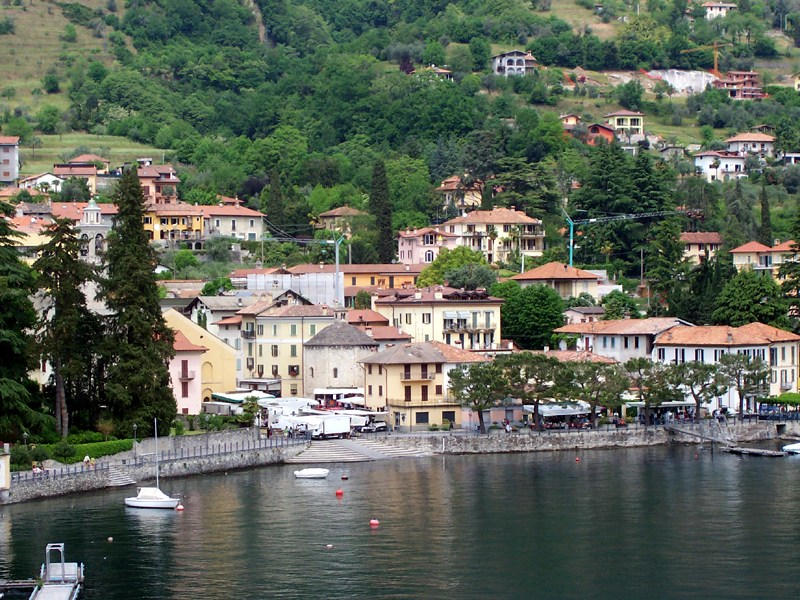
- Lenno

- Location within Italy Location within Lombardy
- Coordinates: 45°58′N 9°12′E
- Country: Italy
- Region: Lombardy
- Province: Province of Como (CO)

Area
  - Total: 9.6 km^{2} (3.7 sq mi)

Population (Dec. 2004)
  - Total: 1,800
  - Density: 190/km^{2} (490/sq mi)
- Time zone: UTC+1 (CET)
  - Summer (DST): UTC+2 (CEST)
- Postal code: 22016
- Dialing code: 0344
- Website: Official website

Lenno (Lombard: Lenn) was a comune (municipality) in the Province of Como in the Italian region Lombardy, located about 60 kilometres (37 mi) north of Milan and about 20 kilometres (12 mi) northeast of Como. As of 31 December 2004, it had a population of 1,800 and an area of 9.6 km^{2} (3.7 sq mi).

Lenno bordered the following municipalities: Bellagio, Bene Lario, Grandola ed Uniti, Lezzeno, Mezzegra, Ossuccio, Porlezza, Tremezzo. The Comune di Lenno was united to Mezzegra, Ossuccio and Tremezzo to form a single municipality named Comune di Tremezzina: the new administration was formalized after election of the Mayor on 25 May 2014.

== Demographic evolution ==
Historical population

Year	Pop.	±%
1861	1,294	—
1871	1,102	−14.8%
1881	1,403	+27.3%
1901	1,461	+4.1%
1911	1,723	+17.9%

Year	Pop.	±%
1921	1,407	−18.3%
1931	1,601	+13.8%
1936	1,441	−10.0%
1951	1,425	−1.1%
1961	1,380	−3.2%

Year	Pop.	±%
1971	1,508	+9.3%
1981	1,622	+7.6%
1991	1,611	−0.7%
2001	1,786	+10.9%

Source: Data from ISTAT

== Twin towns ==
Lenno was twinned with:

- Lemnos, Greece
