= San Nazzaro Val Cavargna =

- Comune
- Comune di San Nazzaro Val Cavargna
- Location within Italy Location within Lombardy
- Coordinates: 46°5′N 9°8′E
- Country: Italy
- Region: Lombardy
- Province: Province of Como (CO)

Area
  - Total: 13.3 km^{2} (5.1 sq mi)

Population (Dec. 2004)
  - Total: 396
  - Density: 29.8/km^{2} (77.1/sq mi)
- Time zone: UTC+1 (CET)
  - Summer (DST): UTC+2 (CEST)
- Postal code: 22010
- Dialing code: 0344

San Nazzaro Val Cavargna (Western Lombard: San Nazzer [ˌsãː naˈdzeːr]) is a comune (municipality) in the Province of Como in the Italian region Lombardy, located about 70 kilometres (43 mi) north of Milan and about 30 kilometres (19 mi) north of Como, on the border with Switzerland. As of 31 December 2004, it had a population of 396 and an area of 13.3 square kilometres (5.1 mi^{2}).

San Nazzaro Val Cavargna borders the following municipalities: Carlazzo, Cavargna, Garzeno, Germasino, San Bartolomeo Val Cavargna, Sant'Antonio (Switzerland), Val Rezzo.

== Demographic evolution ==
Historical population

Year	Pop.	±%
1861	748	—
1871	780	+4.3%
1881	774	−0.8%
1901	706	−8.8%
1911	721	+2.1%

Year	Pop.	±%
1921	738	+2.4%
1931	706	−4.3%
1936	673	−4.7%
1951	632	−6.1%
1961	622	−1.6%

Year	Pop.	±%
1971	564	−9.3%
1981	543	−3.7%
1991	525	−3.3%
2001	419	−20.2%

Source: Data from ISTAT
