= Switzerland in the Eurovision Song Contest 1980 =

- Eurovision Song Contest 1980
- Participating broadcaster: Swiss Broadcasting Corporation (SRG SSR)
- Country: Switzerland
- Selection process: Internal selection
- Announcement date: 2 February 1980

Competing entry
- Song: "Cinéma"
- Artist: Paola
- Songwriters: Peter Reber; Véronique Müller

Placement
- Final result: 4th, 104 points

Participation chronology

Switzerland was represented at the Eurovision Song Contest 1980 with the song "Cinéma", written by Peter Reber and Véronique Müller and performed by Paola. The Swiss participating broadcaster, the Swiss Broadcasting Corporation (SRG SSR), selected its entry for the contest through an internal selection following the cancellation of a national final.

== Before Eurovision ==
=== Cancellation of national final and internal selection ===
The Swiss Broadcasting Corporation (SRG SSR) initially planned on holding a national final to select its entry for the Eurovision Song Contest 1980. Swiss German and Romansh broadcaster Schweizer Fernsehen der deutschen und rätoromanischen Schweiz (SF DRS) was to stage the national final on 12 March 1980 at 21:00 CET in the Schluefweg Center in Zürich. It would have used the same voting system as many previous Swiss finals; three 50-member regional public juries, a press jury, and a jury of music experts.

The broadcaster received 104 total song submissions, 57 of which were in French and 47 in German. Not a single song in Italian was submitted. A 14-member jury shortlisted 12 songs before attempting to select around ten to take part in the selection. Nine of the shortlisted songs were in German, while the other three were in French.

However, when the jury reviewed the shortlisted songs to decide the final lineup, only three songs fit the standard for the contest. Spokesperson of SRG SSR, Michel Stocker stated he disapproved of the concept of wildcard submissions to expand the lineup as he found them "meaningless." Due to the low amount of songs set to compete, the broadcaster decided to cancel the event to save on the budget of 350,000 CHF they would have otherwise spent and internally select their entrant instead. It was reported by a jury member that the other nine, anonymous songs strongly resembled works from ABBA or did not fit the standard commonly seen in Eurovision entries.

On 31 January in Bern, the same 14-member jury who shortlisted the valid songs internally selected "Cinéma", written by Peter Reber and Véronique Müller, composed by Reber, and performed by Paola, who had represented Switzerland in 1969. The three eligible songs the jury voted for are listed in the chart below, as well as any known information.

Internal selection — 31 January 1980
Artist(s)	Song	Songwriter(s)		Place
Artist(s)	Song	Composer	Lyricist(s)	Place
Paola	"Cinéma"	Peter Reber	Peter Reber; Véronique Müller	1
Paola	"El Dorado"	Unknown		3
Regard	"La maison vide"	Sylvie Grange	Gil Frattini	2

=== Releases ===
Paola first recorded and released "Cinéma" in a single in both German (A-side) and French (B-side). In 1998, the song was featured in a CD compilation titled "Concours Eurovision De La Chanson 1956-1998: Schweizer Beiträge", which compiled every Swiss Eurovision entry at the time. Neither of the other shortlisted songs were known to be released by their performers or covered commercially.

== At Eurovision ==
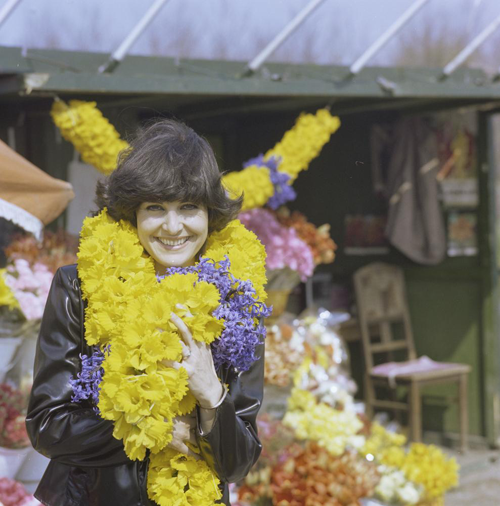
Paola (pictured in a photo used for the Swiss postcard) represented Switzerland in the Eurovision Song Contest 1980

At the Eurovision Song Contest 1980, held at the Nederlands Congresgebouw in the Hague, the Swiss entry was the ninth entry of the night following Sweden and preceding Finland. The Swiss conductor at the contest was Peter Reber, who composed the song and frequently participated in the contest as part of Peter, Sue and Marc. At the close of voting, Switzerland had received 104 points in total; finishing in fourth place out of nineteen countries.

The contest was broadcast on SRG SSR via TV DRS (with commentary from Theodor Haller) in German-speaking Switzerland, TSR (with commentary from Georges Hardy) in Romandy, and TSI (Note: Broadcast through a second audio programme on TSR) in Ticino.

=== Voting ===
Each participating broadcaster assembled a jury panel with at least eleven members. The jurors awarded 1-8, 10, and 12 points to their top ten songs. For the first time, the votes were given in ascending numerical order, rather than the order the awarded songs were performed in.

Points awarded to Switzerland
Score	Country
12 points	Finland; Ireland
10 points	Germany; Netherlands; Norway
8 points	Denmark
7 points	Morocco; United Kingdom
6 points	Austria; Portugal
5 points	Luxembourg
4 points	
3 points	Italy
2 points	Belgium; Spain; Sweden; Turkey
1 point	

Points awarded by Switzerland
Score	Country
12 points	Ireland
10 points	United Kingdom
8 points	Italy
7 points	Germany
6 points	Denmark
5 points	Sweden
4 points	Austria
3 points	Netherlands
2 points	Portugal
1 point	France
