= Carlazzo =

Carlazzo Carlasc (Lombard)
- Comune
- Comune di Carlazzo
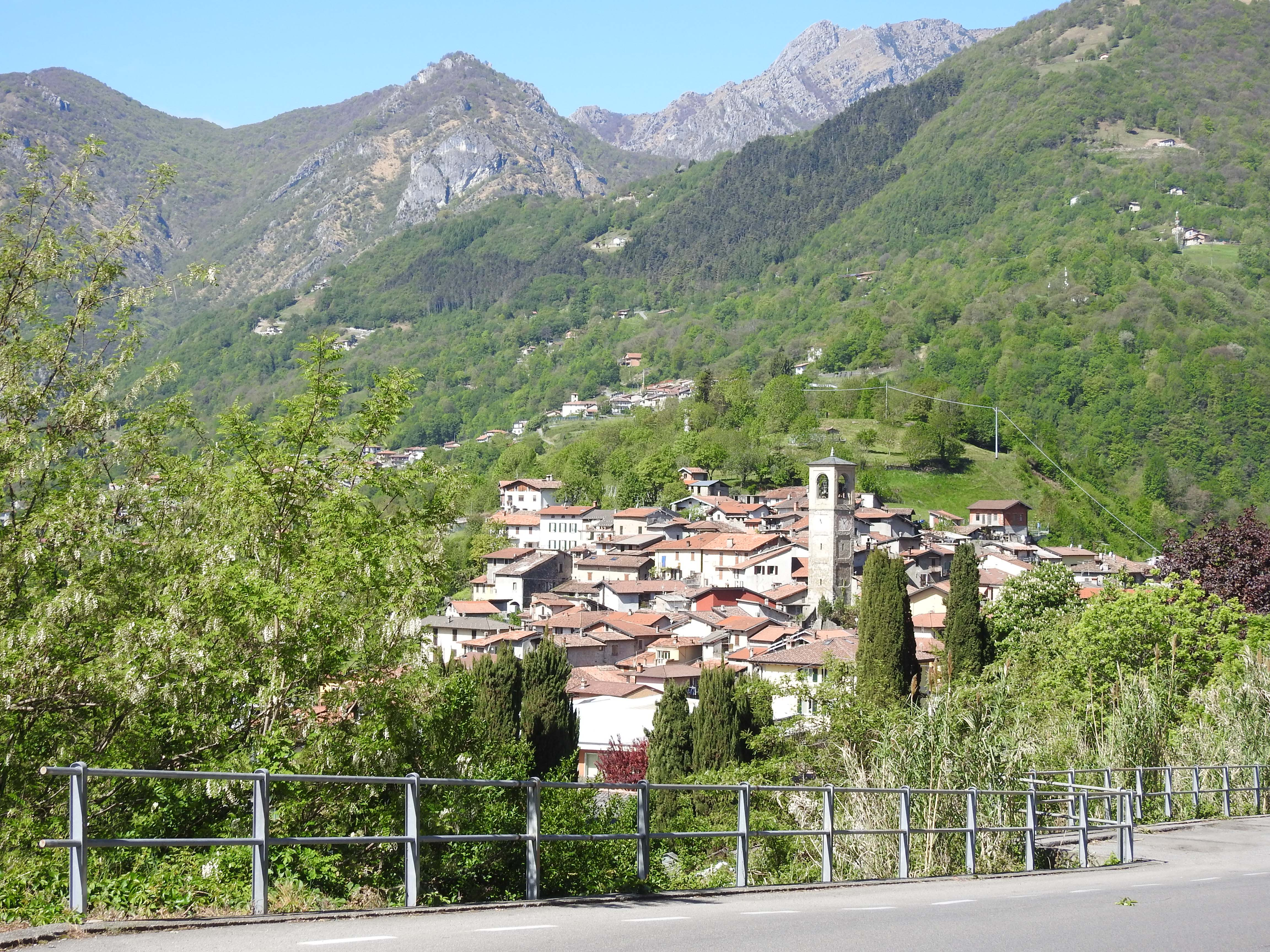

- Location within Italy Location within Lombardy
- Coordinates: 46°3′N 9°9′E
- Country: Italy
- Region: Lombardy
- Province: Province of Como (CO)

Area
  - Total: 12.7 km^{2} (4.9 sq mi)

Population (Dec. 2004)
  - Total: 2,838
  - Density: 223/km^{2} (579/sq mi)
- Time zone: UTC+1 (CET)
  - Summer (DST): UTC+2 (CEST)
- Postal code: 22010
- Dialing code: 0344

Carlazzo (Comasco: Carlasc [karˈlaʃ]) is a comune (municipality) in the Province of Como in the Italian region Lombardy, located about 60 kilometres (37 mi) north of Milan and about 25 kilometres (16 mi) north of Como. As of 31 December 2004, it had a population of 2,838 and an area of 12.7 square kilometres (4.9 mi^{2}).

Carlazzo borders the following municipalities: Bene Lario, Corrido, Cusino, Grandola ed Uniti, Porlezza, San Bartolomeo Val Cavargna, San Nazzaro Val Cavargna, Val Rezzo.

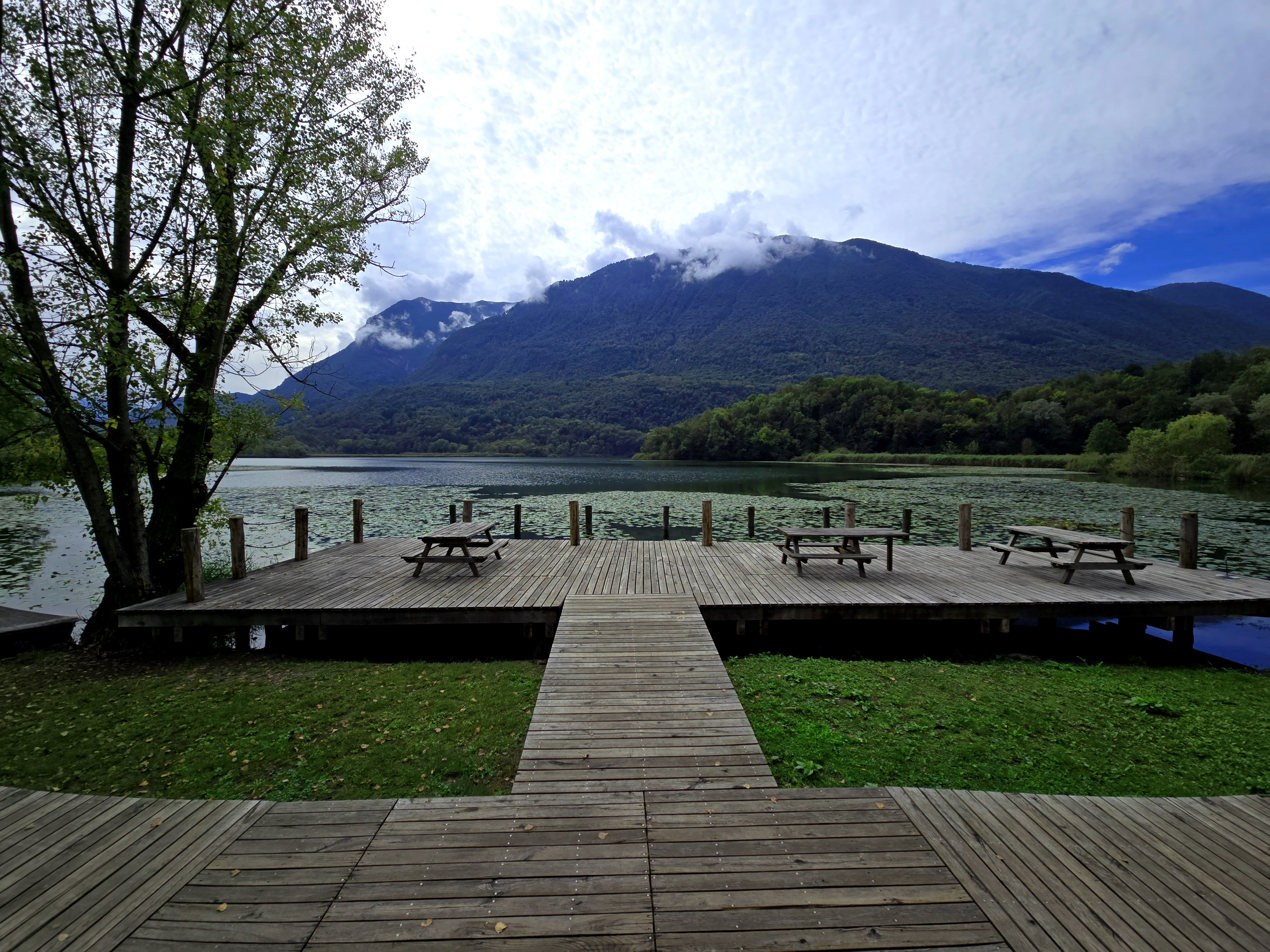
Carlazzo: Lago di Piano

== Demographic evolution ==
Historical population

Year	Pop.	±%
1861	2,110	—
1871	2,083	−1.3%
1881	2,018	−3.1%
1901	1,838	−8.9%
1911	1,798	−2.2%

Year	Pop.	±%
1921	1,799	+0.1%
1931	1,823	+1.3%
1936	1,768	−3.0%
1951	1,867	+5.6%
1961	1,857	−0.5%

Year	Pop.	±%
1971	2,002	+7.8%
1981	2,339	+16.8%
1991	2,483	+6.2%
2001	2,696	+8.6%

Source: Data from ISTAT
