= Porlezza =

- Comune
- Comune di Porlezza
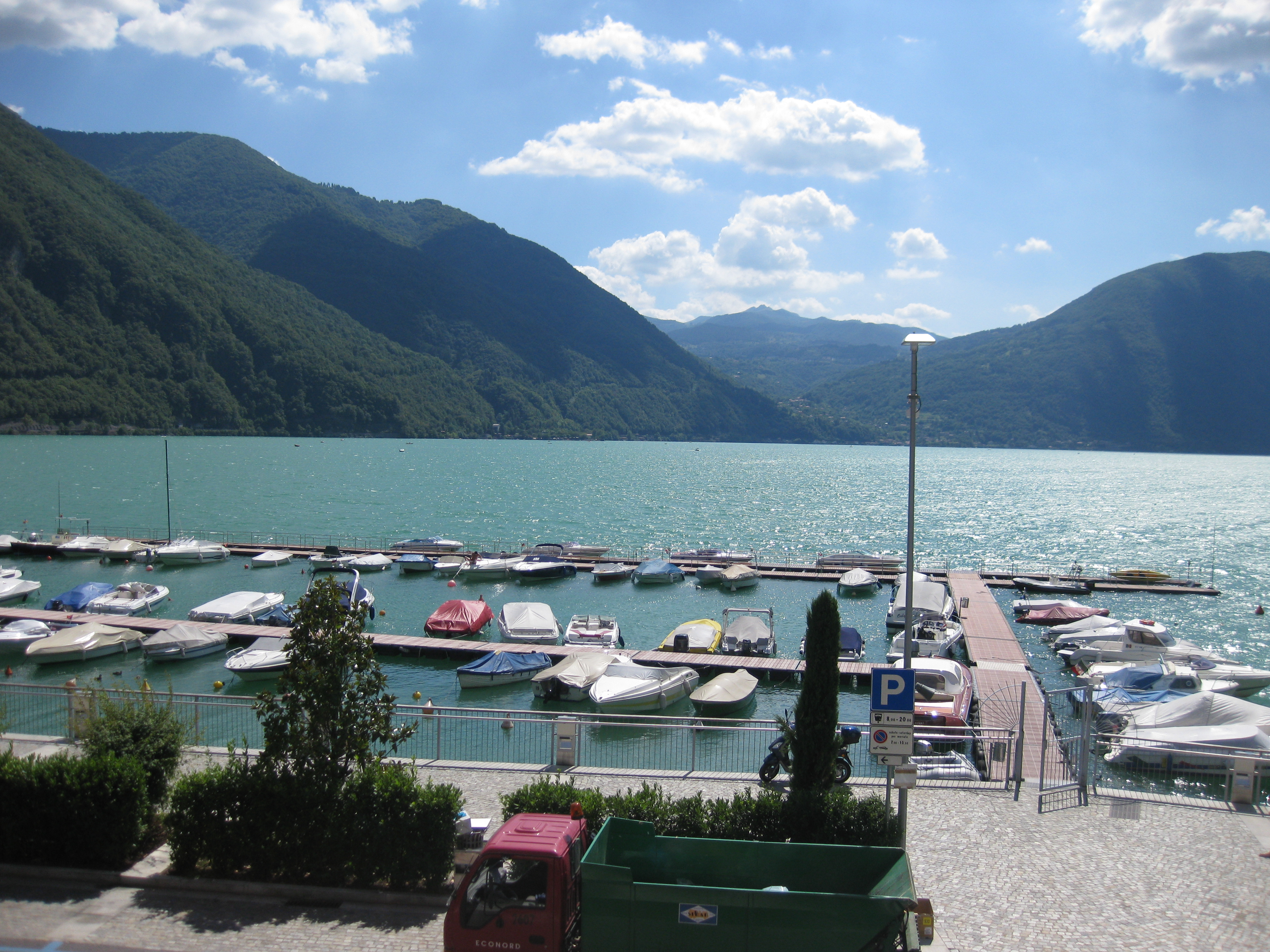
- View of the Lake

- Location within Italy Location within Lombardy
- Coordinates: 46°2′N 9°8′E
- Country: Italy
- Region: Lombardy
- Province: Como (CO)
- Frazioni: Agria, Begna, Cima, Tavordo

Government
  - Mayor: Sergio Erculiani

Area
  - Total: 18.64 km^{2} (7.20 sq mi)
- Elevation: 275 m (902 ft)

Population (31 March 2017)
  - Total: 4,941
  - Density: 265.1/km^{2} (686.5/sq mi)
- Demonym: Porlezzesi o Porlezzini
- Time zone: UTC+1 (CET)
  - Summer (DST): UTC+2 (CEST)
- Postal code: 22018
- Dialing code: 0344
- Website: Official website

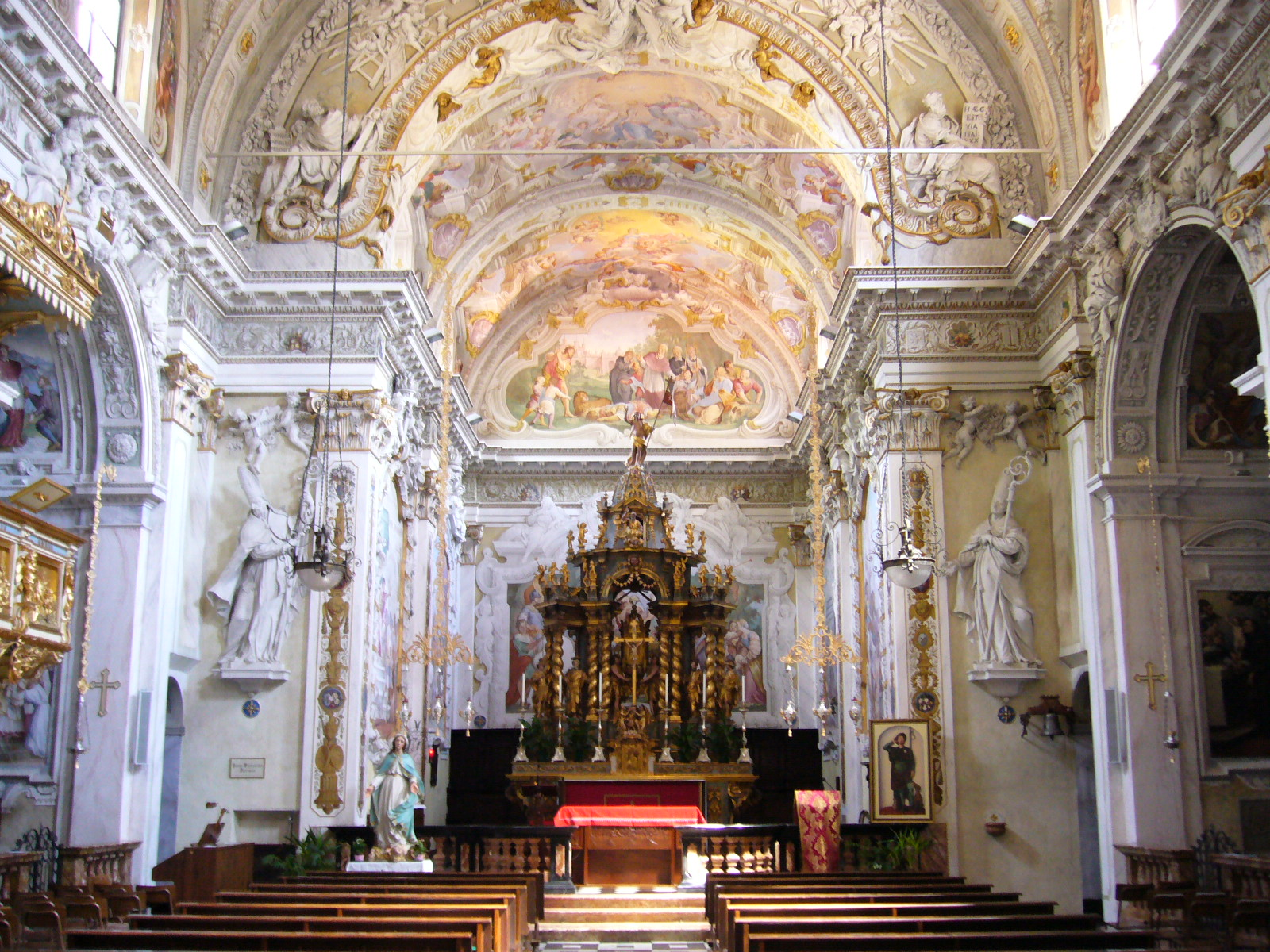
Interiori of the church of San Vittore.

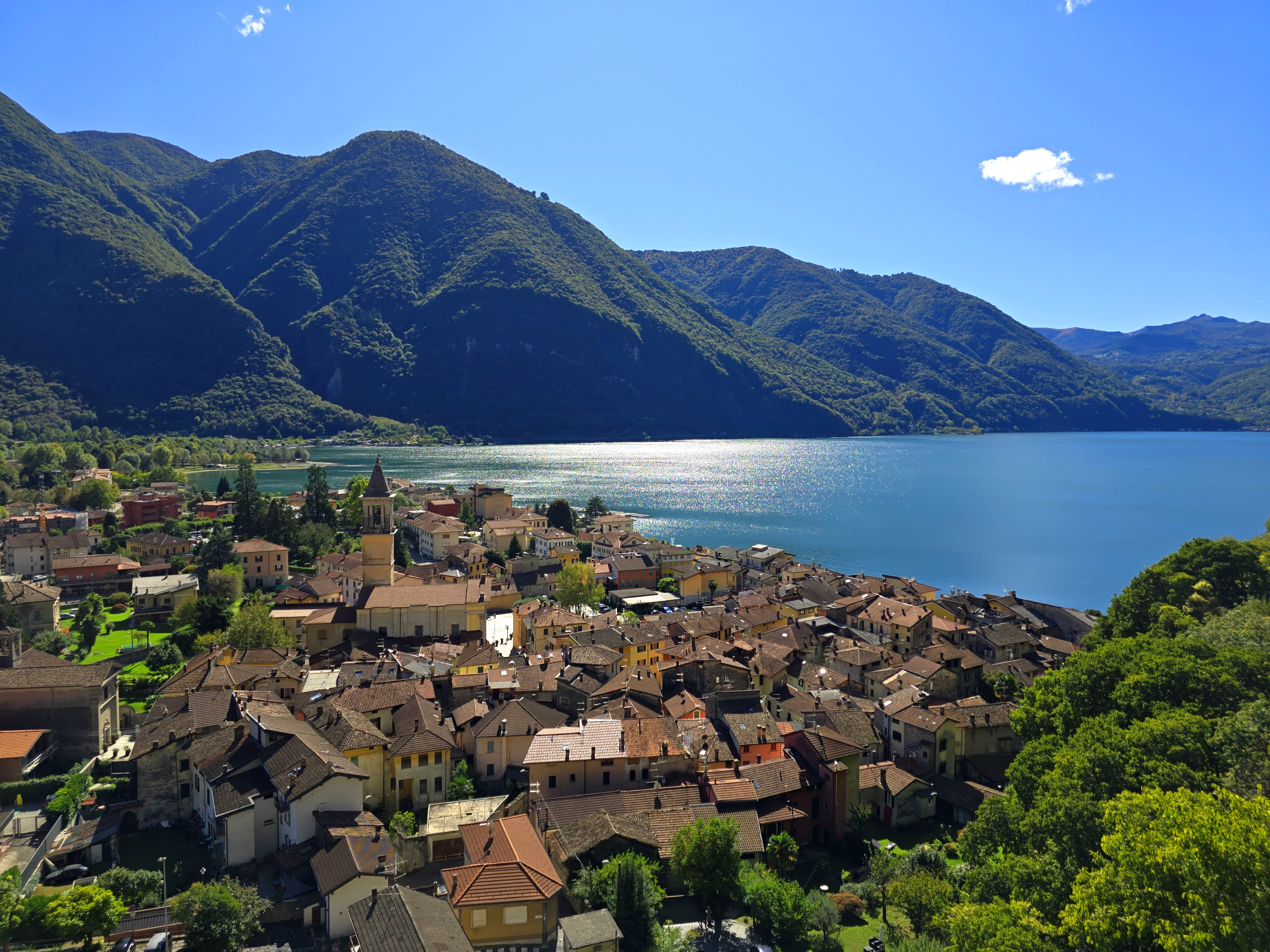
Porlezza and Lugano Lake, as seen from Oratory of San Rocco

Porlezza is a comune (municipality) on Lake Lugano in the Province of Como in the Italian region Lombardy, located about 60 kilometres (37 mi) north of Milan and about 25 kilometres (16 mi) north of Como.

Porlezza borders the following municipalities: Bene Lario, Carlazzo, Claino con Osteno, Corrido, Lenno, Ossuccio, Ponna, Val Rezzo, Valsolda.

Between 1873 and 1939, Porlezza was linked to Menaggio, on Lake Como, by the Menaggio–Porlezza railway, a steam hauled narrow gauge line built as part of a multi-modal transport link between Menaggio and Luino, on Lake Maggiore.
