= Bene Lario =

- Comune
- Comune di Bene Lario
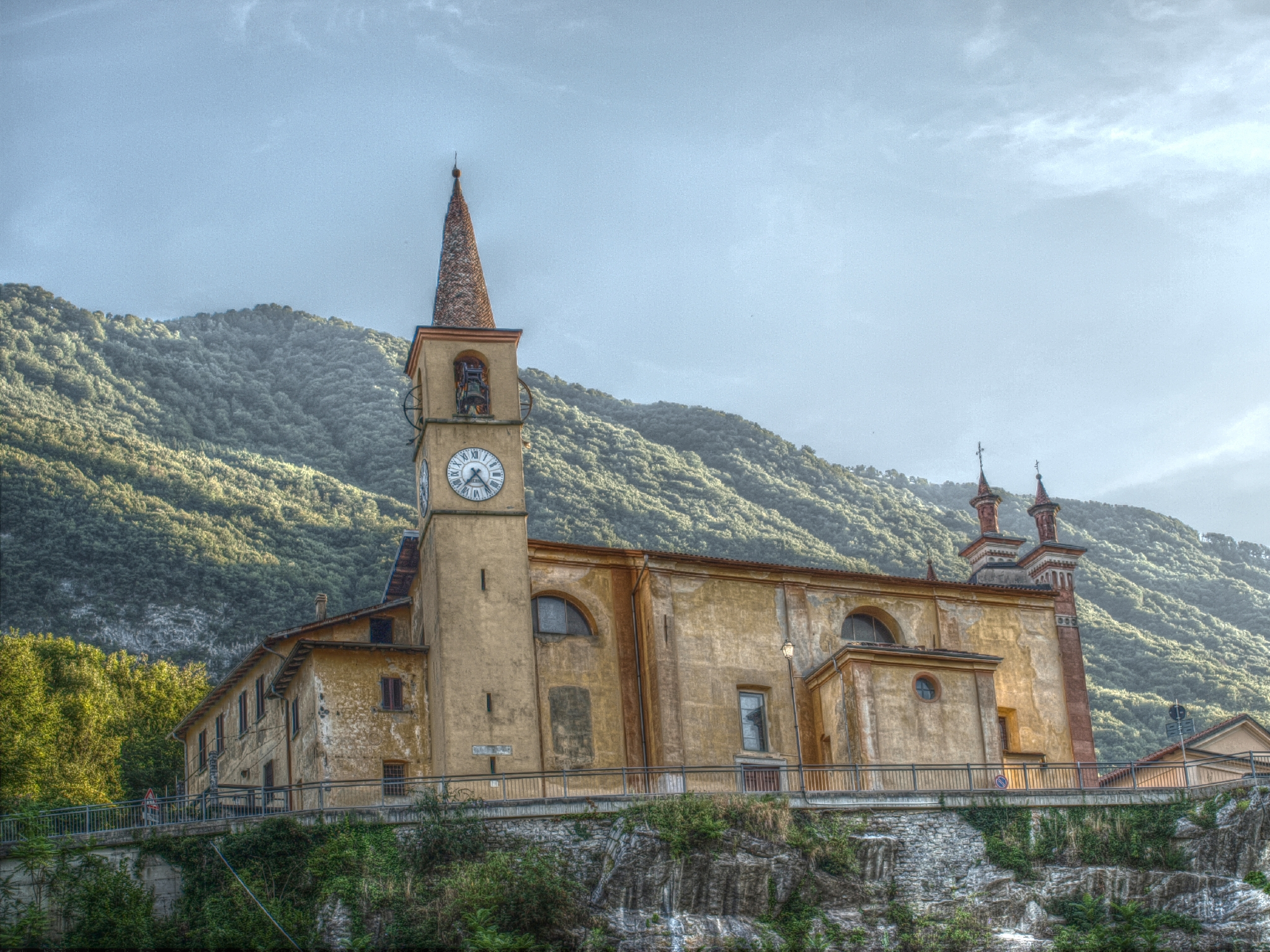
- Chiesa a Bene Lario the Town's Church

- Location within Italy Location within Lombardy
- Coordinates: 46°2′N 9°11′E
- Country: Italy
- Region: Lombardy
- Province: Province of Como (CO)

Area
  - Total: 5.7 km^{2} (2.2 sq mi)

Population (Dec. 2004)
  - Total: 319
  - Density: 56/km^{2} (140/sq mi)
- Time zone: UTC+1 (CET)
  - Summer (DST): UTC+2 (CEST)
- Postal code: 22010
- Dialing code: 0344

Bene Lario (Comasco: Bee) is a comune (municipality) in the Province of Como in the Italian region Lombardy, located about 60 kilometres (37 mi) north of Milan and about 25 kilometres (16 mi) northeast of Como. As of 31 December 2004, it had a population of 319 and an area of 5.7 square kilometres (2.2 mi^{2}).

Bene Lario borders the following municipalities: Carlazzo, Grandola ed Uniti, Lenno, Porlezza.

== Demographic evolution ==
Historical population

Year	Pop.	±%
1861	546	—
1871	490	−10.3%
1881	573	+16.9%
1901	387	−32.5%
1911	349	−9.8%

Year	Pop.	±%
1921	419	+20.1%
1931	357	−14.8%
1936	309	−13.4%
1951	328	+6.1%
1961	317	−3.4%

Year	Pop.	±%
1971	323	+1.9%
1981	305	−5.6%
1991	314	+3.0%
2001	310	−1.3%

Source: Data from ISTAT
