= Cusino =

Cusino Cusin (Lombard)
- Comune
- Comune di Cusino
- Location within Italy Location within Lombardy
- Coordinates: 46°4′N 9°9′E
- Country: Italy
- Region: Lombardy
- Province: Province of Como (CO)

Area
  - Total: 9.7 km^{2} (3.7 sq mi)

Population (Dec. 2004)
  - Total: 247
  - Density: 25/km^{2} (66/sq mi)
- Time zone: UTC+1 (CET)
  - Summer (DST): UTC+2 (CEST)
- Postal code: 22010
- Dialing code: 0344

Cusino (Comasco: Cusin [kyˈzĩː]) is a comune (municipality) in the Province of Como in the Italian region Lombardy, located about 70 kilometres (43 mi) north of Milan and about 30 kilometres (19 mi) north of Como. As of 31 December 2004, it had a population of 247 and an area of 9.7 km^{2} (3.7 sq mi).

Cusino borders the following municipalities: Carlazzo, Garzeno, Grandola ed Uniti, San Bartolomeo Val Cavargna.

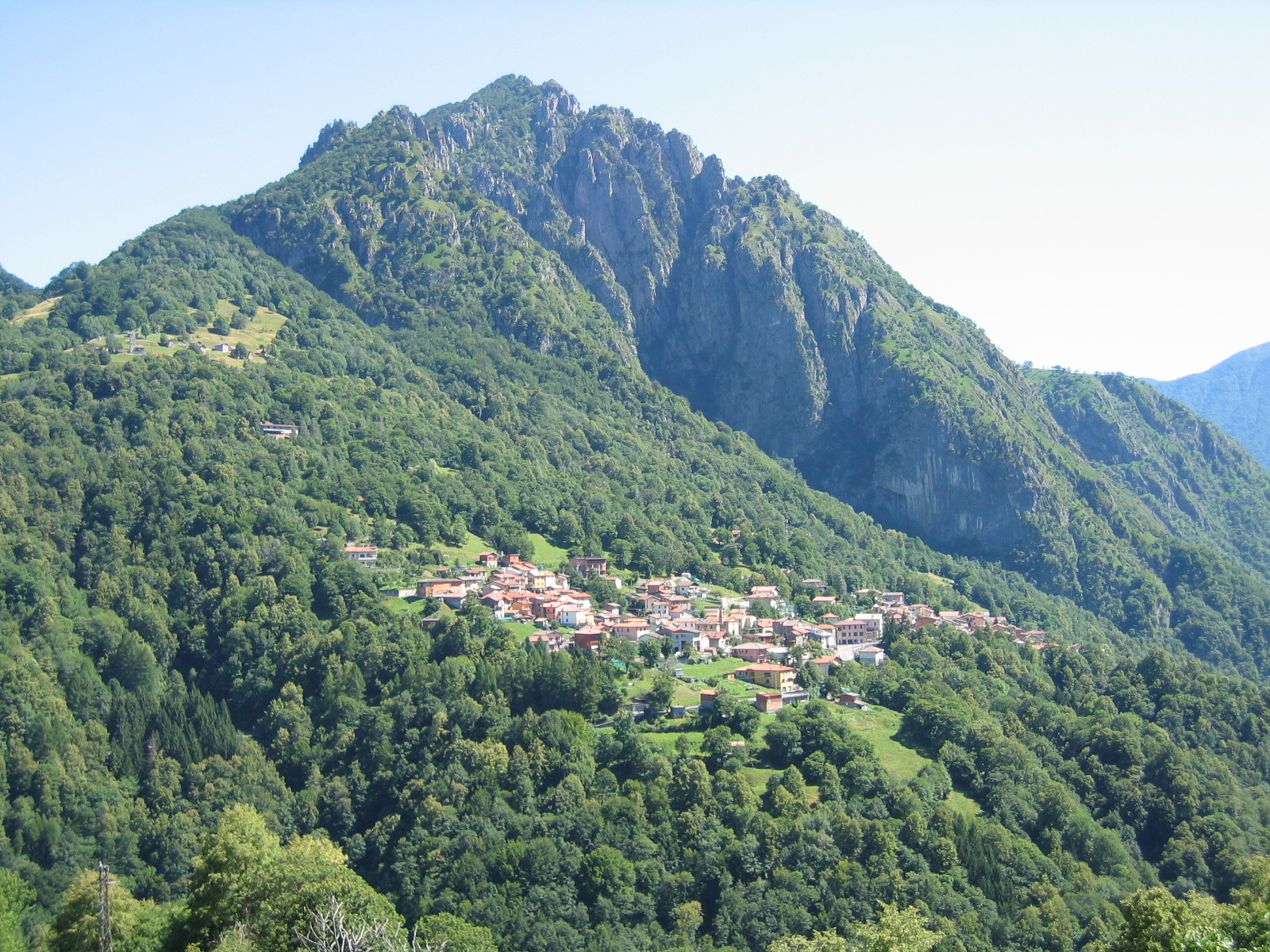
aerial view of the town

== Population history ==
Historical population

| Year | Pop. | ±% |
|---|---|---|
| 1861 | 286 | — |
| 1871 | 303 | +5.9% |
| 1881 | 299 | −1.3% |
| 1901 | 358 | +19.7% |
| 1911 | 340 | −5.0% |

| Year | Pop. | ±% |
|---|---|---|
| 1921 | 356 | +4.7% |
| 1931 | 294 | −17.4% |
| 1936 | 264 | −10.2% |
| 1951 | 300 | +13.6% |
| 1961 | 301 | +0.3% |

| Year | Pop. | ±% |
|---|---|---|
| 1971 | 271 | −10.0% |
| 1981 | 274 | +1.1% |
| 1991 | 277 | +1.1% |
| 2001 | 261 | −5.8% |

Source: Data from ISTAT
