= Villa Sola-Busca, Tremezzo =

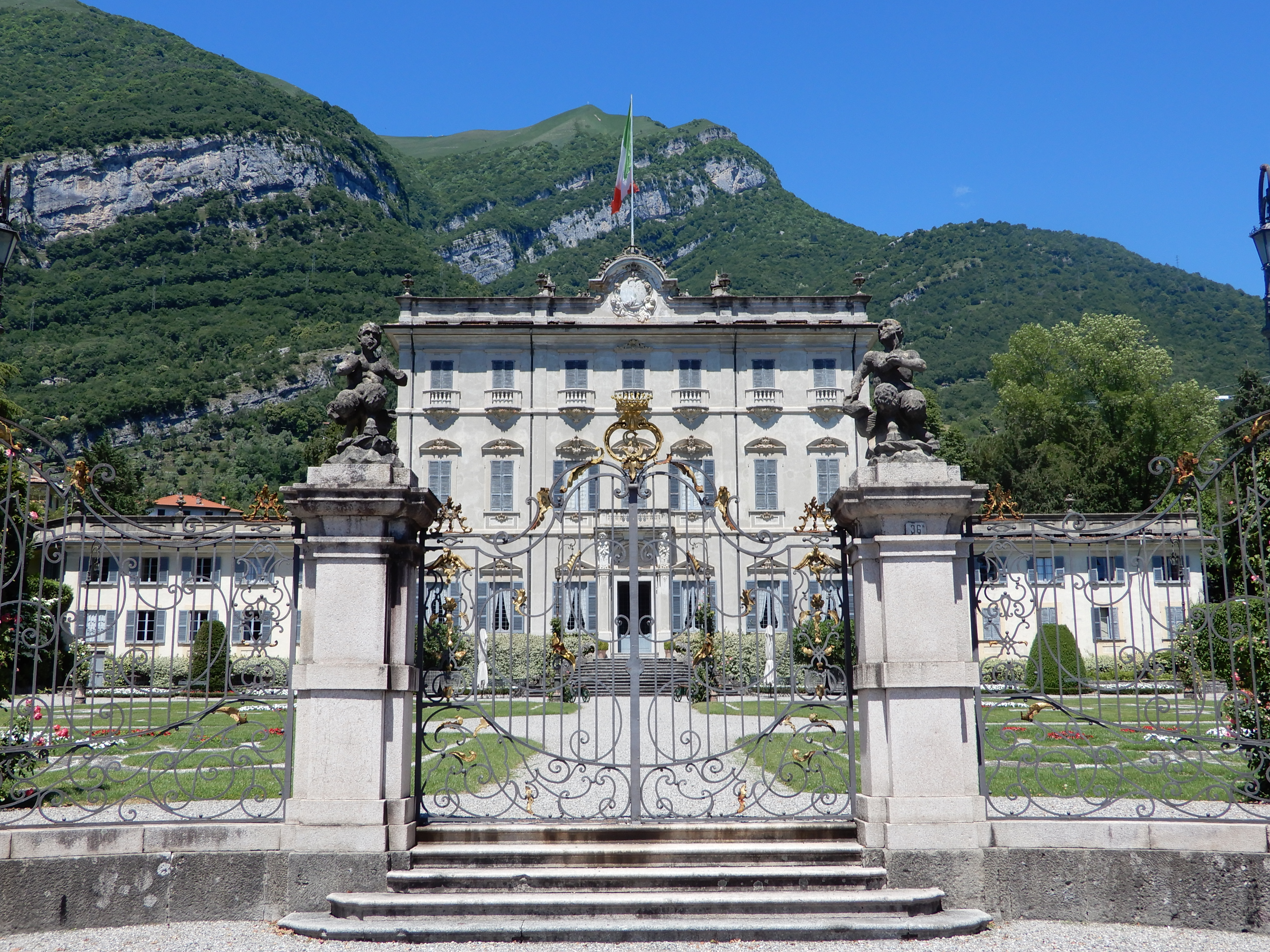

The Villa Sola-Busca, also called Villa La Quieta, is a Neoclassical style rural palace outside of the town of Tremezzo, on the shores of Lake Como in the Region of Lombardy, Italy.

== History ==
The villa was built by the Duchess of Carretto in the 17th-century, and then passed through the Brentano family to Gabrio Serbelloni in 1754, and then to his son, the Duke Giovanni Galeazzo Serbelloni. Under the Serbelloni ownership, the villa and the gardens were enlarged and refurbished in the present style.

The architect in 1813 was Francesco Bernardino Ferrari. The central tympanum sports the heraldic symbols of the Serbelloni family. The interiors were stuccoed by Muzio Canzio and painted by Francesco Conegliani. The ceilings have frescoes and canvases with Scenes from the Aenid by Conegliani. The gardens surround the villa, which stands adjacent to Villa Albertoni.

The villa hosted in the past the scholars Giuseppe Parini and Paolo Frisi. The villa is privately owned.
