= Paolo Pagani =

Italian painter

- Born: Paolo Pagani; 22 September 1665; Valsolda, Italy
- Died: 5 May 1716 (aged 50); Milan, Italy
- Known for: Painting
- Movement: Baroque/Mannerism

Paolo Pagani (22 September 1655 – 5 May 1716) also known as Paolo Antonio Pagani or Paolo Pagano, was an Italian Baroque/Mannerism painter of the 17th century.

== Biography ==
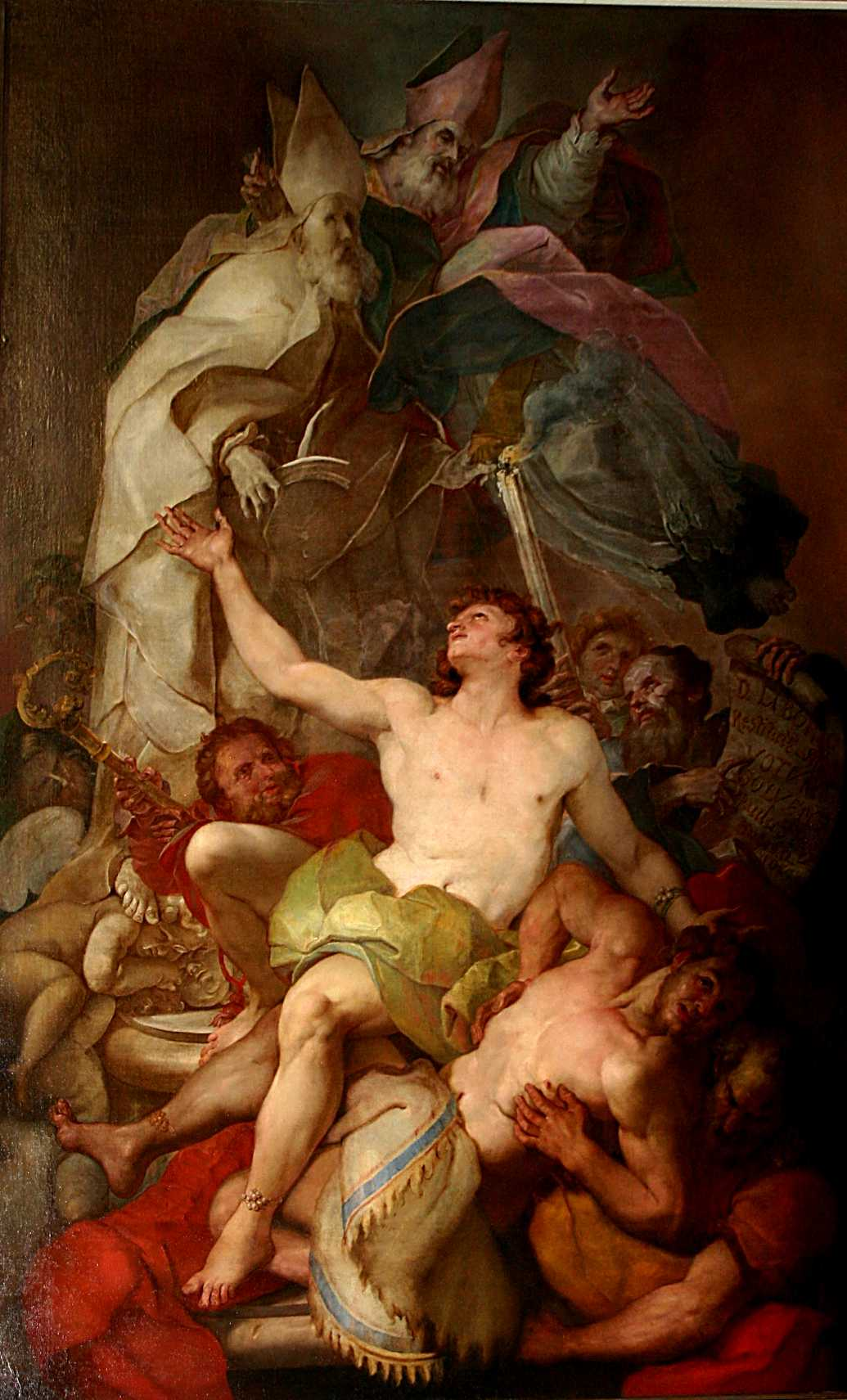
Saint Augustine chapel in Milan

Pagani was born in Valsolda, now a municipality in the Province of Como in the Italian region Lombardy, located about 60 kilometres (37 mi) north of Milan and bordering Switzerland. In 1667 he moved to Venice, where he made a series of ten aquatints from works by Giuseppe Diamantini (1621–1705). In 1675 he painted the Martyrdom of St. Erasmus. The painting was exhibited at Palazzo Molin, and is currently located in the National Gallery of Spinola in Genoa. In 1690 he was invited to Vienna by the Emperor Leopold I.

In 1696 he returned to Valsolda where he frescoed what is considered his masterwork: the nave of the parish church of San Martino. The work, completed the year of the birth of Tiepolo, who would master the art of the luminous fresco, astounds with the use of bright colours and swirling sotto in su perspective as a fresco technique. Michela Catalano, in an entry about Pagani on the Lombardia Beni Culturali website, states:

The result is an extraordinary invention of illusionistic perspective, consisting of two quadratura domes connected by transverse arches, framing a complex composition, in which different iconographic themes, in turn, connect the (painted narratives) of lives of the saints to their respective side chapels. (In the center of the second dome) is depicted the Assumption of the Virgin... (To its side, is depicted) .. the Preaching of (John) the Baptist; on the opposite side of the vault, and above the chapel dedicated to Saint Apollonia, Catherine and Lucy, (the space is) decorated with frescoes the death sentence of the three martyrs, carried to glory by angels on the ceiling of the first span. The fantastic, dizzying rush of the vault ... is a veritable compendium of the experiences drawn from the figurative painters in Venice and Central Europe, from research on chiaroscuro and naturalistic styles of the Venetian tenebrosi artists, and impacted by the Baroque of Rubens, a reflection on models of Michelangelo, Tintoretto and other mannerists, supplemented by a precocious adoption of the illusionistic perspective methods of Andrea Pozzo.

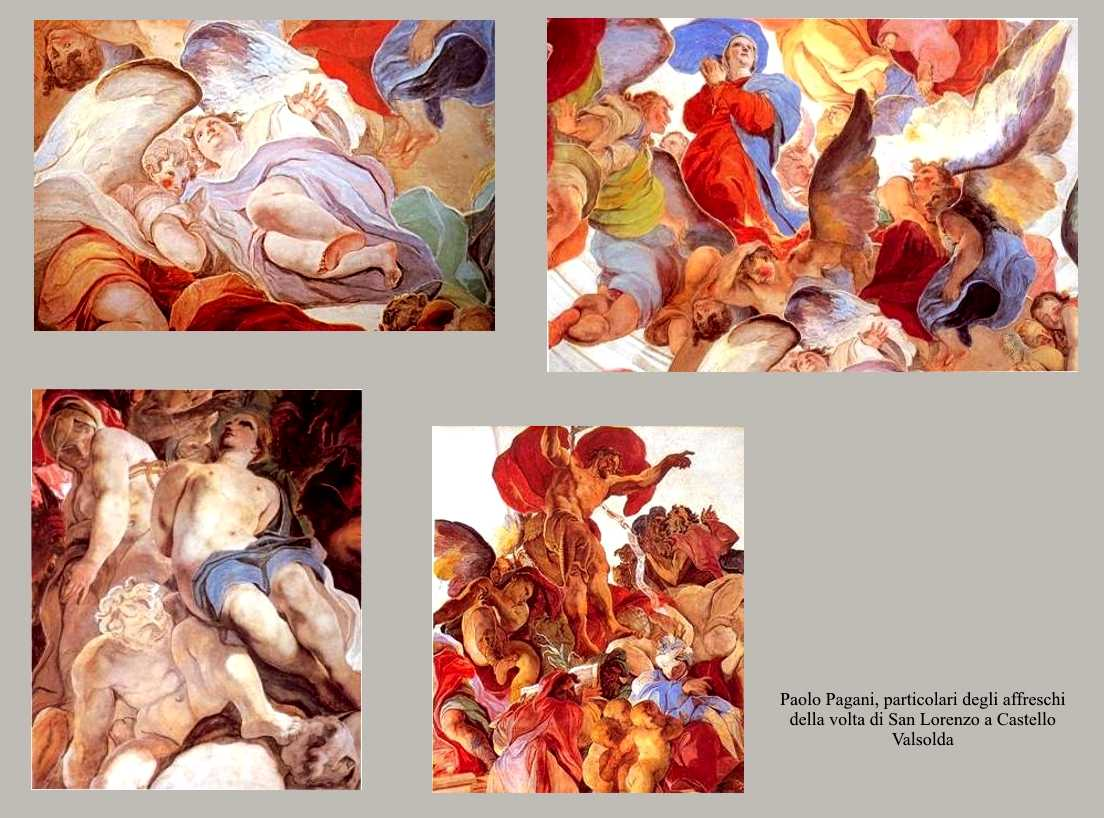
Details of frescoes from the church of San Martino in Valsolda

Pagani died in Milan on 5 May 1716. His former house in Valsolda was converted into a museum dedicated to his work in 2004.

== Bibliography ==
- Federica Bianchi, Paolo Pagani 1955-1716, Electa, Milan, 1998.
- Alessandro Morandotti, Paolo Pagani e i Pagani di Valsolda, Fidia Edizioni d'Arte, Lugano, 2000.
- Alessandro Morandotti, Gabriele Medolago, Antonio Zaccaria, Paolo Pagani: A Cerete. L'Estasi di Santa Teresa, Lubrina Bramani Editore, Bergamo, 2010.
