= Tremezzo =

- Comune
- Comune di Tremezzo
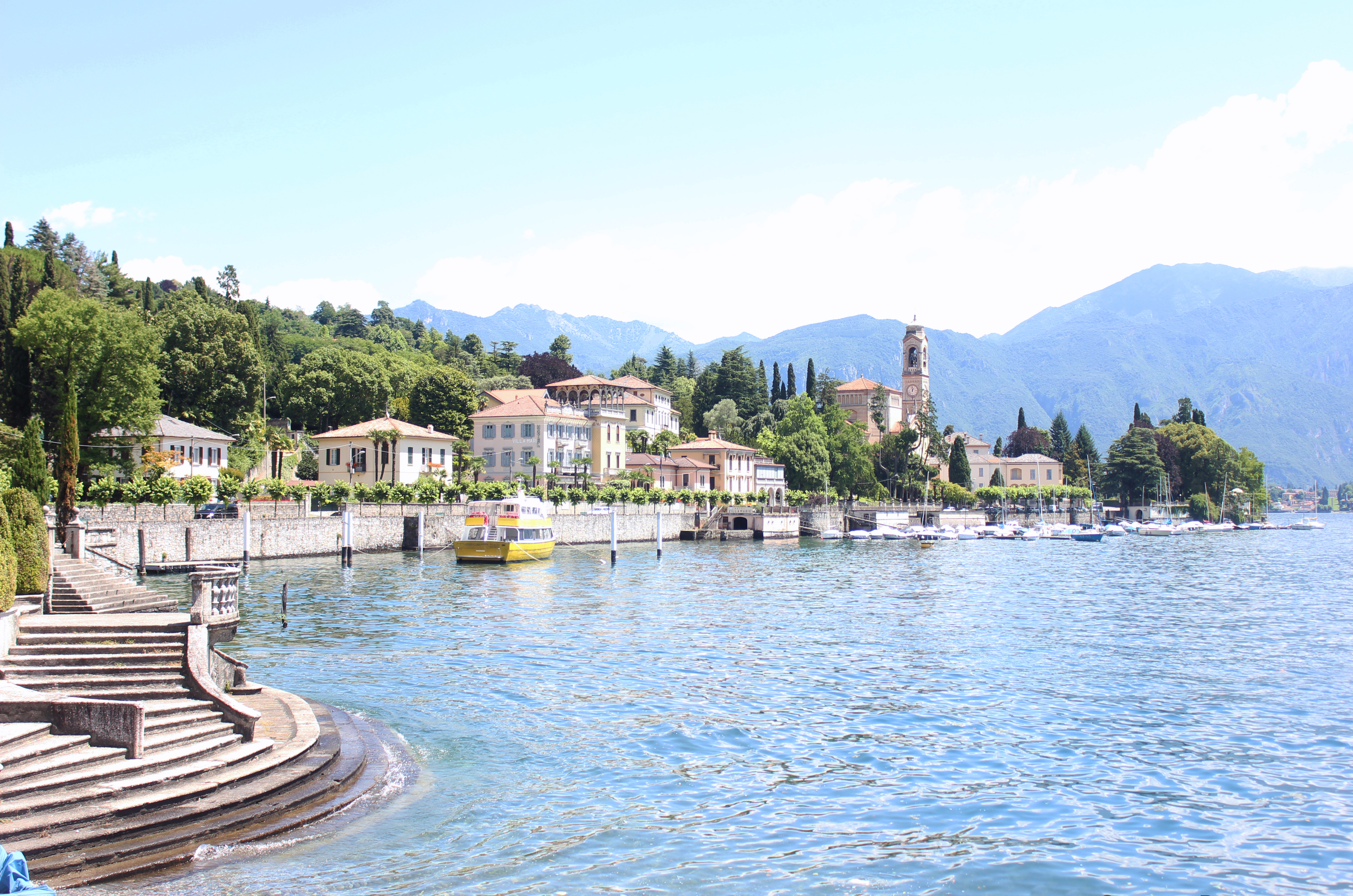

- Location within Italy Location within Lombardy
- Coordinates: 45°59′N 9°14′E
- Country: Italy
- Region: Lombardy
- Province: Como (CO)
- Frazioni: Rogaro

Government
  - Mayor: Mauro Guerra (Alleanza Democratica; elected 2004-06-13)

Area
  - Total: 8.4 km^{2} (3.2 sq mi)
- Elevation: 200 m (660 ft)

Population (Dec. 2004)
  - Total: 1,314
  - Density: 160/km^{2} (410/sq mi)
- Demonym: Tremezzini
- Time zone: UTC+1 (CET)
  - Summer (DST): UTC+2 (CEST)
- Postal code: 22019
- Dialing code: 0344

Tremezzo is a comune (or municipality) of some 1,300 people in the Province of Como, in the Italian region Lombardy. It is one of I Borghi più belli d'Italia ("The most beautiful villages of Italy").

It is located on the western shore of Lake Como between Mezzegra to the southwest and Griante to the northeast, and about 20 kilometres (12 mi) from Como. Tremezzo, which has an area of 8.4 square kilometres (3.2 mi^{2}), also borders the territory of the following communes: Lenno (south and west of Mezzegra), Menaggio (north of Griante), Grandola ed Uniti (inland from Menaggio) and, on the facing shore of the lake, Bellagio and Lezzeno.

As well as the capoluogo of Tremezzo, the area of the commune includes the frazione Rogaro, birthplace of the architect Pietro Lingeri.

Tremezzo is best known as a tourist resort—it was a favourite of Konrad Adenauer—and for its villas, of which the most famous is the Villa Carlotta with its much-admired gardens, and Villa Sola-Busca. The Brentano family hails from Tremezzo; in the 17th century the family relocated to the Free City of Frankfurt. Members of the family include 19th century German Romanticist novelist Clemens Brentano and his sister Bettina von Arnim.

The comune of Tremezzo was united with Mezzegra, Ossuccio, and Lenno to form a single municipality named Tremezzina following the election of the mayor on 25 May 2014.

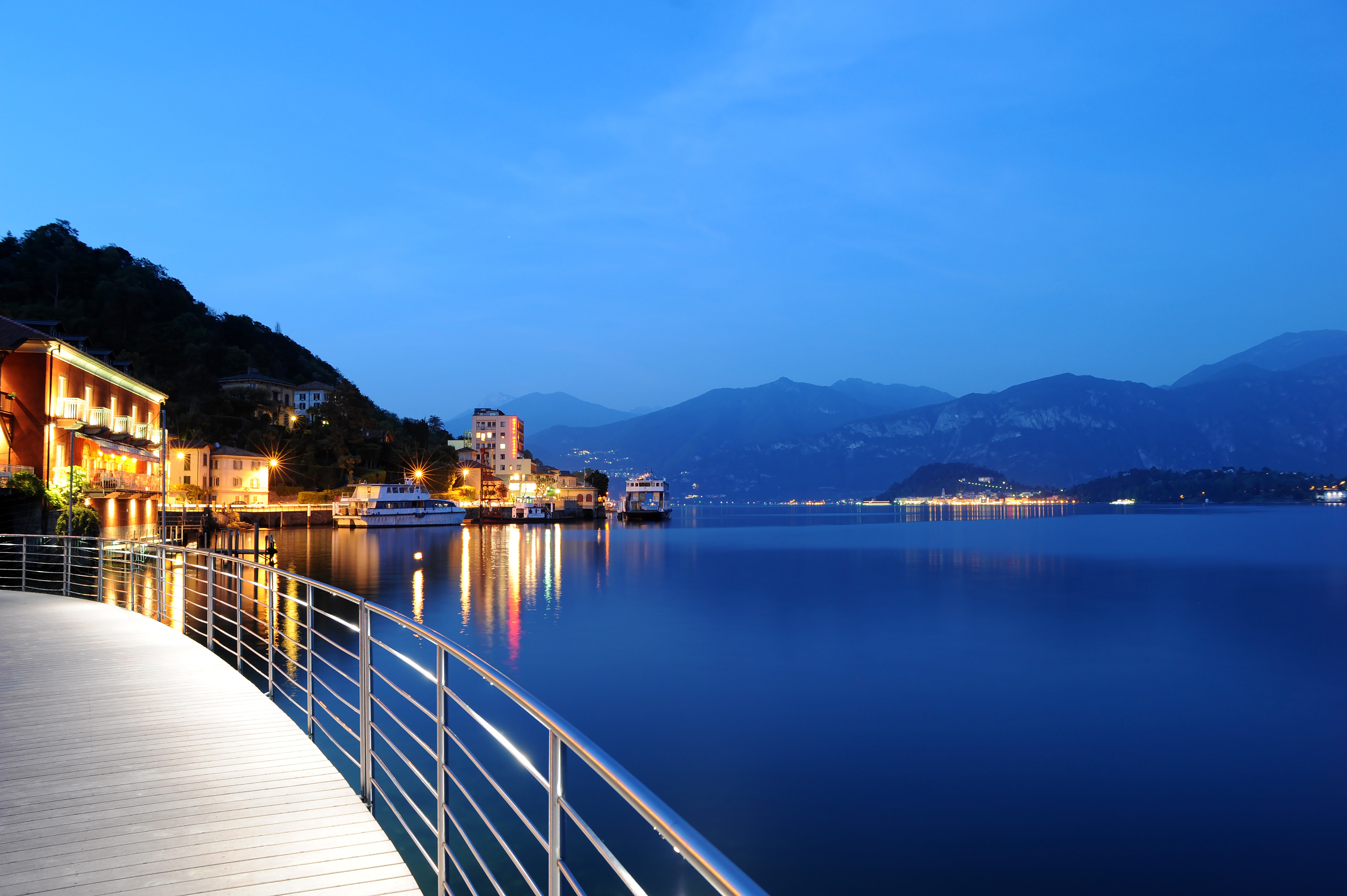
Tremezzo by night

== Demographic evolution ==
Historical population

Year	Pop.	±%
1861	1,240	—
1871	1,367	+10.2%
1881	1,487	+8.8%
1901	1,618	+8.8%
1911	1,774	+9.6%

Year	Pop.	±%
1921	1,799	+1.4%
1931	1,626	−9.6%
1936	1,696	+4.3%
1951	1,655	−2.4%
1961	1,484	−10.3%

Year	Pop.	±%
1971	1,376	−7.3%
1981	1,288	−6.4%
1991	1,393	+8.2%
2001	1,314	−5.7%

Source: Data from ISTAT
