= Mezzegra =

- Comune
- Comune di Mezzegra
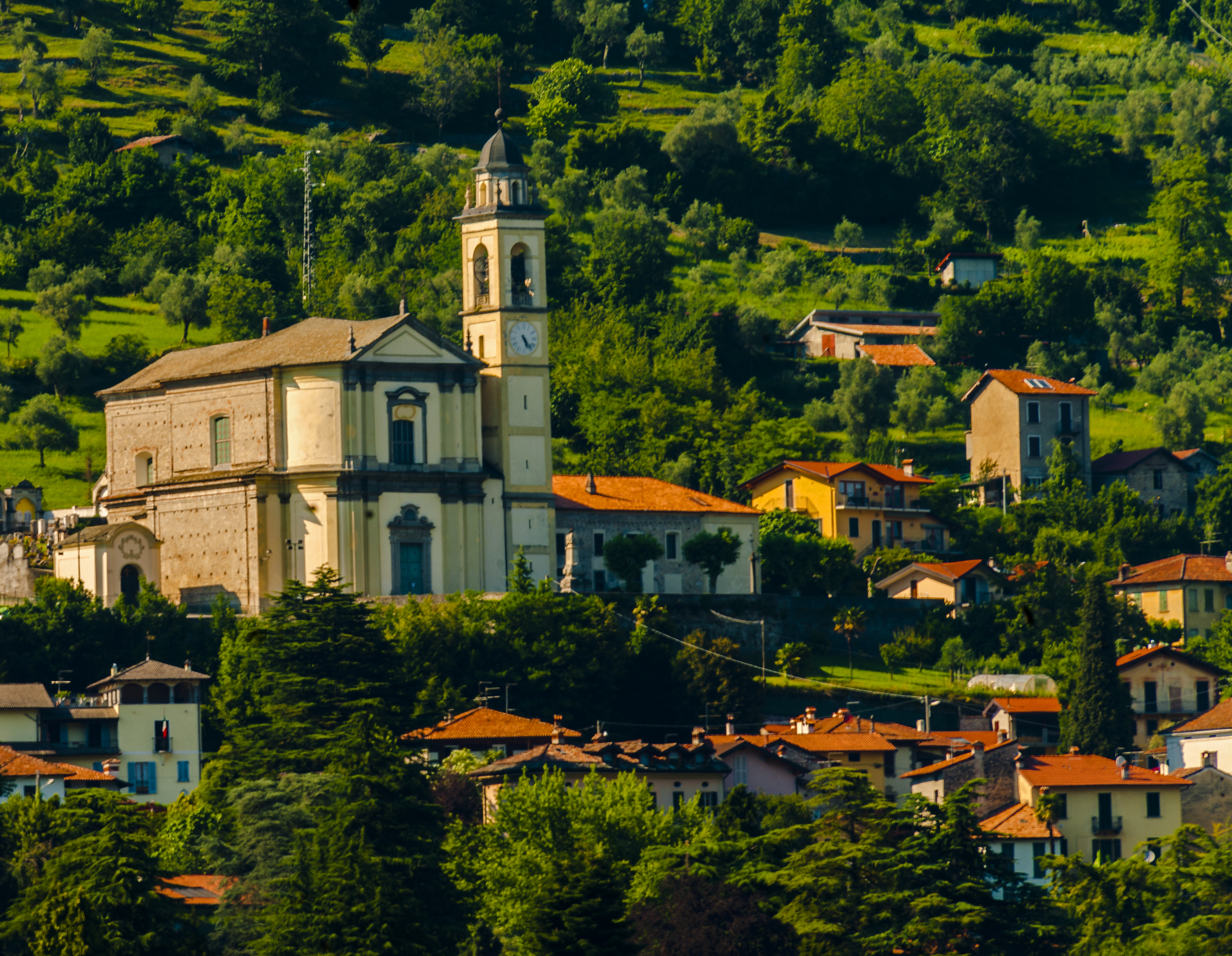

- Location within Italy Location within Lombardy
- Coordinates: 45°59′3″N 9°12′21″E
- Country: Italy
- Region: Lombardy
- Province: Province of Como (CO)
- Frazioni: Azzano, Giulino

Government
  - Mayor: Bruno Bordoli (elected 2004-06-13)

Area
  - Total: 3.41 km^{2} (1.32 sq mi)
- Elevation: 206 m (676 ft)

Population (Dec. 2004)
  - Total: 1,016
  - Density: 298/km^{2} (772/sq mi)
- Demonym: Mezzegresi
- Time zone: UTC+1 (CET)
  - Summer (DST): UTC+2 (CEST)
- Postal code: 22010
- Dialing code: 0344

Mezzegra is a former comune (municipality) in the Province of Como in the Italian region Lombardy. Since 21 January 2014 it is part of the comune of Tremezzina.

== Geography ==
It lies on the northwestern shore of Lake Como between Tremezzo and Lenno at the foot of Monte Tremezzo, elevation 1,700 metres (5,600 ft) above sea level. It is about 60 kilometres (37 mi) north of Milan and about 20 kilometres (12 mi) northeast of Como. As of 31 December 2004, it had a population of 1,016 and an area of 3.4 square kilometres (1.3 mi^{2}).

Mezzegra borders the following municipalities: Grandola ed Uniti, Lenno, Tremezzo.

The Comune di Mezzegra will be united to Lenno, Ossuccio and Tremezzo to form a single municipality named Tremezzina: the new administration will be formalized after election of the mayor on 25 May 2014

== History ==
On 28 April 1945 in Giulino, a frazione of Mezzegra, Benito Mussolini and his lover Claretta Petacci were executed by communist partisans.

== Demographic history ==
Historical population

Year	Pop.	±%
1861	792	—
1871	867	+9.5%
1881	802	−7.5%
1901	842	+5.0%
1911	943	+12.0%

Year	Pop.	±%
1921	969	+2.8%
1931	1,102	+13.7%
1936	1,105	+0.3%
1951	1,054	−4.6%
1961	1,007	−4.5%

Year	Pop.	±%
1971	1,007	+0.0%
1981	979	−2.8%
1991	896	−8.5%
2001	952	+6.2%

Source: Data from ISTAT
