= Corrido, Lombardy =

Corrido Còrid, Coret (Lombard)
- Comune
- Comune di Corrido
- Location within Italy Location within Lombardy
- Coordinates: 46°3′N 9°8′E
- Country: Italy
- Region: Lombardy
- Province: Province of Como (CO)

Area
  - Total: 6.3 km^{2} (2.4 sq mi)

Population (Dec. 2004)
  - Total: 762
  - Density: 120/km^{2} (310/sq mi)
- Time zone: UTC+1 (CET)
  - Summer (DST): UTC+2 (CEST)
- Postal code: 22010
- Dialing code: 0344

Corrido (Comasco: Còrid [ˈkɔrit] or Coret [ˈkɔret])is a comune (municipality) in the Province of Como in the Italian region Lombardy, located about 60 kilometres (37 mi) north of Milan and about 25 kilometres (16 mi) north of Como. As of 31 December 2004, it had a population of 762 and an area of 6.3 km^{2} (2.4 sq mi).

Corrido borders the following municipalities: Carlazzo, Porlezza, Val Rezzo.

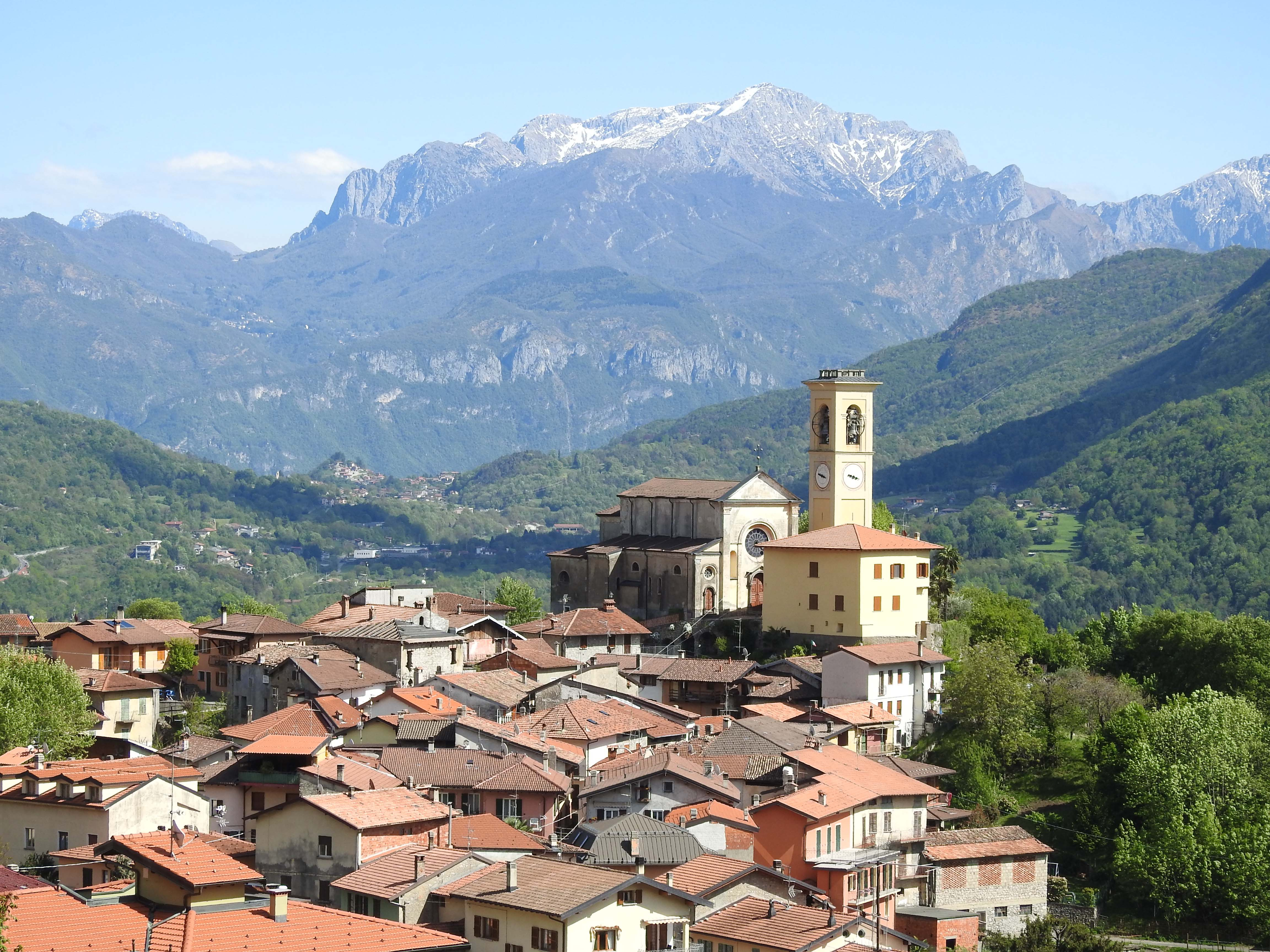
Corrido

== Demographic evolution ==
Historical population

Year	Pop.	±%
1861	638	—
1871	590	−7.5%
1881	667	+13.1%
1901	613	−8.1%
1911	639	+4.2%

Year	Pop.	±%
1921	648	+1.4%
1931	648	+0.0%
1936	595	−8.2%
1951	581	−2.4%
1961	551	−5.2%

Year	Pop.	±%
1971	612	+11.1%
1981	658	+7.5%
1991	722	+9.7%
2001	730	+1.1%

Source: Data from ISTAT
