= Paola del Medico =

Swiss singer (born 1950)

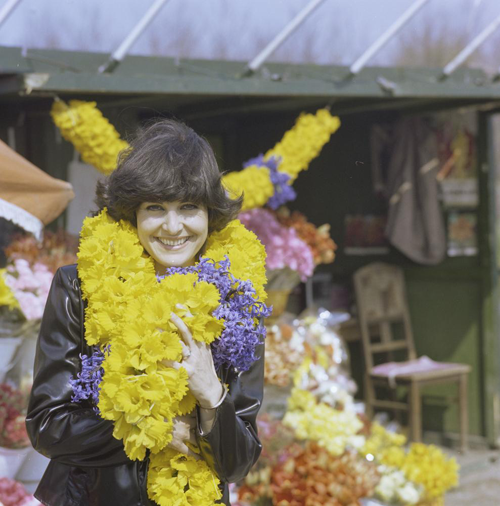
- Del Medico in 1980
- Born: 5 October 1950 (age 75); Saint-Gall, Switzerland
- Other names: Paola Felix
- Occupations: Singer, TV host
- Spouse: Kurt Felix (m. 1980; died 2012)

Paola del Medico Felix (née del Medico; born 5 October 1950) is a Swiss singer.

== Career ==
Born in Saint-Gall to an Italian father and a Swiss mother, Paola del Medico has sung mostly in German and French. She represented Switzerland at the Eurovision Song Contest 1969 with the song "Bonjour, bonjour", finishing in fifth place.

In 1980, she represented Switzerland for a second time in the Eurovision Song Contest, where she finished in fourth place with "Cinéma".

Between 1981 and 1990 she co-hosted Verstehen Sie Spaß?, a candid camera-style show, for the German TV station ARD together with her husband Kurt Felix.

She was in contention to represent Germany for the Eurovision Song Contest 1982 with the song "Peter Pan", but she finished 2nd in the national final.

In 2025, she reprised "Cinéma" in the Eurovision Song Contest 2025 grand final.

== Discography ==
=== Albums ===
- 1970: Die grossen Erfolge
- 1974: Paola
- 1978: Blue Bayou
- 1980: Lieder die ich liebe
- 1981: Ihre größten Erfolge
- 1981: Frohe Weihnachten mit Paola und den Trixis
- 1983: Rosafarben
- 1988: Kinderlieder-Hitparade mit Paola und den Sonnenschein-Kindern
- 1989: Meine Lieder
- 2000: Paola am Blue Bayou

=== Singles ===
- Für alle Zeiten 1968
- Regentropfen 1968
- Bonjour, bonjour 1969
- Stille Wasser die sind tief 1969
- So ist das Leben 1970
- Für uns beide (Green Green Trees) 1970
- Glück und Leid 1970
- Emporte-moi sur ton manège 1970
- So wie du 1971
- Überall ist Liebe 1971
- Lass die Liebe besteh'n 1972
- Es geht um dich – es geht um mich (I'm on My Way) 1972
- Ich tanz' nach deiner Pfeife (The Pied Piper) 1973
- Ich gestehe alles 1973
- Capri-Fischer 1974
- Addio, mein Napoli 1974
- Das Glück im Leben ist ein Schatz 1975
- Weisse Rosen aus Athen 1975
- Rendezvous um vier 1975
- Schade um den Mondenschein 1976
- Le livre blanc 1977
- Morgen bekommst du mehr von mir 1977
- Lonely blue boy 1977
- Blue Bayou 1978
- Ich bin kein Hampelmann (Substitute) 1978
- Vogel der Nacht 1979
- Wie du (Bright eyes) 1979
- Ich sehe Tränen wenn du lachst 1980
- Cinéma 1980
- Mit dir leben (Love me tender) 1980
- Der Teufel und der junge Mann 1980
- Liebe ist nicht nur ein Wort 1981
- Mein Geschenk für dich (Happy everything) 1981
- Wenn du heimkommst 1982
- Peter Pan 1982
- Ich hab in's Paradies gesehn (I've never been to me) 1982
- Träume mal schön von Hawaii 1983
- Bitte hilf mir heute nacht 1983
- Rosafarben (Sarà quel che sarà) 1983
- Engel brauchen Liebe 1984
- Die Nacht der Nächte 1984
- Mode 1985
- Wahrheit & Liebe 1985
- Am Anfang einer neuen Liebe 1986
- Die Männer im allgemeinen 1987
- Rose der Nacht 1989

Awards and achievements
Preceded by Gianni Mascolo with "Guardando il sole"	Switzerland in the Eurovision Song Contest; 1969	Succeeded by Henri Dès with "Retour"
Preceded by Peter, Sue & Marc & Pfuri Gorps & Kniri with "Trödler und Co"	Switzerland in the Eurovision Song Contest; 1980	Succeeded by Peter, Sue & Marc with "Io senza te"
