= Kurt Felix (television presenter) =

Swiss television presenter and entertainer

- Born: 27 March 1941; Wil, Switzerland
- Died: 16 May 2012 (aged 71); Saint-Gall, Switzerland
- Occupations: TV host, entertainer
- Spouse: Paola del Medico (m. 1980)

Kurt Felix (27 March 1941 – 16 May 2012) was a Swiss television presenter and entertainer.

== Biography ==
In the 1970s, Felix developed and hosted Teleboy, the most watched TV-programme in the history of the Swiss television (DRS). The show is considered to be a predecessor of Surprise, Surprise. Felix and his wife, singer Paola Del Medico, hosted Verstehen Sie Spaß?, a Candid Camera-style show, for the German TV station ARD between 1981 and 1990. Each episode attracted around 30 million viewers in Central Europe. He developed several TV-formats popular in Germany and Switzerland such as Stoeck, Wyss, Stich in 1968 (one of the first interactive programmes of the world) or That's TV (Chaplin-award, Rose d'Or award);

Felix died in St. Gallen due to thymoma on 16 May 2012.
