= Tremezzina =

Tremezzina Tremezéna (Lombard)
- Comune
- Comune di Tremezzina
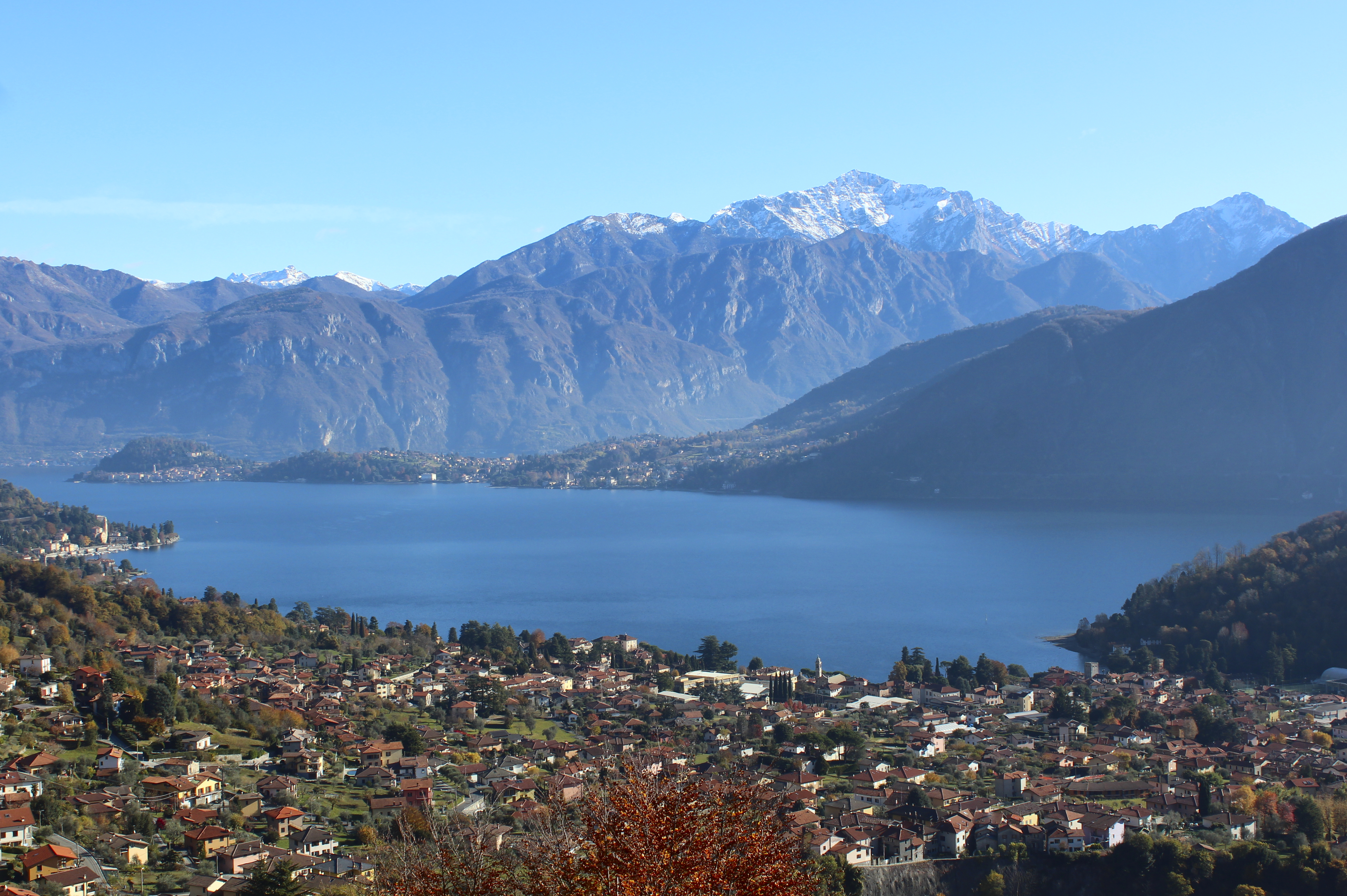
- Panorama of Tremezzina

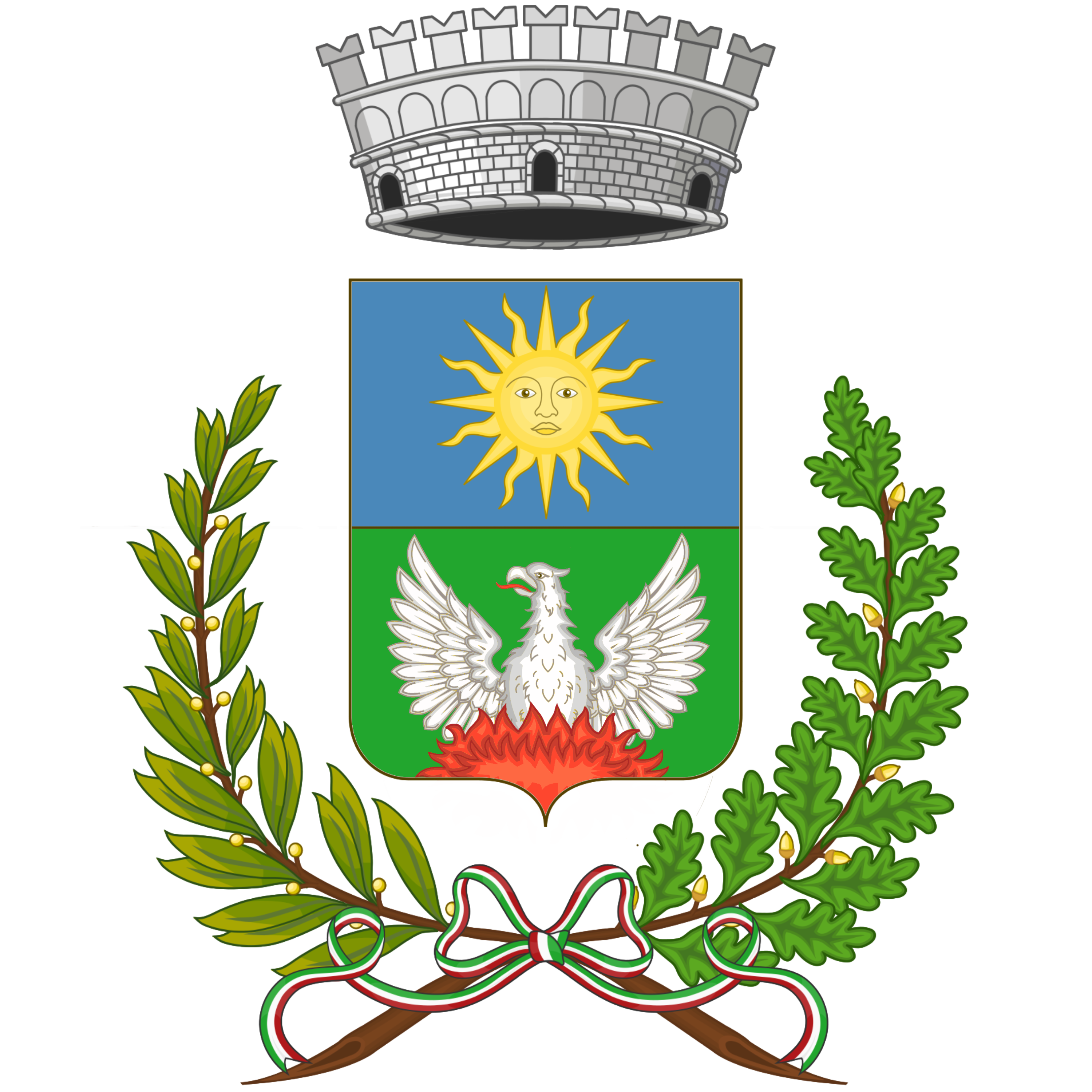
- Coat of arms

- Location within Italy Location within Lombardy
- Coordinates: 45°59′04.84″N 9°12′54.14″E
- Country: Italy
- Region: Lombardy
- Province: Province of Como (CO)
- Frazioni: Lenno, Mezzegra, Ossuccio, Tremezzo

Area
  - Total: 28.38 km^{2} (10.96 sq mi)
- Elevation ISTAT: 200 m (660 ft)

Population (31-12-2012)ISTAT
  - Total: 4,170
  - Density: 147/km^{2} (381/sq mi)
- Time zone: UTC+1 (CET)
  - Summer (DST): UTC+2 (CEST)
- Postal code: 22019
- Dialing code: 0344
- created in 2014

Tremezzina (Comasco: Tremezéna [tremeˈdzena]) is a comune in the province of Como, in Lombardy, that formed on 25 May 2014 from a merger of the comunes of Lenno, Mezzegra, Ossuccio and Tremezzo.

A referendum to create this comune was held on 1 December 2013. The referendum was passed with 63% yes and 37% no votes.

The comune of Tremezzina was previously created in 1928 over Lenno, Mezzegra and Tremezzo, and divided into the separate comunes in 1947.
