= Ajda Pekkan discography =

- Studio albums: 20
- Live albums: 1
- Compilation albums: 5
- Singles: 67

This article contains information about all releases by Turkish pop artist Ajda Pekkan.

== Albums ==
=== Studio albums ===
- Ajda Pekkan (1968)
- Fecri Ebcioğlu Sunar: Ajda Pekkan (1969)
- Ajda Pekkan Vol. 3 (1972)
- Ajda (1975)
- Süperstar (1977)
- Pour Lui (1978)
- Süperstar 2 (1979)
- Sen Mutlu Ol (1981)
- Sevdim Seni (1982)
- Süperstar '83 (1983)
- Ajda Pekkan ve Beş Yıl Önce On Yıl Sonra (1985)
- Süperstar 4 (1987)
- Ajda 1990 (1990)
- Seni Seçtim (1991)
- Ajda '93 (1993)
- Ajda Pekkan (1996)
- Cool Kadın (2006)
- Aynen Öyle (2008)
- Farkın Bu (2011)
- Ajda Pekkan & Muazzez Abacı (2014)
- Ajda (2021)

=== Compilation albums ===
- Ajda (1975)
- Unutulmayanlar (1990)
- Hoşgör Sen (1992)
- The Best of Ajda (1998)
- Diva (2000)

=== Live albums ===
- La Fete A L’Olympia (1976)

== Singles ==
Year	Record company	Title	Notes
1964	Serengil Plak	"Abidik Gubidik Twist/Göz Göz Değdi Bana"	
1965	Serengil Plak	"Her Yerde Kar Var/Onyedi Yaşında"	
1966	Odeon	"Moda Yolunda/Serseri"	
1966	Odeon	"Seviyorum/İlkokulda Tanışmıştık"	
1967	Regal	"İki Yabancı/Bang Bang"	
1967	Regal	"Dönmem Sana/İlk Aşkım"	
1967	Regal	"Oyalama Beni/Saklanbaç"	"Saklanbaç" is an arrangement of Charade.
1967	Regal	"Aşk Oyunu/Et C'est Pour Toi"	
1967	Regal	"Boşvermişim Dünyaya/Sevdiğim Adam"	
1968	Regal	"Dünya Dönüyor/Üç Kalp"	
1968	Regal	"Kimdir Bu Sevgili/Onu Bana Bırak"	
1968	Regal	"Özleyiş/Ve Ben Şimdi"	
1968	Regal	"Boş Sokak/Çapkın"	
1969	Regal	"Ne Tadı Var Bu Dünyanın/Mesut Ol Sen"	
1969	Regal	"İki Yüzlü Aşk/Erkekleri Tanıyın"	
1969	Regal	"Durdurun Şu Zaman/Yaşamak Ne Güzel Şey"	
1969	Regal	"Ben Bir Köylü Kızıyım/Tatlı Dünya"	
1969	Regal	"Son Arzu/Üzgün Yüzlü Dertli Akşam"	
1969	Regal	"Ay Doğarken/Sev Gönlünce"	
1970	Phillips	"Sensiz Yıllarda/Olmadı Gitti"	
1970	Phillips	"Yağmur/Tek Yaşanır mı"	
1971	Phillips	"Gençlik Yılları/Bilmece Bildirmece"	
1971	Phillips	"Yalnızlıktan Bezdim/Gel"	
1971	Phillips	"Zigeuner Müssen Singen/Der Große Abschied"	Published in Germany.
1971	Phillips	"Sen Bir Yana Dünya Bir Yana/İçiyorum"	
197?	Phillips	"Puerto Mondt/Der Große Abschied"	Published in Germany.
197?	Phillips	"(I Agapi M' Afise) Rain/(Alli Den Tha Vreis Opos Emena) Abracadabra"	Published in Greece.
197?	Phillips	"(Den Rotises Pote) Puerto Montt/(San To Karavi) Oh Danny Oh Danny"	Published in Greece.
1972	Phillips	"Ai No Omoide/Wasureenu Hito"	Published in Japan.
1972	İstanbul Plak; Kervan Plak	"Olanlar Oldu Bana/Çapkın Satıcı"	Included with a new arrangements in the album Cool Kadın.
1972	İstanbul Plak; Kervan Plak	"Dert Bende/Varsın Yansın Dünya"	"Dert Bende": lyrics by Orhan Gencebay. Dert Bende appears with a new arrangement in Ajda 96.
1973	İstanbul Plak; Kervan Plak	"Kaderimin Oyunu/Kimler Geldi Kimler Geçti"	"Kaderimin Oyunu": lyrics by Orhan Gencebay
1973	İstanbul Plak	"Babylone, Babyone/Viens Pleurer Dans Mon C'eur"	
1973	İstanbul Plak	"Tanrı Misafiri/İçme Sakın"	
1973	İstanbul Plak	"Seninleyim/Palavra Palavra"	"Palavra Palavra" is featured in the album The Best of Ajda.
1974	İstanbul Plak	"Nasılsın, İyi misin/İnanmam"	"İnanmam" is included in the album The Best of Ajda.
1974	İstanbul Plak	"Sana Neler Edeceğim/Haram Olsun Bu Aşk Sana"	"Sana Neler Edeceğim" later reappears in the album Diva and "Haram Olsun Bu Aşk Sana" is included in The Best of Ajda.
1975	İstanbul Plak	"Hoşgör Sen/Sana Ne, Kime Ne"	"Hoşgör Sen" later appears in the album The Best of Ajda.
1975	İstanbul Plak	"Al Beni/Aşk Budur"	
1976	Burç	"Ne Varsa Bende Var/Yere Bakan Yürek Yakan"	"Ne Varsa Bende Var" appears again in The Best of Ajda.
1976	Burç	"Je T'apprendrai L'amour/Tu Pars Et Tu Reviens"	
1976	Phillips	"Gözünaydın/Kim Ne Derse Desin"	"Gözünaydın/Kim Ne Derse Desin" reappears in the album The Best of Ajda.
1976	Phillips	"Mediterranée/Kim Derdi ki"	Published in France.
1977	Phillips	"Hancı/Mediterranée"	Published in Japan."Hancı" was later placed in the album Diva.
1977	Phillips	"Viens Dans Ma Vie/Face A Face Avec Moi"	"Viens Dans Ma Vie" sold ten thousand copies in the first three days of publishing, and in a very short time it reached above forty thousand sales. It is the best selling record in foreign language in Turkey.
1977	Phillips	"Ağlama Yarim/Sakın Sakın Ha"	
1977	Phillips	"A Mes Amours/Satisfaction"	Published in France and Japan.
1977	Phillips	"Mediterráneo/A Mes Amours"	Published in Spain.
1978	Phillips	"Ya Sonra?/Yeniden Başlasın"	
1978	Phillips	"Et Je Voyage/Je Danse"	Published in France. Pour Lui
1978	Phillips	"Loin De Nos Je T'aime/Combien Je T'aime"	Published in France. Pour Lui
1980	Phillips	"Pet'r Oil"	
1980	Phillips	"Pet'r Oil/Le Roi Du Petrole"	Published in Netherlands and France.
1980	Phillips	"Pet'r Oil/Loving on Petrol"	Published in Netherlands, France, Portugal and United Kingdom (Turkish and English versions)
1980	Türküola	"Petrol/Yeni Bir Dünya (Bir Dünya Ver Bana)"	
2003	NVN Müzik	"Sen İste"	
2009	DMC	"Resim"	
2012	DMC	"Ben Yanmışım"	From Ozan Çolakoğlu's album 01.
2013	DMC / GNL	"Ara Sıcak (feat. Ozan Çolakoğlu)"	
2014	DMC	"Gönül Sayfam"	From the album Kayahan'ın En İyileri No.1.
2015	DMC	"Yakarım Canını"	
2016	DMC	"Ayrılık Ateşi (feat. Volga Tamöz)"	
2017	DMC	"Peşindeyim" (with Mustafa Ceceli)	From Mustafa Ceceli's album Zincirimi Kırdı Aşk.
2017	DMC	"Düşman mısın Aşık mı? (feat. Bahadır Tatlıöz)"	
2019	DMC / DGL	"Yalnızlık Fm" (with Ozan Doğulu)	From Ozan Doğulu's album 130 BPM Kreşendo
2019	Erol Evgin Prodüksiyon	"İçimdeki Fırtına"	From Erol Evgin's album Altın Düetler 2.
2019	Ozinga & DMC	"Canın Sağ Olsun"	
2023	Coverz & DMC	"Aşklayalım"	
2026	Hypers Music	"Hileli"	With Manifest
2026	Poll Production	"Şahsen Ben"	

== Charts ==
List of singles, release date and album name
Single	Year	Peak	Album
Single	Year	TR	Album
"Vitrin"	2006	2	Cool Kadın
"Amazon"	2007	—	Cool Kadın
"Aynen Öyle"	2008	3	Aynen Öyle
"Flu Gibi"	2009	5	Aynen Öyle
"Resim"	2009	5	Resim
"Yakar Geçerim"	2011	2	Farkın Bu
"Arada Sırada"	2011	—	Farkın Bu
"Ara Sıcak" (feat. Ozan Çolakoğlu)	2013	3	Ara Sıcak
"Yakarım Canını"	2015	4	Yakarım Canını
"—" indicates that the songs were not included in the lists or the results were not disclosed.
