= Büyük Kabare =

- Music: Attila Özdemiroğlu
- Lyrics: Umur Bugay (play): Aysel Gürel; Fikret Şeneş (songs)
- Premiere: 6 August 1982: Open-Air Theatre

Büyük Kabare (Grand Cabaret) is a two-part musical performed by Turkish singer Ajda Pekkan and Turkish actors Metin Akpınar and Zeki Alasya for the first time in 1982. Beş Yıl Önce, On Yıl Sonra, Istanbul Developmental Orchestra, Asuman Arsan, Devekuşu Cabaret and USG Dance Group accompanied them on stage. The show went on stage for the first time at the Open-Air Theatre in Istanbul on 6 August 1982 and was held in different cities in the following periods.

== About ==
Büyük Kabare was co-produced by International Art Shows Inc. and Devekuşu Cabaret Theatre. The show started at the Open-Air Theatre in Istanbul on 6 August 1982, and continued for more than a year and toured several cities, including Ankara and İzmir. The tickets for the musical were sold out immediately in many cities, including the İzmir Fair where it sold 35,000 tickets over the course of a few days. O dönem birçok çeşitli müzikal ve tiyatro gösterileriyle Türkiye'de şöhretlerini artıran Devekuşu Cabaret, which had improved its reputation with various musical and theatrical performances in Turkey, was led by Metin Akpınar and Zeki Alasya. The cabaret started to cooperate with Ajda Pekkan for the musical. Pekkan, who was disappointed due to her poor performance in the Eurovision Song Contest 1980, came to the stage with this show for the first time after a 2.5-year break. Thus, for the first time, she appeared in a musical. Erol Dallı, a columnist who evaluated the musical in the Milliyet newspaper, said: "In this hasty cabaret, adorning the jokes with little swears and the disconnections between the episodes may not be appreciated by the audience. But still the Great Cabaret will attract a great number of viewers." Some of the songs Fikret Şeneş wrote for Ajda Pekkan for this musical were included in Pekkan's Süperstar '83 (1983) album.

== Cast and crew ==
- Ajda Pekkan - singer
- Metin Akpınar - actor
- Zeki Alasya - actor
- Beş Yıl Önce, On Yıl Sonra - music group
- Istanbul Developmental Orchestra - musical instruments
- Asuman Arsan - actor
- Devekuşu Cabaret - theatre group
- USG Dance Club - dancers
- Umur Bugar - writer
- Ergin Orbey - art consultant
- Attila Özdemiroğlu - music
- Aysel Gürel - lyrics
- Fikret Şeneş - lyrics
- Yıldırım Mayruk - costumes
- Zeynep Bostancı - costumes
- Altan Tekin - choreography
