= Ajda Pekkan =

Turkish singer (born 1946)

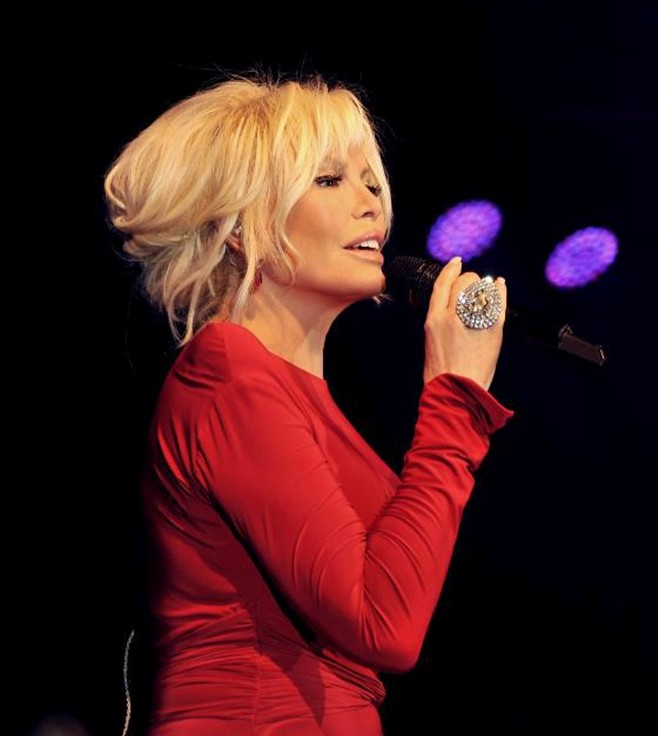
- Pekkan in 2013
- Born: Ayşe Ajda Pekkan; 12 February 1946 (age 80); Beyoğlu, Istanbul, Turkey
- Occupations: Singer; actress (formerly)
- Spouses: Coşkun Sapmaz (m. 1973; div. 1973) Ali Bars (m. 1984; div. 1990)
- Relatives: Semiramis Pekkan (sister)
- Musical career
- Genres: Pop; dance; schlager
- Instruments: Vocals; piano; keyboard
- Years active: 1963–present
- Labels: Serengil; Odeon; Regal; Philips; İstanbul; Kervan; Burç; Yaşar; Balet; Emre; Raks; Tempa & Foneks; Elenor; Universal; DMC; GNL
- Formerly of: Los Çatikos
- Website: www.ajdapekkan.com

Ayşe Ajda Pekkan (Turkish pronunciation: [aʒˈda pekˈkan]; born 12 February 1946) is a Turkish singer. She is known by the title "superstar" in the Turkish media.The queen of Turkish pop music. Pekkan became a prominent figure of Turkish pop music with her songs, which feature strong female figures. By keeping with the times and being influenced by Western elements, she managed to become one of Turkey's modern and enduring icons for over 50 years. Pekkan is highly respected in the music industry and has received praise from critics for both her vocal technique and her albums.In addition to Turkish, she has sung songs in French, English, German, Italian, Greek, and Japanese. She has albums recorded in these languages.She has duets with Demis Roussos, Gloria Gaynor, and Enrico Macias.

Born in Beyoğlu, Istanbul, Pekkan's musical career began in the early 1960s when she appeared in a nightclub as a member of the music group Los Çatikos. However in 1963 she became known as an actress as the lead in the film Adanalı Tayfur and won Ses magazine's cinema artist competition. Over the next six years, she starred in nearly 50 black and white films, including Şıpsevdi (1963), Hızır Dede (1964) and Şaka ile Karışık (1965). She eventually quit acting and focused entirely on her singing career.

Pekkan spent the first twenty years of her singing career focusing on releasing covers. These songs, which were generally written by Fikret Şeneş and included "Kimler Geldi Kimler Geçti", "Palavra Palavra", "Sana Neler Edeceğim", "Hoş Gör Sen", "Sana Ne Kime Ne", "Bambaşka Biri", "Uykusuz Her Gece" and "O Benim Dünyam", later took their place among the best known songs of both Pekkan's career and the Turkish pop music genre. From the 1990s onwards, she worked with various songwriters and arrangers, including Şehrazat and Sezen Aksu. During this period, many of her songs such as "Yaz Yaz Yaz", "Sarıl Bana", "Eğlen Güzelim", "Vitrin", "Aynen Öyle" and "Yakar Geçerim" ranked among the top songs on Turkey's music charts.

Her fame grew steadily throughout the 1970s outside her home country, and particularly in Europe (recording a French album in 1978), and she toured internationally. Due to her increasing popularity, Pekkan was viewed as a potential candidate to represent Turkey in the Eurovision Song Contest 1980 and she reluctantly accepted to participate in the contest. Disappointed that her song "Pet'r Oil" ranked fifteenth in the contest, she decided to take a break from her career for a few years.

Having sold over 15 million records, Ajda Pekkan is one of the best-selling artists of all time in Turkey. She also holds the title of "State Artist" in Turkey and has been awarded the honorary distinction of Officier of the Ordre des Arts et des Lettres by the French government. Three of her albums were included in the list of the Best 100 Albums of Turkey by Hürriyet newspaper. In 2016, Pekkan's name appeared in The Hollywood Reporter's Power 100, a list of the 100 most powerful women in entertainment. Although she does not self-identify as a feminist, many of her songs which tell the stories of powerful women were used as feminist anthems.

== Early life ==
Ajda Pekkan was born on 12 February 1946 in Istanbul. She is of Bosniak descent. Her father Rıdvan Pekkan was a commander in the Turkish Navy, and her mother Gülten Nevin Dobruca was a housewife. Pekkan and her family later moved to Gölcük, Kocaeli, due to her father's work. Pekkan, who always wanted to have a child, married for the first time in her 20s and as her husband wanted her to finish her career in music, she got divorced and later cited not having children as the greatest sacrifice she had made to continue her career. Sezen Aksu, who is a close friend of Pekkan, said about her influence on her: "She has opened this way to us, thanks to her I am here too. Ajda's nickname is Angela. We meet quite often at home. We do not have any hidden secrets. Where Ajda goes or what she eats, I also go there and eat the same thing."

== Career ==
=== 1960s ===
With the help of her sister Semiramis Pekkan, she met İlham Gencer, the owner of "Çatı" nightclub in 1961 and began her music career by singing Mina's song "Il Cielo In Una Stanza" With the help of "Los Çatikos" music community, she performed at a few places for a while. In 1963, at a singing and acting competition organized by Ses magazine named "Ses Sinema Artisti Yarışması", Pekkan ranked first in women's category followed by Hülya Koçyiğit. By winning the competition and with her modern style, she started to attract attention.

I am very happy with the Ajda Pekkan brand that I have brought up to this day. But that's because I stood behind it, if it weren't me it wouldn't have come to this place. Because there was no promotional system at the time. To create that system alone as a woman really requires courage, it's really hard.

— "Söz ve Müzik" documentary, 2014

Before starting her acting career, she met Fecri Ebcioğlu, who helped her through her music career and in 1965 arranged Pekkan's first record Her Yerde Kar Var, which is the Turkish version of the song Tombe la neige by Salvatore Adamo.

Throughout the 1960s, Pekkan and Ebcioğlu collaborated on numerous records, where Ebcioğlu would write the Turkish lyrics for popular French, Italian or English songs and Pekkan would sing them in her own unique style. In 1967, her record İki Yabancı, which is the Turkish version of the song Strangers in the Night by Frank Sinatra, broke the sales records in Turkey.

She represented Turkey at the International Apollonia Music Festival in Athens, where she performed the songs "Ozleyis" and "Perhaps One Day" in 1968 and 1969, respectively. She also represented Turkey in 1969 at the Mediterranean Song Festival in Barcelona, performing the song "Ve Ben Şimdi". Her songs have been used on the soundtracks of many films throughout the 1960s. She also began to perform with Zeki Müren.

=== 1970s onwards ===
By the beginning of the 1970s, she had stopped working with Fecri Ebcioğlu and started to work with Fikret Şeneş. Their first collaboration, Sensiz Yillarda, broke another sales record in Turkey. This song was released under the Philips label, which had signed her a year earlier. This was a turning point in Pekkan's career, when she started releasing records in countries outside Turkey. The first two 45 RPMs she released with Philips label, "Sensiz Yıllarda/Olmadı Gitti" and "Yağmur/Tek Yaşanır mı" were also recorded in Greek and released in Greece. Although, Philips records moved out of Turkey in 1971, Pekkan was signed with them until 1978 for business outside of Turkey. She would go on to release numerous records under Philips International label around the globe in the 1970s. This included her two 45RPMs in Germany and Spain, three 45RPMs in Japan, and seven 45RPMs in France. Her collaboration with Philips International would come to an end after she released her French Album, Pour Lui in 1978.

Pekkan, who switched to İstanbul Plak in 1972, broke yet another sales record with her 45 rpm, Dert Bende Derman Sende, which is an arabesque style song. In 1973, her producer Fikret Şeneş was very insistent on her recording the song "Kimler Geldi Kimler Geçti", although Pekkan thought that the song was not in her style. However, "Kimler Geldi Kimler Geçti" became a big hit in 1973 after it was featured on the B-side of the 45 rpm "Kaderimin Oyunu". It has been said by Nino Varon that the song "Kimler Geldi Kimler Geçti" is the most meaningful song ever written in Turkish.

Pekkan collected her songs from all previous records, except the one published by Istanbul Plak in 1972, and put them in her first compilation album Ajda, which was published in July 1975. A new song, "Erkek Adın", was also included in the album. Cüneyt Türel was featured on the song "Palavra Palavra" in this album.

Pekkan, who was known as "Superstar" by 1977, published her new album Süperstar with different cover designs and production. In the same year, she performed the song "A Mes Amours" at Yamaha Music Festival in Tokyo. Pekkan gave a concert in Tehran at that time and this concert was broadcast on television and well received by the Turkish audience.

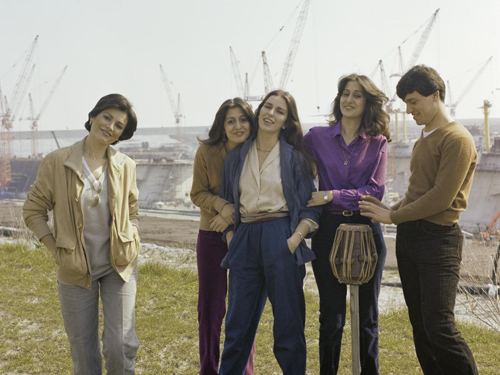
At the Eurovision Song Contest 1980, Ajda Pekkan (left) and her group represented Turkey.

Pekkan's increasing popularity outside her own country and in Europe, created a public desire for her to represent Turkey at the Eurovision Song Contest 1980 and fix the country's general image following its poor performances in previous years. She initially refused to participate in the competition as she found it "amateur", but eventually accepted the offer given to her by TRT. She took part in the contest with the song "Pet'r Oil" and finished 15th, which left her deeply disappointed; the ranking had a shocking effect not only on her, but also the circles who were sure she would get a high rating. After the contest Pekkan left Istanbul and lived in London and Los Angeles for months. During this period, she tried to overcome the psychological problems arising from the problems she experienced in her career and private life. In Los Angeles, she fell ill with jaundice and went through a two-month convalescence. It wasn't until July 1982 that she fully recovered and returned to Turkey.

After "Pet'r Oil", the singer ended her contract with Philips Records and signed a new one with Yaşar Kekeva Plak. She also put an end to her career outside Turkey and started to release songs only in Turkey. Complying with the arabesque music trend that rose in the country, in September 1981, she released the LP record Sen Mutlu Ol from this company. However, when she was not satisfied with the results, she did not want to work with the same company for a second album. Upon her reluctance to record the second record, she was legally challenged by Yaşar Kekeva. During this period, Kekeva released seven songs that were prepared for the previous record but not released in it. These songs were published under a new separate record titled Sevdim Seni (1982) without Pekkan's permission. Nevertheless, as per the contract, Pekkan owed three more songs to the company, and it was not legally possible for her to produce a new record or to negotiate with a new company until the completion of these songs. Finally, she went to the studio and recorded three new songs, and her album Sevdim Seni was edited and republished in March 1983, and her agreement with Yaşar Kekeva Plak ended.

In August 1982, Ajda Pekkan took the stage with Metin Akpınar and Zeki Alasya at the Istanbul Open-Air Theater with the musical Büyük Kabare, and came to the stage for the first time after approximately 2.5 years. In this musical, she collaborated again with Fikret Şeneş; Şeneş prepared six songs for the musical, including some of the songs that would later be included in Pekkan's next album. Pekkan's ninth studio album, Süperstar '83, was released in March 1983 by Balet Plak. The album topped Hey magazine's Local Pop Music/Foreign Pop Music chart for five weeks. It was promoted at the Şan Music Hall in Istanbul with the musical Süperstar Ajda '83. Various songs from this album, including "Uykusuz Her Gece", "Bir Günah Gibi", "Son Yolcu" and "Düşünme Hiç", became among Pekkan's and Turk pop music's best known songs. At the 1983 Music Oscars award ceremony organized by Hey magazine, the album received the Light Music LP of the Year award. Due to the album's success, at the 1984 Golden Butterfly Awards Pekkan was awarded as the Light Music Artist of the Year.

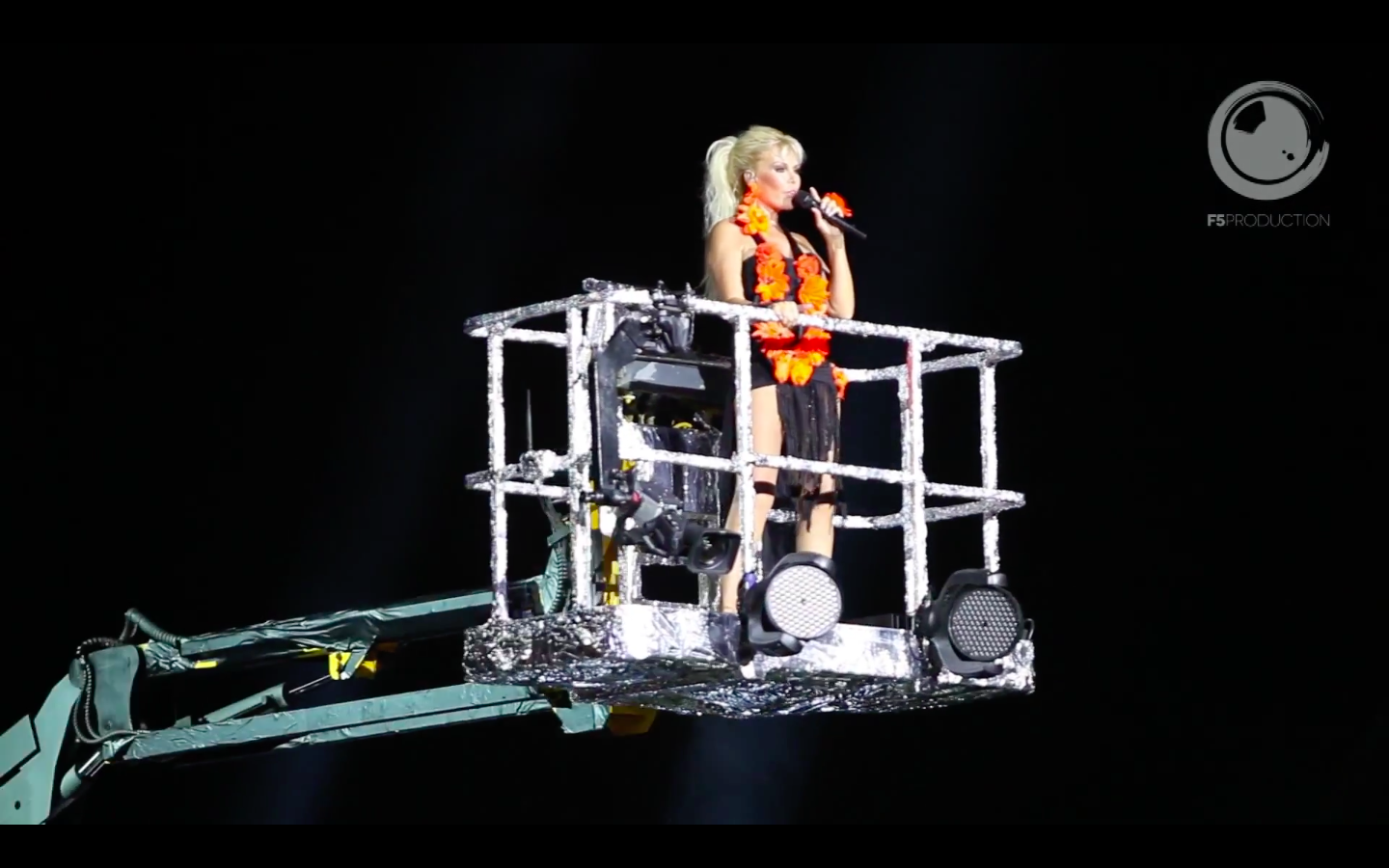
Pekkan sings on a winch crane at the Kuruçeşme Arena in July 2012

In 2002, Pekkan was cast in a leading role in the movie Şöhret Sandalı alongside Ediz Hun and Halil Ergün. The film, which was produced by Oya Demirtok and directed by Ayşe Ersayın, has not been released to this day.

In 2011, Pekkan released her single "Yakar Geçerim", written by Turkish singer Tarkan, which ranked second on Turkey's official music chart. A month later the single was followed by her album, Farkin Bu. The album ranked first on D&R's list of best-selling albums in Turkey and eventually sold 175,000 copies. In 2013 she released another single, "Ara Sıcak". The song was written by Turkish singer Gülşen and ranked third on the official music chart in Turkey. Pekkan continued her career by releasing singles "Yakarım Canını" (2015), "Ayrılık Ateşi" (2016), and "Canın Sağ Olsun" (2019), the first of which ranked fourth on Turkey's official chart.

In 2026, she released the single "Hileli" in collaboration with the Turkish girl group Manifest, known for their pop and dance‑oriented style.

== Image ==
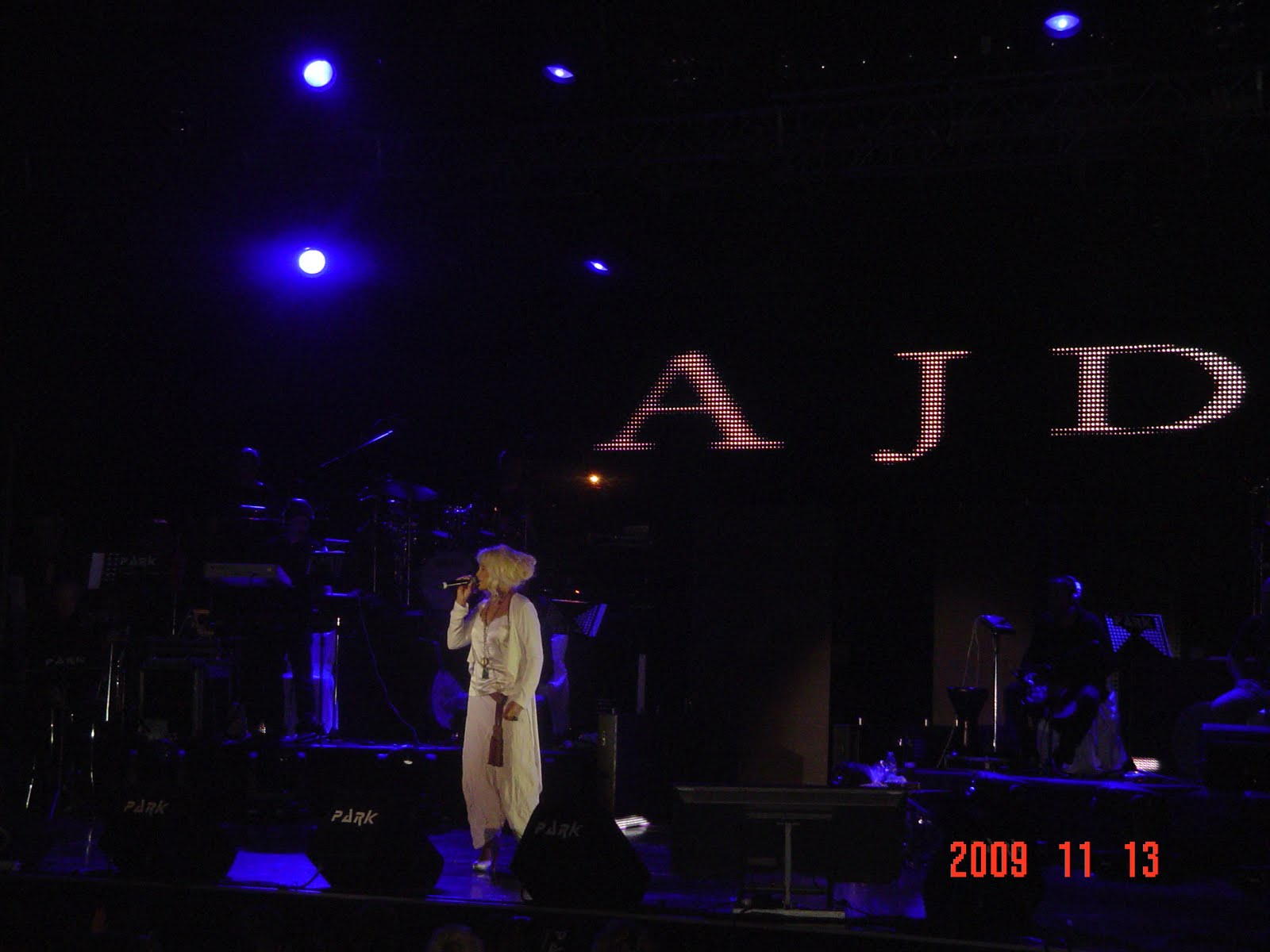
Pekkan performing at a concert in 2009

Pekkan, who appeared in many movies in the 1960s, was criticized by some men in the media for her new style and physique, and in the second year of her acting career she published a sensational article on the magazine Bikini, titled "I destroy the idols".

Pekkan, who had become known for her songs and new style, was also much talked about in the media due to her fashion sense. In an interview, she said: "How I have been seen until today, I continue to be like that in the future. As a soldier's daughter, I can not do anything that is different from my style." Naim Dilmener published a book titled Hür Doğdum Hür Yaşarım in 2007 about Ajda Pekkan's life and music career. Pekkan's views on feminism are included in her biography.

Pekkan is an activist for women and has spoken against issues such as domestic violence, abuse of women, illiteracy, discrimination, and has released a music video addressing the issue of "violence against women". In 2013, Hürriyet prepared a TV commercial about liberty for all, in which Pekkan performed the song "Hürriyet Benim" (Liberty is Mine).

In the album Güldünya Şarkıları, which various artists prepared for the purpose of helping the Domestic Violence Emergency Helpline, Pekkan performed the song "Kadın Dediğin", and together with Aynur Doğan, she promoted the album by performing the song "Keçe Kurdan", which had previously been banned by a court decision. Pekkan was the first artist to support the democratic initiative proposed by the 60th government of Turkey.

As a part of Güldünya Şarkıları's project, she visited Bakırköy Women's Prison, where she also met and comforted Deniz Seki who was being held in State custody.

Pekkan, who is a close friend of Sezen Aksu, is also known for her friendly relations with Nilüfer and Nükhet Duru. Sertab Erener, Funda Arar and Bengü are said to be her favorite artists. Like Hande Yener and İzel, Pekkan continues to release songs that are similar to her previous works in terms of style and arrangement.

Ajda Pekkan is considered a gay icon within Turkey's LGBT community. In a survey done by KAOS GL in 2007, she was chosen as the second most popular gay icon of Turkey.

Pekkan, who is a supporter of animal rights, participated in a meeting in February 2011 to meet Recep Tayyip Erdoğan and discuss issues surrounding animal rights. She has adopted and cared for a number of street animals, including a cat named Beyaz and a dog named Apple. On 7 May 2013, Pekkan visited the Grand National Assembly of Turkey and saw a discussion about animal rights which took place in the assembly.

In August 2011, together with Recep Tayyip Erdoğan and a group of artists, Pekkan visited Somalia. In October 2011, she gave a concert to help Somalians who had settled in Istanbul. In April 2018, she and a number of artists accompanied President Erdoğan on a visit to Hatay to meet soldiers who had participated in Operation Olive Branch.

During the 2020 Nagorno-Karabakh war between Armenia and Azerbaijan, Pekkan took to Instagram to post a map with Armenia erased from the map, alongside the Turkish and Azerbaijani flags.

== Personal life ==
On 17 November 1973, Pekkan married Coşkun Sapmaz. The marriage lasted for only 6 days. She was engaged for a second time in 1979 to journalist Erol Yaraş at the İzmir Fair. The couple's engagement rings were presented to them by Metin Akpınar and Zeki Alasya. In 1984, she married Ali Bars. The couple remained married for 6 years. Pekkan mentions her decision to not have children as her biggest regret. Six of her pregnancies ended in abortion as she wanted to focus on her career. Pekkan has performed in many places inside and outside Turkey, and in addition to Turkish, has sung in English, French, Italian, and Japanese.

Pekkan, who did not finish her education at Çamlıca Girls High School, started her music and acting career early and took singing lessons from Leyla Demiriş.

In 2017, Pekkan acquired citizenship from the Turkish Republic of Northern Cyprus.

== Discography ==
- Ajda Pekkan (1968)
- Fecri Ebcioğlu Sunar: Ajda Pekkan (1969)
- Ajda Pekkan Vol. 3 (1972)
- Ajda (1975)
- Süperstar (1977)
- Pour Lui (1978)
- Süperstar 2 (1979)
- Sen Mutlu Ol (1981)
- Sevdim Seni (1982)
- Süperstar '83 (1983)
- Ajda Pekkan ve Beş Yıl Önce On Yıl Sonra (1985)
- Süperstar 4 (1987)
- Ajda 1990 (1990)
- Seni Seçtim (1991)
- Ajda '93 (1993)
- Ajda Pekkan (1996)
- Cool Kadın (2006)
- Aynen Öyle (2008)
- Farkın Bu (2011)
- Ajda Pekkan & Muazzez Abacı (2014)
- Ajda (2021)

== Filmography ==
As an actress
| Year | Title | Role | Notes |
|---|---|---|---|
| 1963 | Adanalı Tayfur | Filiz | |
| 1963 | Şıpsevdi | Filiz | |
| 1963 | Kendini Arayan Adam | Gönül | |
| 1963 | Şaşkın Baba | | |
| 1963 | Öpüşmek Yasak | Sema Selamet | |
| 1964 | Abidik Gubidik | | |
| 1964 | Çanakkale Aslanları | | |
| 1964 | Plajda Sevişelim | Ressam Lale | |
| 1964 | Kaynana Zırıltısı | Fatma | |
| 1964 | Avare | | |
| 1964 | Hızır Dede | | |
| 1964 | Koçum Benim | | |
| 1964 | Sokakların Kanunu | Emine | |
| 1965 | Artık Düşman Değiliz | Alev | |
| 1965 | Cici Kızlar | Nermin Gürsoy Çiftbaş | |
| 1965 | Kart Horoz | Hizmetçi Fatoş | |
| 1965 | Kolla Kendini Bebek | | |
| 1965 | Pantolon Bankası | | |
| 1965 | Şaka ile Karışık | Ayla | |
| 1965 | Şepkemin Altındayım | | |
| 1965 | Yabancı Olduk Şimdi | | |
| 1965 | Bir Caniye Gönül Verdim | | |
| 1965 | Şehvetin Esiriyiz | Sevim | |
| 1965 | Babamız Evleniyor | Leyla | |
| 1965 | Sevdalı Kabadayı | | |
| 1965 | Taçsız Kral | Hülya | |
| 1965 | Dalgacı Mahmut | | |
| 1965 | Berduş Milyoner | | |
| 1965 | Helal Adanalı Celal | | |
| 1965 | Bir Gönül Oyunu | | |
| 1965 | Lafını Balla Kestim | | |
| 1965 | Sevinç Gözyaşları | Filiz Erkmen | |
| 1966 | Avare Kız | Ayla Doğanoğlu | |
| 1966 | Kara Tren | Türkân | |
| 1966 | Şoför Deyip Geçmeyin | | |
| 1966 | Seher Vakti | Ajda | |
| 1966 | Ümit Sokağı | | |
| 1966 | Düğün Gecesi | Güler | |
| 1966 | Siyah Otomobil | Selma | |
| 1966 | Dişi Düşman | İren | |
| 1966 | Dağda Silah Konuşur | | |
| 1966 | Günah Çocuğu | | |
| 1966 | Affet Sevgilim | Leyla | |
| 1966 | Ayrılık Şarkısı | | |
| 1966 | Erkek Severse | Serap | |
| 1967 | Harun Reşid'in Gözdesi | Dilaram | |
| | Düşman Âşıklar | Gonca | |
| 1968 | Kalbimdeki Yabancı | | . |
| 1969 | Tatlı Günler | | |
| 1969 | Hancı | | |
| 2002 | Şöhret Sandalı | Yelda | |
| 2013 | Romantik Komedi 2 | Herself (Guest) | |
| 2023 | Kızılcık Şerbeti | Herself (Guest) | |
| 2025 | Şampiyonlar | | Voiceover |
| 2026 | Tuzlu Kahve | Şerife (Guest) | |

== Awards and honors ==
Orders

| Ribbon | Award and order | Country | Date | City | Note | Source |
|---|---|---|---|---|---|---|
| | Art-Cultural and Human Artist Awards | Azerbaijan | 14 July 2013 | Baku | The award was given by the International Eurasian Institute, headed by Ganire Pashayeva. | |
| | Ordre des Arts et des Lettres | France | 1 November 2013 | Istanbul | The award was given by the French Ambassador to Turkey, Laurent Bili, on behalf of the French Minister of Culture, Aurélie Filippetti. | |

Other

- 2013: "All Time Unchanging Brand Award", Ankara

== See also ==
- Honorific nicknames in popular music
- List of Turkish musicians

Awards and achievements
| Preceded by Nilüfer & Nazar with "Sevince" | Turkey in the Eurovision Song Contest; 1980 | Succeeded by Ayşegül Aldinç & Modern Folk Trio with "Dönme Dolap" |
