= Manifestival =

Studio album by Manifest
- Released: June 13, 2025
- Length: 26:08
- Language: Turkish
- Label: Hypers New Media

Manifestival is the debut studio album by Turkish music group Manifest. It was released on June 13, 2025, through Hypers New Media.

The album consists of 11 tracks incorporating elements of pop, electronic, R&B, and alternative genres. Members of the group contributed both vocally and in the lyric writing process to the album.

== Background and release ==
The preparation process for Manifestival began in late 2024. The promotion started with the release of the first single, "Zamansızdık", on February 7, 2025.

Prior to the album's release, it was supported by singles released in order: "Arıyo" (April 11), "KTS" (May 16), and "Snap" (May 30). Along with the release of the album, a short promotional film titled "Bi' Hayal İşte" was also shared.

== Commercial performance ==
Upon release, Manifestival appeared on Spotify Turkey’s “Top Songs” chart with all tracks within the first 24 hours. “Yaşanacaksa” ranked second and “Snap” ranked third on Spotify. The songs also entered the top 5 on YouTube Music Trending. On its release day, the album achieved 4 million streams on Spotify and 5 million views on YouTube, totaling 9 million listens/views.

One month after its release, the album also attracted attention from global media. It was included in Genius’s “Top 25 Albums of 2025 (So Far)” list.

The album also made it onto the Apple Music Top Albums lists in Turkey, Germany, Austria, Azerbaijan, Belgium, Bulgaria, Bahrain, the United Arab Emirates, Denmark, Georgia, Greece, Hungary, Ireland, Kazakhstan, Lebanon, Sri Lanka, Lithuania, Morocco, Moldova, Montenegro, the Netherlands, Portugal, Qatar, Serbia, Saudi Arabia, Switzerland, Uganda, Kosovo, and Costa Rica.

== Festival ==
As part of the album’s promotion, a festival titled “Manifestival” was held in Istanbul on June 28–29, 2025, bringing the group together with their fans. Tickets sold out shortly after release, prompting additional dates due to high demand.

== Track listing ==
No.	Title	Length
1.	"Intro"	1:10
2.	"Snap"	2:57
3.	"KTS"	2:46
4.	"Arıyo"	2:23
5.	"Manifest"	2:55
6.	"Zehir"	3:03
7.	"Hayır"	2:16
8.	"Zamansızdık"	2:56
9.	"Yaşanacaksa"	2:58
10.	"Durma"	3:11
11.	"Outro"	1:31
Total length:		26:08
