= Fikret Şeneş =

Turkish singer (b. 1921, d. 2015)

- Born: 1921; Ottoman Empire
- Died: 16 February 2015 (aged 93–94); Istanbul, Turkey
- Spouse: Bedii Çapa
- Children: 2

Fatma Fikret Şeneş (1921 – 16 February 2015) was the first Turkish female songwriter. By writing over 290 songs, she hugely contributed to the Turkish pop music. Her songs attracted great interest.

== Career ==
In the mid-1950s, Fikret Şeneş, who was in her early 30s, wrote her first lyrics for Erol Büyükburç, took vocal lessons and played the piano. In the late 1960s, "İki Yabancı" became the first Turkish song written by Şeneş. She then wrote hundreds of songs for popular artists in Turkey.

== Personal life ==
Fikret Şeneş's mother, Calibe, together with her husband chose their surname Şeneş as the Surname Law was enforced in Turkey. After graduating from the American College for Girls in Istanbul, Fikret Şeneş enrolled in the singing department of the conservatory and left without finishing the conservatory. She was married to Bedii Bey for 18 years.

Şeneş who was treated for Alzheimer's disease died on 16 February 2015. Şenes's body was buried at the Zincirlikuyu Cemetery.

== Songs ==
Song	First performed by	Album	Year	Lyrics	Music	Notes
Sensiz Yıllarda	Ajda Pekkan	45rpm	1970	Fikret Şeneş	Cacho Valdez	
Kimler Geldi Kimler Geçti	Ajda Pekkan	45rpm	1973	Fikret Şeneş	Tony Hatch	
Palavra Palavra	Ajda Pekkan	45rpm	1973	Fikret Şeneş	Giovanni Ferrio	
Ben Varım	Ayten Alpman		1974	Fikret Şeneş		
Sana Neler Edeceğim	Ajda Pekkan	Ajda	1975	Fikret Şeneş	Elias Rahbani	
İki Yabancı	Ajda Pekkan	Bang Bang-İki Yabancı	1967	Fikret Şeneş	Sonny Bono	
Anlamazdın	Ayla Dikmen	Anlamazdın	1975	Fikret Şeneş	Fikret Şeneş	
Bak Şu Adama Aşık Oldu	Ayla Algan	Bak Şu Adama Aşık Oldu-Versin Tanrı İstemeden	1976	Fikret Şeneş	Fikret Şeneş	
Baksana Talihe	Ajda Pekkan	Süperstar	1977	Fikret Şeneş	Bolivya Halk Ezgisi	
Kaybolan Yıllar	Sezen Aksu	Kaybolan Yıllar	1977	Fikret Şeneş	Fikret Şeneş	
Anlamadım Gitti	Ajda Pekkan	Süperstar	1977	Fikret Şeneş	W.Law	
Veda Etmem	Ajda Pekkan	Süperstar	1977	Fikret Şeneş	Jose Feliciano	
Dile Kolay	Ajda Pekkan	Süperstar 2 (33 rpm)	1979	Fikret Şeneş	Faramarz Aslani	
Haykıracak Nefesim	Ajda Pekkan	Süperstar 2 (33 rpm)	1979	Fikret Şeneş	J.Pierre Lang	
Bambaşka Biri	Ajda Pekkan	Süperstar 2 (33 rpm)	1979	Fikret Şeneş	Freddie Perren	
Yeniden Başlasın	Ajda Pekkan	Süperstar 2 (33 rpm)	1979	Fikret Şeneş	Gianni Belfiore	
Bir Günah Gibi	Ajda Pekkan	Süperstar '83	1983	Fikret Şeneş	Russian Folk Tune	
Son Yolcu	Ajda Pekkan	Süperstar '83	1983	Fikret Şeneş	Osvaldo Miccike	
Uykusuz Her Gece	Ajda Pekkan	Süperstar '83	1983	Fikret Şeneş	Fikret Şeneş	
Kimler Geldi Kimler Geçti	Ajda Pekkan	Kimler Geldi Kimler Geçti	1973	Fikret Şeneş	Fikret Şeneş	
Versin Tanrı İstemeden	Ayla Algan	Bak Şu Adama Aşık Oldu-Versin Tanrı İstemeden	1976	Fikret Şeneş	Fikret Şeneş	
Yolcu Yolunda Gerek	Nilüfer	Esmer Günler	1988	Fikret Şeneş	Fikret Şeneş	
Bir Zaman Hatası	Aşkın Nur Yengi	Sıramı Bekliyorum	1993	Fikret Şeneş	Doug Camerone	
