= Ajda 1990 =

Studio album by Ajda Pekkan
- Released: 14 April 1990 (Turkey)
- Recorded: Emre Plak
- Genre: Pop
- Length: 50:29
- Label: Emre Grafson Müzik
- Producer: Hüseyin Emre

Ajda Pekkan chronology
Unutulmayanlar (1990)	Ajda 1990 (1990)	Seni Seçtim (1991)

Singles from Ajda 90
- 1. "Yaz Yaz Yaz" Released: 1989; 2. "Her Yaşın Bir Güzelliği Var" Released: 1990

Ajda 1990 is Turkish pop singer Ajda Pekkan's twelfth studio album, which was released on 14 April 1990 in Turkey. The album was released in France and Turkey, thus the combination of French and Turkish titles. Half the songs are original Turkish compositions written especially for the album, while half are cover versions.

== Track listing ==
No.	Title	Writer(s)	Composer (s)	Length
1.	"Yaz Yaz Yaz"	Şehrazat	Garo Mafyan	4:13
2.	"Yazık Olur"	Şehrazat	Garo Mafyan	4:54
3.	"Hayırdır İnşallah"	Metin Özülkü	Garo Mafyan	3:57
4.	"Her Yaşın Bir Güzelliği Var"	Fikret Şenes	Garo Mafyan	5:14
5.	"Ne Günler (Il Y A Des Jours Comme Ça)"	Fikret Şeneş	Alain Nacash	4:21
6.	"Sana Bana Yeter (Le Vent Du Sud)"	Fikret Şeneş	Didier Barbelivien · Claude Morgan	3:45
7.	"Resmin Yok Bende"	Fikret Şeneş · Aysel Gürel	Selçuk Başar	3:31
8.	"Bir Yabancı Gibi (Il Venait D'avoir 18 Ans)"	Fikret Şenes	Paul Mauriat	4:11
9.	"Yaşanası Dünya (Que Si Que No)"	Fikret Şeneş	Linda De Suza	3:06
10.	"Dinlemelisin Beni"	Fikret Şeneş	Selçuk Başar	3:41
11.	"Bana Dönme Bir Daha"	Fuat Güner	Garo Mafyan	3:21
12.	"Doğru mu Değil mi"	Fikret Şeneş	Garo Mafyan	3:40
13.	"Olur Ya (Logia)"	Fikret Şeneş	Giannis Christodoulopoulos	2:35
Total length:				50:29

== Personnel ==
- Ajda Pekkan: Vocals
- Jeyan Erpi, Özkan Uğur, Cihan Okan, Sevingül Bahadır, Neco, Sertab Altın, Atilla Atasoy: Vocals
- Fuat Güner: Electric Guitars, Vocals
- Garo Mafyan: Keyboards
- Selçuk Başar: Keyboards, Guitars, MIDI Controlled Guitar
- Uğur Başar: Bass
- Seyhun Çelik: Goblet Drum
- Atilla Yılmaz: Bouzouki
- Halil Karaduman: Kanun (a large zither used especially in the Middle East)
