= Cool Kadın =

Studio album by Ajda Pekkan
- Released: 2 June 2006
- Recorded: DMC
- Genre: Pop
- Length: 52:47
- Label: MOD Yapım
- Producer: Yaşar Gaga

Ajda Pekkan chronology
Sen İste (2003)	Cool Kadın (2006)	Aynen Öyle (2008)

Singles from Cool Kadın
- 1. "Vitrin" Released: 2005; 2. "Amazon" Released: 2006

Cool Kadın is Turkish pop singer Ajda Pekkan's sixteenth studio album, which was released on 2 June 2006 in Turkey. The album was certified "Gold" by selling over 100 thousand copies.

== Track listing ==
No.	Title	Writer(s)	Composer (s)	Length
1.	"Cool Kadın"	Sezen Aksu	Can Algeç	5:10
2.	"Vitrin"	Sezen Aksu	Can Algeç	5:12
3.	"Yok Ki"	Sezen Aksu	Sezen Aksu	4:13
4.	"Sevdalı Başım"	Zülfü Livaneli	Zülfü Livaneli	3:49
5.	"Mucize"	Tuna Kiremitçi	Tuna Kiremitçi	3:41
6.	"Senden Sonra Tufan"	Sezen Aksu	Bülent Özdemir	4:33
7.	"Spente Le Stelle"	Jean Patrick Emerson	Vic Di Murta	4:40
8.	"Aldatma (Ancora Ancora Ancora)"	Sezen Aksu	Cristiano Malgioglio · Gian Pietro Felisatti	5:04
9.	"Amazon"	Tuna Kiremitçi	Tuna Kiremitçi	4:46
10.	"Kaderimin Oyunu"	Orhan Gencebay	Orhan Gencebay	4:50
11.	"Olanlar Oldu Bana"	Fikret Şeneş	Esma Redžepova	4:23
12.	"Senden Sonra Tufan (Version 2)"	Sezen Aksu	Bülent Özdemir	4:26
Total length:				52:47
