= Pour Lui (Ajda Pekkan album) =

Studio album by Ajda Pekkan
- Released: 17 December 1978
- Recorded: Philips
- Studio: Trident Studios
- Genre: Pop, Disco
- Length: 36:51
- Label: Philips
- Producer: Alec R. Costandinos, Jeff Barnel, Michel Jouveaux

Ajda Pekkan chronology
Superstar (1977)	Pour Lui (1978)	Superstar II (1979)

Singles from Ajda 90
- 1. "Combien Je T'aime" Released: 1978; 2. "Loin De Nos Je T'aime" Released: 1979

Pour Lui (Turkish: O'nun için) is Turkish pop singer Ajda Pekkan's fifth studio album, which was released on 17 December 1978 in Turkey. The album was published in France and Turkey as well as in Israel. Three songs are cover versions of Love & Kisses (Track 1 You're The Most Precious Thing In My Life and Track 11 Maybe) and Nicole Croisille (Track 9 En Oubliant Qu'On Était Deux) and one song has been covered by Demis Roussos (Track 7 Si J'Étais Magicien). There are lyricists and composers such as Michel Jouveaux, Jeff Barnel and Danielle Vézolles, whom were among the leading names in French music at the time.

== Track listing ==
No.	Title	Writer(s)	Composer (s)	Length
1.	"Combien Je T'aime"	Michel Jouveaux	Alec R. Costandinos	3:44
2.	"Je Danse"	Michel Jouveaux	Jeff Barnel	3:01
3.	"Loin De Nos Je T'aime"	Danielle Vézolles	Jeff Barnel	2:55
4.	"Un Amour Qui S'en Va"	Danielle Vézolles	Alec R. Costandinos	3:42
5.	"Et Je Voyage"	Danielle Vézolles	Jeff Barnel	2:51
6.	"Le Jardin D'Orient"	Didier Barbelivien	Gérard Stern	2:47
7.	"Si J'étais Magicien"	Michel Jouveaux	Jeff Barnel	3:36
8.	"Laisse-Moi Des Souvenirs"	Michel Jouveaux	Jeff Barnel	3:06
9.	"En Oubliant Qu'on Était Deux"	Boris Bergman	Jeff Barnel	3:08
10.	"Mon Cœur Est Comme Ça"	Danielle Vézolles	Jeff Barnel	3:15
11.	"Pour Lui"	Michel Jouveaux	Alec R. Costandinos	4:26
Total length:				36:51
