= Manifest (band) =

Turkish girl group

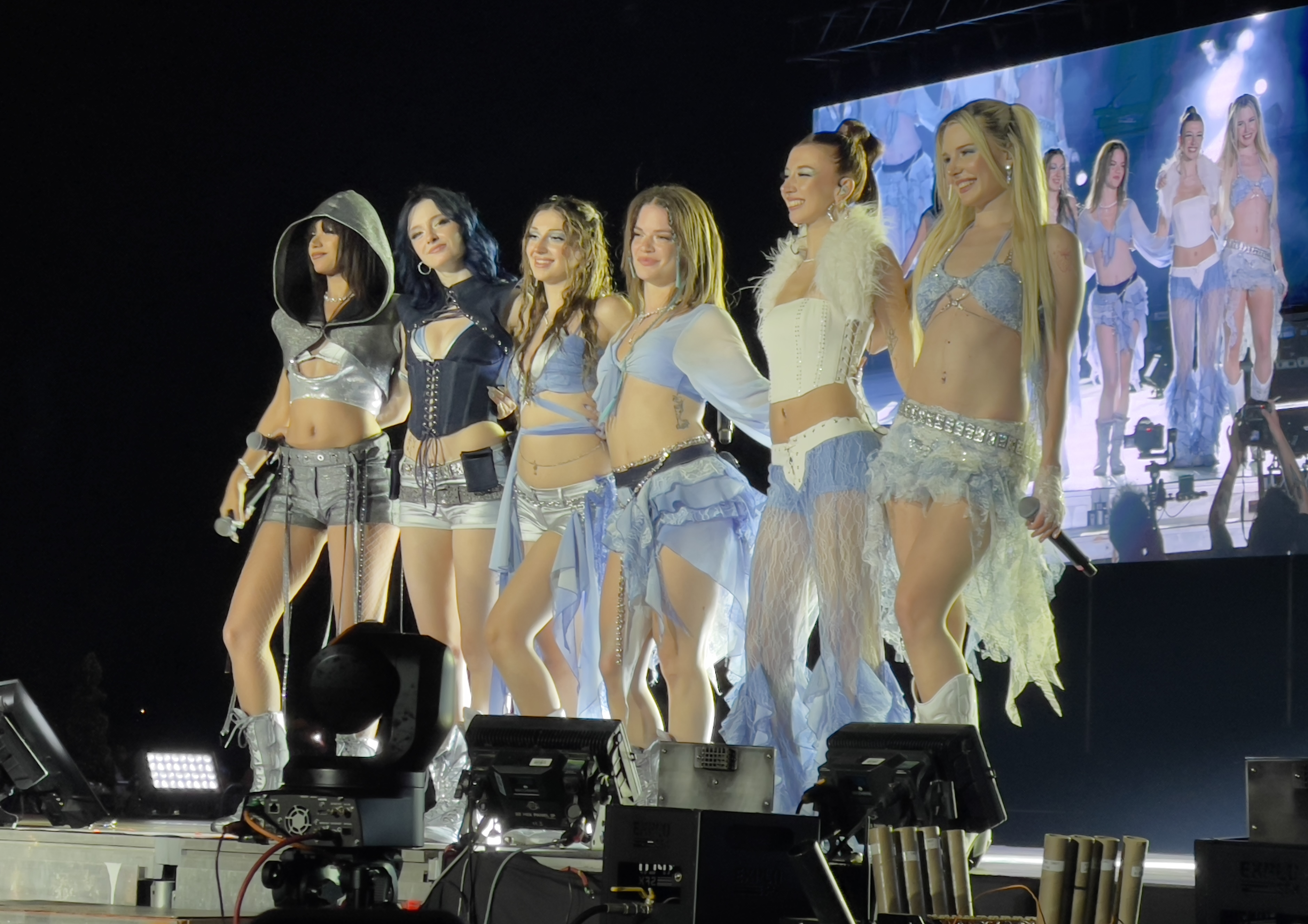
- Manifest in 2026. L–R: Hilal, Zeynep, Sueda, Esin, Mina, Lidya

Background information
- Origin: Istanbul, Turkey
- Genres: Pop; dance; R&B
- Years active: 2025–present
- Labels: Hypers New Media; Gullakh
- Members: Esin Bahat; Hilal Yelekçi; Lidya Pınar; Mina Solak; Sueda Uluca; Zeynep Sude Oktay

Manifest is a Turkish girl group formed by the talent agency Hypers New Media in 2025. It consists of Esin Bahat, Hilal Yelekçi, Lidya Pınar, Mina Solak, Sueda Uluca, and Zeynep Sude Oktay, and they play a mix of pop, dance, and R&B.

== History ==
In 2025, the six members of what would become Manifest—Esin Bahat, Hilal Yelekçi, Lidya Pınar, Mina Solak, Sueda Uluca, and Zeynep Sude Oktay—were all winners on the singing competition reality show Big5 Türkiye, organized by the talent agency Hypers New Media. Among the selection jury was singer Gülçin Ergül, formerly of the girl group Hepsi. They subsequently underwent six months of training in singing and K-pop-style choreography.

Their debut single, "Zamansızdık", was released in February 2025 and accumulated over 12 million streams within a few months. They held their first concert the same month, at the Jolly Joker Arena in Istanbul, and were joined onstage by Ergül. The group subsequently appeared on the March 2025 cover of Cosmopolitan Türkiye magazine. Their second single, "Arıyo", came out in April; it was followed by "KTS (Kalbimin Tek Sahibi)" and "Snap", both in May.

In April, Manifest announced their first album, Manifestival, which was released in June and debuted at number one on the charts in Turkey and Azerbaijan. To support the release, they hosted a two‑day festival in Istanbul on 28–29 June, selling approximately 25,000 tickets, and followed it with a tour.

In September, a deluxe edition of Manifestival was released, containing collaborations with Arem & Arman, Zeki Arkun, Motive, and fellow Big5 competitor Aydeed. In October, Manifest issued the single "Rüya". In December, they released the single "Amatör". In February 2026, the single "Başrol Sensin (1. Yıl Özel)" came out. In April 2026, the single "Daha İyi" came out.

In 2026, the group released the single "Hileli" in collaboration with the Turkish singer Ajda Pekkan. In July the single "Toz Pembe" came out. Later that month, Manifest released "pVg (Manifest Live Remix)", a track featuring the rapper Motive and the producer Pango.

In 2026, Manifest performed at Sunny Hill Festival in Pristina, Kosovo.

=== September 2025 investigation ===
Following a 6 September performance at Istanbul's KüçükÇiftlik Park, Turkey's public prosecutor's office launched an investigation into the group for "indecent and immoral acts" and "exhibitionism". After being interrogated, the group issued a statement, wherein they took responsibility for their performance and stated that it had not been their intention to hurt anyone. In a post on X, they announced that a sold-out tour of Turkey had been cancelled.

On 6 October, the group was issued an indictment, which stated that their dance performances were deemed to have "harmed public morals, decency, and modesty" and to have "negatively affected children and young people". Prison sentences ranging from six months to one year were sought for the group members and for the guest performer Ayça Dalaklı, known professionally as Aydeed.

The Istanbul 49th Criminal Court of First Instance sentenced each group member and Aydeed to three months and twenty-two days of imprisonment. The court later ruled for the suspension of the verdict for all defendants and lifted the previously imposed judicial control measure banning them from leaving the country.

== Band members ==
- Sueda Uluca – main vocalist
- Hilal Yelekçi – lead dancer
- Lidya Pınar – lead vocalist
- Mina Solak – sub-vocalist
- Zeynep Sude Oktay – sub-vocalist
- Esin Bahat – main dancer

== Discography ==
=== Studio albums ===
Title	Details
Manifestival	Release date: 13 June 2025; Label: Hypers Music; Format: CD, digital download, streaming

=== Singles ===
Title	Year	Peak chart positions			Album
Title	Year	TUR	TUR Radio	WW	Album
"Zamansızdık"	2025	—	—	—	Manifestival
"Arıyo"	2025	—	—	—	Manifestival
"KTS"	2025	8	—	—	Manifestival
"Snap"	2025	5	—	—	Manifestival
"Manifest"	2025	—	—	—	Manifestival
"Yaşanacaksa"	2025	2	3	—	Manifestival
"Rüya"	2025	5	9	—	Non-album singles
"Amatör" (English version titled "Amateur")	2025	5	4	—	Non-album singles
"Başrol Sensin (1. Yıl Özel)"	2026	4	5	—	Non-album singles
"Manifest (Arem & Arman Remix)"	2026	—	—	—	Non-album singles
"Zehir (Arem & Arman Remix)"	2026	—	—	—	Non-album singles
"Daha İyi"	2026	1	10	—	Non-album singles
"Hileli" (featuring Ajda Pekkan)	2026	1	1	—	Non-album singles
"Toz Pembe"	2026	1	3	—	Non-album singles
"pVg (Manifest Live Remix)" (featuring Motive and Pango)	2026	2	—	—	Non-album singles
"Tralala"	2026	1	—	121	Non-album singles
"–" denotes a recording that did not chart or was not released in that territory.

=== Other charted songs ===
Title	Year	Peak chart positions	Album
Title	Year	TUR	Album
"Zehir"	2025	16	Manifestival
