= İlham Gencer =

Turkish musician (1922–2023)

Bozkurt İlham Gencer
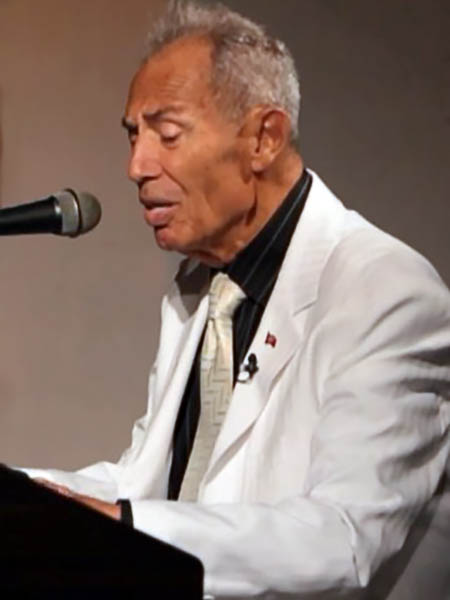
- Gencer in 2012
- Born: İlham Osman Gencer; 30 August 1922; Istanbul, Turkey
- Died: 24 May 2023 (aged 100); Bodrum, Muğla, Turkey
- Occupation: Musician

Bozkurt İlham Gencer (30 August 1922 – 24 May 2023) was a Turkish jazz pianist, singer and composer.

== Life and career ==
A child prodigy, İlham started playing piano as a child under the guidance of his mother, and never received any formal musical training. He held his first concert and made his first composition İlham Vals when he was 5 years old. He started his professional career in 1944, and between 1949 and 1963 he hosted several musical programs on Radio Istanbul.

In 1960 İlham opened a popular night club in the Istanbul district of Şişli, the Çatı Club, where he contributed to launch the careers of several singers and musicians. His 1961 song "Bak Bir Varmış Bir Yokmuş", a cover of Bob Azzam's "C'est écrit dans le Ciel", is regarded as the first pop song recorded in Turkish language.

In 2018, he was the subject of a biography, Bozkurt İlhami Gencer'le Sanat ve Siyaset Bir Bir Birada ("Art and politics at the same time with Bozkurt İlhami Gencer") written by Sami Coşkun.

=== Personal life ===
Between 1953 and 1960 İlham was married to singer Ayten Alpman, with whom he had two children. He later remarried to a woman named Necla, with whom he had a son, Bora, who is also a musician.
