= Süperstar '83 =

Studio album by Ajda Pekkan
- Released: 19 March 1983
- Recorded: 1982–83
- Studios: Gelişim Studios (Istanbul, Turkey)
- Genre: Pop
- Length: 35:07
- Label: Balet
- Producer: Yeşil Giresunlu

Ajda Pekkan chronology
| Sevdim Seni (1982) | Süperstar '83 (1983) | Ajda Pekkan ve Beş Yıl Önce On Yıl Sonra (1984) |

Süperstar '83 is the ninth studio album by Turkish singer Ajda Pekkan. It was released on 19 March 1983 by Balet Plak. With the release of the albums Süperstar (1977) and Süperstar 2 (1979) in the decade before, Pekkan succeeded in getting critical acclaim, however, following her poor results on the Eurovision Song Contest 1980 she stayed away from the music market for a while. Meanwhile, she released two records under the Yaşar Kekeva Plak label, but experienced various problems with the company. While Pekkan's disagreements with the company continued, in August 1982 she joined the musical Büyük Kabare with Metin Akpınar and Zeki Alasya. Some of the songs from this show, which were written by Fikret Şeneş, appeared in the third installment of the Süperstar album series.

Süperstar '83, which is almost entirely composed of cover songs, is a pop record in general, but it has jazz, disco and occasional oriental effects. The songs of American singers Amii Stewart and Donna Summer, and Italian singers Mia Martini and Mina, were included in the album with new arrangements, and some of these artists also influenced Pekkan's musical style. Şeneş, who wrote all the lyrics alone, worked on the theme of love by drawing a strong female figure and combining it with emotions such as deceit, impossibility and arrogance. Eight of the tracks were performed by Pekkan for the first time in this album, while the other two were songs performed by other Turkish singers in different albums in the previous years.

Instead of preparing a typical black phonograph record, the album was released on translucent phonograph records, becoming the first of its own in Turkey. As a result, the popularity of this type of phonograph records increased at the Unkapanı Recorders Market. The main part of the album's promotions occurred through the musical Süperstar Ajda '83. Additionally, Pekkan further promoted the songs by appearing on various programs on TRT and organizing concerts in different cities across Turkey. Aside from the popular songs "Uykusuz Her Gece" and "Bir Günah Gibi", the music videos made for the songs "Son Yolcu" and "Düşünme Hiç" were broadcast on television. These pieces continued to be popular for decades and became among the most famous works of Pekkan.

Music critics praised this album, which was described as one of the best among Pekkan's releases, and her decision to make an album consisting of famous cover songs after a period of depression in her career was welcomed by most commentators. At the 1983 Music Oscars award ceremony organized by Hey magazine, Pekkan was awarded as the Female Singer of the Year, while the album received the Light Music LP of the Year award. The magazine also chose "Uykusuz Her Gece" and "Bir Günah Gibi" as the second and third best songs of the year respectively. At the 1984 Golden Butterfly Awards, Pekkan won the Light Music Artist of the Year award. In 2010s, Hürriyet ranked the album 27th on its list of the best Turkish albums of all time.

== Background and development ==
In 1970s, Ajda Pekkan improved her career with her critically acclaimed works and gained reputation by performing songs both in her own language and in French, and organized events such as the Paris Olympia concert which made her known in other countries. In the second half of the decade, she started working with songwriter Fikret Şeneş, who played an important role in preparing the albums Süperstar (1977) and Süperstar 2 (1979). As a result, Pekkan launched a series of four LP records titled Süperstar. From these two albums songs such as "Baksana Talihe", "Bambaşka Biri", "Haykıracak Nefesim Kalmasa Bile" and "Ya Sonra" were popular hits and later became among the most praised of Pekkan's songs. These albums were also released in a period during which Pekkan published cover songs that were usually famous foreign compositions with Turkish lyrics by Fikret Şeneş. The name "Superstar", which was chosen as the title of the series and later became a nickname of Pekkan's, was first used by Hürriyet newspaper's then-boss Erol Simavi, who praised the singer's success in gaining fame outside Turkey and said, "It is not enough to call Ajda Pekkan a star, but we can do her justice by calling her a superstar."

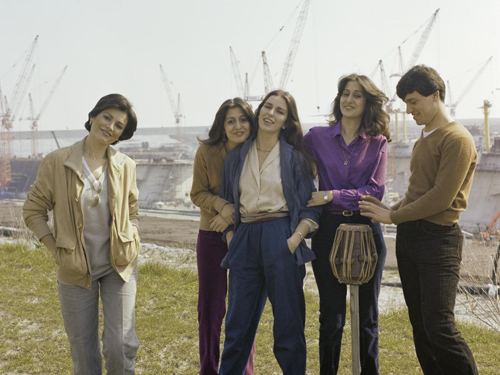
At the Eurovision Song Contest 1980, Ajda Pekkan (left) and her group represented Turkey. Pekkan's disappointment following her failure in the competition caused her to decrease her visibility in the market for the next few years.

Pekkan's increasing popularity outside her own country and in Europe, created a public desire for her to represent Turkey at the Eurovision Song Contest 1980 and fix the country's general image following its poor performances in the contest in the previous years. Although she initially refused to participate in the competition as she found it "amateur", she finally accepted the offer given to her by TRT. She took part in the contest with the song "Pet'r Oil" and finished 15th, which left her deeply disappointed; the ranking had a shocking effect not only for herself, but also for the circles who were sure she would get a high rating. After the contest Pekkan left Istanbul and lived in London and Los Angeles for months. During this period, she tried to overcome the psychological problems arising from the problems she experienced in her career and private life. In Los Angeles, she fell ill with jaundice and went through a two-month convalescence. It wasn't until July 1982 that she fully recovered and returned to Turkey.

After "Pet'r Oil", the singer ended her contract with Philips Records and signed a new one with Yaşar Kekeva Plak. She also put an end to her career outside Turkey and started to release songs only in Turkey. Complying with the arabesque music trend that rose in the country, in September 1981, she released the LP record Sen Mutlu Ol from this company. However, when she was not satisfied with the results, she did not want to work with the same company for a second album. Upon her reluctance to record the second record, she was legally challenged by Yaşar Kekeva. During this period, Kekeva released seven songs that were prepared for the previous record but not released in it. These songs were published under a new separate record titled Sevdim Seni (1982) without Pekkan's permission. Nevertheless, as per the contract, Pekkan owed three more songs to the company, and it was not legally possible for her to produce a new record or to negotiate with a new company until the completion of these songs. Finally, she went to the studio and recorded three new songs, and her album Sevdim Seni was edited and republished in March 1983, and her agreement with Yaşar Kekeva Plak ended.

In August 1982, Ajda Pekkan took the stage with Metin Akpınar and Zeki Alasya at the Istanbul Open-Air Theater with the musical Büyük Kabare, and came to the stage for the first time after approximately 2.5 years. In this musical, she collaborated again with Fikret Şeneş. Şeneş prepared six songs for the musical, including "Sen ve Ben", "Düşünme Hiç" and "Sihirli Aşk", which were later included in the album. In the meantime, rumors were circulating that some of the songs from the musical were to be included in the third installment of the Süperstar album series, which was to be produced by Balet Plak company's owner Yeşil Giresunlu. As a result, Pekkan put an end to releasing albums under the label Yaşar Kekeva Plak and began working on a number of new cover songs. Pekkan, who was busy with the musical at the time, shifted her focus to recording the songs for her new LP records. After republishing the album Sevdim Seni with new songs, there was no obstacle left for her to release her upcoming record under a new label. In March 1983, as she announced the production of a new musical titled Süperstar Ajda '83, Gündüz Tuna from Milliyet stated that the preparations for Pekkan's new LP record were continuing and it could be released at any time.

== Recording ==
14 songs were initially selected for the album, the recording of which began in September 1982 and continued in the first months of 1983 until the release of the record, but later the tracks that were considered to be incompatible with the album were removed from the tracking list during the recording phase and the number was reduced to 10 tracks. Vocal and musical recordings at the İstanbul Gelişim Studios were completed in 338 hours. Initially, the recordings were done in a studio with an 8-channel recorder, but with the recording label bringing a 16-channel recorder to Turkey and to obtain "a better sound quality" the initial recordings were deleted and the tracks were rerecorded. Recording songs twice increased costs and a total of £3.5 million was spent for production. Due to these costs, Yeşil Giresunlu described the album's preparation as "one of the trickiest production [processes]" in Turkey to that day. Sound mixing turned out to be more time-consuming compared to instrument recordings. Duyal Karagözoğlu oversaw the general recording, while the sound and orchestral recordings were done by Doruk Onatkut, Garo Mafyan and Uğur Başar. Jeyan Erpi and MFÖ soloists Fuat Güner and Özkan Uğur served as backing vocalists on the tracks.

== Music and lyrics ==
Süperstar '83 is a pop record with jazz, disco and oriental effects. In this period, disco rhythms had become popular around the world, especially in the US. Such rhythms were featured in Pekkan's previous album Süperstar 2, but were more prominent in this new record. Nine of the songs in the album are cover versions, while one is a new composition. As to why she had refrained from voicing Turkish compositions and had decided to cover foreign songs, Pekkan said, "I have to follow what's popular. I cannot necessarily sit and wait for a new composition to be composed. It is not easy to compose anyway. ... Composing is not my domain. I think it is more consistent to voice foreign compositions that fit my voice. [On my previous record] I performed [Turkish compositions] because I was being egged on. Because everybody at that time said, 'Ajda cannot voice Turkish compositions.' So, I performed them to prove that I can do it." All of the lyrics were written by Fikret Şeneş and, just like the previous Süperstar projects, the songs were given to Pekkan based on Şeneş's choice. The songs's new arrangements were done by Garo Mafyan. While the theme of love comes into prominence in the lyrics, a story was established in some of the pieces mostly about deceit, and in some of them about the sense of arrogance and in others impossibility.

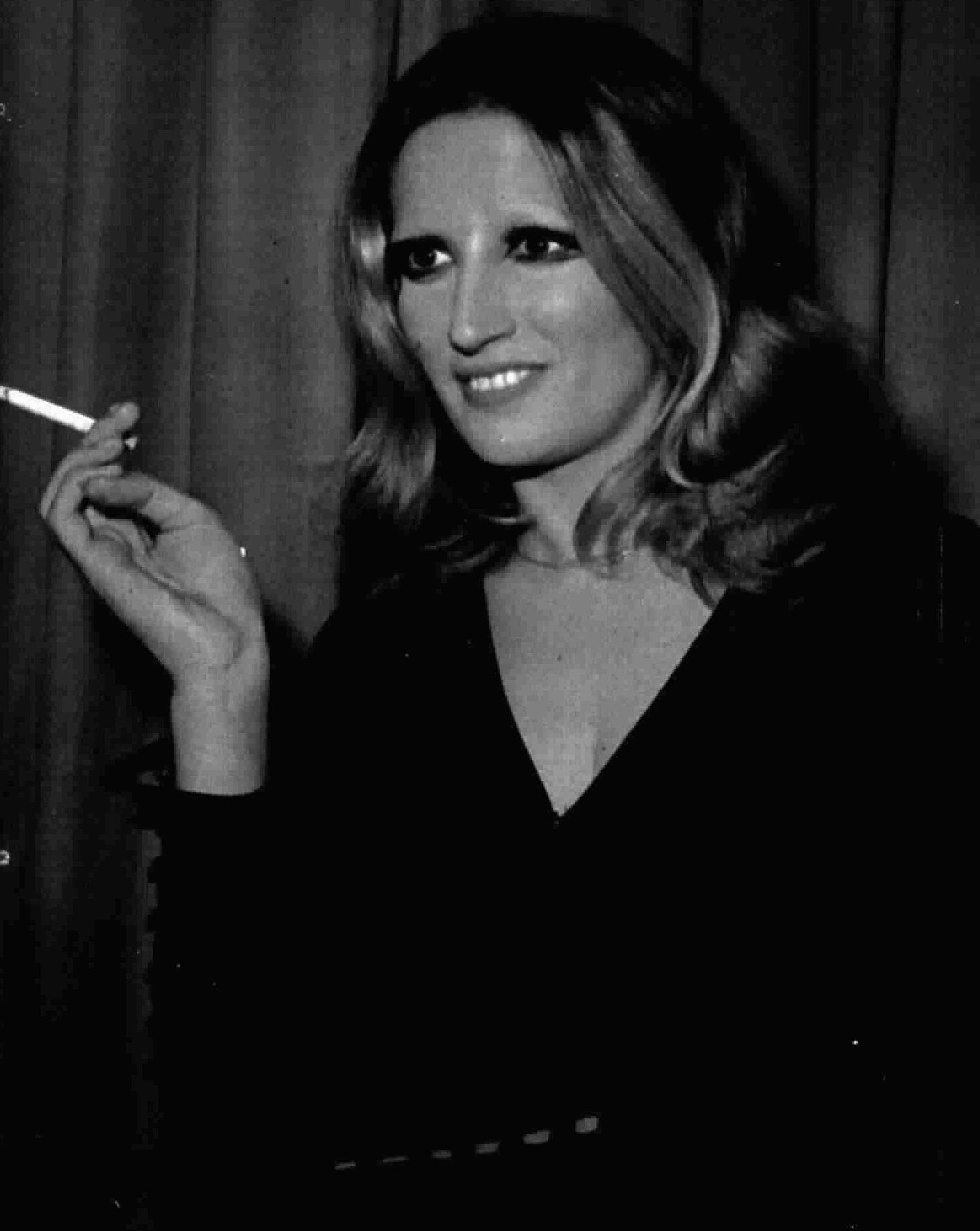
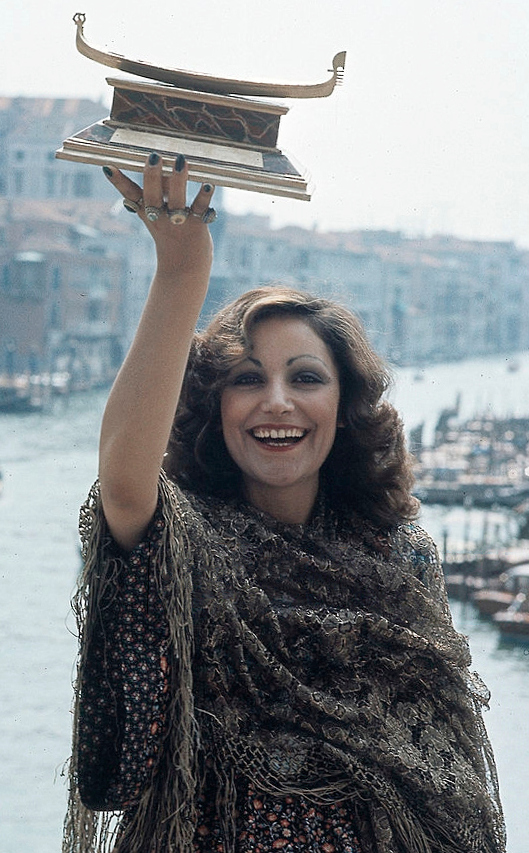
Musical compositions of songs by Italian singers Mina (left) and Mia Martini (right) were used in this LP record. They also influenced Pekkan's musical style.

The lead song "Uykusuz Her Gece" is a cover of "Working Late Tonight" (Amii Stewart, 1983) by American disco singer Amii Stewart. A month before the album's release, Stewart performed this song at the Sanremo Music Festival 1983, which was live on TRT and captured Şeneş's attention. She decided to include the piece in the album at the last moment. The lyrics of "Uykusuz Her Gece", inspired by the original lyrics, tell a woman who is disappointed and gives herself to business life to forget her loved one and continues the strong woman profile created in Pekkan's previous songs "Sana Neler Edeceğim" and "Bambaşka Biri". The second song "Sihirli Aşk" is a cover of the soft rhythm disco song "Mystery of Love" (Donna Summer, 1982) by Donna Summer, an American disco singer, and its lyrics that describe the magic of love are also under the influence of the lyrics of the original song. The keyboard sounds at the introduction and right after the chorus are samples from Bach's "The Well-Tempered Clavier", Book I No. 2: Prelude and Fugue in C minor, BWV 847. The following song "Düşünme Hiç"s musical composition is taken from Italian singer Mina's song "Il Cigno Dell'Amore" (Italiana, 1982) and the way Pekkan performs the song in jazz form is similar to Mina's original performance of the song. Its lyrics mention the beauties of a past love and talks about the arrogance and hatred that put an end to it. The fourth song "Güneş Yorgun" is the only new and Turkish composition in the album. Composed by Arif Serdengeçti, the song features jazz rhythms similar to "Düşünme Hiç". "Bir Günah Gibi", the album's fifth song and the last song on the record's A side, is about a secret love. Its music is from a Russian folk song titled "Dark Eyes" and it was mainly covered based on a version performed by Julio Iglesias titled "Nathalie" (Momentos, 1982).

The sixth song and the first song on the record's B side, "Son Yolcu" is a cover of the song "Senza Fiato" (Italiana, 1982) by Mina, one of Pekkan's influences. The next song "Sana Doğru" is about a person who always finds the most difficult of love. Its music is taken from Italian singer Mia Martini's song "Quante Volte" (Quante volte... ho contato le stelle, 1982) and there are similarities between the way both Martini and Pekkan voice the song. The eighth song "Sen ve Ben" was originally written for Beyza Başar who performed it for the first time under the name "Senin Yolunda" (Sev Sev, 1981). The new oriental tune of the song, which Pekkan used to re-record the track for this album is a cover of the song "Juif Espagnol" (Enrico Macias, 1980) by the French singer Enrico Macias, with whom she gave a joint concert in Olympia, Paris in 1976. The next song "Kader Rüzgârı" was not written for Pekkan and was originally recorded by Sezer Güvenirgil under the name "Anılar Konuşsa" (Mutluluğun Bedeli, 1982). Its music was taken from the instrumental piece "Tahiya Li Fairuz / Hommage a Fairuz" (Habbaytak Bessayf, 1974) by French musician Claude Ciari and unlike other songs in the album, it is the only song in which oriental sounds are seen in a higher degree. The closing song "Beyaz Ev" is a ballad and the lyrics are related to feelings in a one-way love. It's a cover of the song "La Balada Del Pianista" (Escenas de Amor, 1982) by Puerto Rican singer José Feliciano.

== Cover and design ==
To catch up with the premiere of the musical Süperstar Ajda '83, the record and cover designing was carried out faster than usual and was completed in 12 days. The cover photographs were taken by Sedat Dizici, and Erdoğan Günay served as the graphic designer. Two different protective cardboard covers were prepared for the album. On the outer cover, there is a portrait of Ajda Pekkan against a blue background, while the original cover that appears when inside this cardboard includes a photo of Pekkan lying down with a Van cat. The photo is similar to the one taken for Michael Jackson's album Thriller (1982), in which he embraces a tiger cub. Pekkan's appearance on the original cover is a reflection of the style she used throughout the year. Her hair, dyed in brown with a mane haircut, was inspired by the fashion of the period. Bulvar newspaper compared her new image with that of Linda Gray. The cover of the album's special edition, released in May 2008 as a digipak, was redesigned using Pekkan's Van cat photo on a purple background decorated with stars. In versions released by Türküola Müzik in Germany, a cover totally different from the other ones was used.

The design of the vinyl record was done in a different way than the other vinyls previously published in the country. Instead of preparing a typical black phonograph record, the album was released on translucent phonograph records, becoming the first of its own in Turkey. As a result, the popularity of this type of phonograph records increased at the Unkapanı Recorders Market. The carbon used to make PVC, the main ingredient of the usual black phonograph records, made these new discs more durable as well as giving it a black color. The new translucent designs were obtained by removing carbon from the building materials. Pekkan had seen these translucent records during her stay in the US, and her request to use this design for her new album was approved by producer Yeşil Giresunlu. After the release of Süperstar '83 on translucent phonograph records, in the same year Ümit Besen's new album Dostlar Sağ Olsun followed suit and many other singers did the same for their new releases. In July 1983, the album was also released in a format called picture disc. The record was not translucent in this format and the cover photo of the album was printed on it.

== Release and promotion ==
Süperstar '83 was released on 19 March 1983 by Balet Plak as phonograph records. In the weak after its release, it ranked 17th on Hey magazine's Local Pop Music/Foreign Pop Music chart and a week later it topped the chart and kept this position for five weeks. It spent a total of 25 weeks on the list. The musical show Süperstar Ajda '83, which started on 18 March and took place in Şan Music Hall in Istanbul on various days for two months, constituted the first leg of the album promotions. The show also featured American singer Tommy Garrett, a Czechoslovak theater group famous for performing the Black Wits show, British musical comedian Alain Kemble, 18 of Gold Angels Ballet performers from England, and 24 members of İstanbul Gelişim Orchestra. Mazhar Alanson, Fuat Güner and Özkan Uğur trio and Jeyan Erpi appeared on the stage as backing vocalists. Preparations for the show began one month in advance, and songs other than the ones originally performed in Büyük Kabare were performed in this show for the first time. On the second day of the musical show, cocktails were served to celebrate the new work and the album record was given to the public for the first time.

To promote the record, Pekkan gave concerts in different cities including Istanbul, Ankara, İzmir and Bursa, and performed in various fairs and locations across Turkey. According to music critic Naim Dilmener, not only some songs but "almost every song [from the album] was known well" thanks to the Süperstar Ajda '83 musical. Although Pekkan stated that after this musical she did not want to work in casinos again and wanted to perform big shows with crowded teams, she started to perform again in casinos in August 1983 when the income remaining following the musical was lower than her income from performances in casinos. Simultaneously with the promotional musical and concerts for the album, she continued working on the Büyük Kabare musical with Metin Akpinar and Zeki Alasya throughout the year and introduced her new tracks through this show as well. In August 1983, she performed with this cabaret many times during the İzmir Fair and around 35 thousand tickets were sold for the show every night she appeared on the stage. Together with this, the album increased Pekkan's income in general and she paid ₺35 million in tax, becoming the singer with the highest tax payments in Turkey in 1983.

In addition to the concerts, the album promotions were also done via radio and television. Music videos shot for some of the songs in the album were shown to the audience in color, with the country's only official radio and television corporation broadcasting them TRT that year. The music videos for "Uykusuz Her Gece", "Bir Günah Gibi", "Son Yolcu" and "Düşünme Hiç" featured scenes where Pekkan was shown performing the songs alone. Pekkan performed her songs in various programs on TRT and promoted them on television. In May 1983, she appeared on the TV program Boğaziçi'nden and performed the songs "Uykusuz Her Gece" and "Bir Günah Gibi". Later for the Ramadan Feast in July, she performed the songs "Uykusuz Her Gece", "Bir Günah Gibi" and "Son Yolcu" on the same program. In November, she was a guest on the program Bizden Size and performed the song "Uykusuz Her Gece". Additionally in December, she appeared on Renk newspaper's 1983 Super Artists award ceremony during which she performed "Uykusuz Her Gece", "Bir Günah Gibi", "Sen ve Ben", "Son Yolcu" and "Sana Doğru". In the same month, to mark the 1984 New Year's Eve she appeared on a special program by TRT titled Ünlüler Balosu (Celebrities Ball) and performed "Uykusuz Her Gece" and "Bir Günah Gibi".

== Critical reception ==
Süperstar '83 received positive reviews from music criticism and was considered Pekkan's return to the pop music scene after a few years in crisis. Hey magazine gave the album a grade of 5/5, appreciating the singer's vocals and the new arrangements of the cover songs made by Garo Mafyan. It considered Pekkan's decision to use foreign compositions on this album as an appropriate step, and added, "Ajda has a dress that has been compiled from foreign compositions so far. And when she takes off this dress and throws it away, she gets naked. The Arabesque clothing worn on her also does not suit her. In Ajda's [previous] LPs released by other labels, the 'domestic composition, domestic artist' mindset made this mistake bigger and the singer became distanced from the pop source that had created her. ... Pekkan's international platform pushes the artist to find foreign pieces that will maintain their [quality] level." Gündüz Tuna from Milliyet newspaper, on the other hand, said "This last album is the opposite of the previous records smells very Western." Because of the newly tested 16-channel system, he found the record's sound quality "low enough to [make you] search for the previous albums".

Music critic Naim Dilmener gave positive reviews for the work, which he later included in Hür Doğdum Hür Yaşarım (2007), a book he wrote about Pekkan. In his review, he wrote: "The album Süperstar '83 will make the pop, which is thought to attract nobody's attention, echo in all the houses. Ajda Pekkan will be the most important person who can wave the pop flag properly while everyone is approaching the arabesque in an open or closed manner. ... This album enchanted fans expecting proper 'Ajda Pekkan songs' from Ajda Pekkan after the Süperstar series." Music critic Yavuz Hakan Tok, who evaluated the album in an article he shared on his personal website, also appreciated the work and added "Although nine songs are adapted from foreign songs, it is one of the unique albums not only of Ajda's career, but also of the history of the country's pop music, in terms of both the height of the musicality, the vocal performance of Ajda and the hit potential." He also noted that with this album, Pekkan "once again reached the peak". In his review for 45'lik magazine, radioman Michael Kuyucu wrote: "The most important feature of the album, which captured a strong pop sound, was that it was a modern album. ... This recorded included higher quality songs than the previous ones in Süperstar series, causing some songs to be loved later rather than instantly."

== Awards ==
Süperstar '83 was honored with awards given to the singer and the work itself in the year that it was released, and later in the following years. The album later managed to become one of the most important albums in the Turkish pop music rankings. At the Golden Artemis Awards organized by the Journalists Association of İzmir in September 1983, Pekkan was awarded as the Female Turkish Light Music Artist of the Year. In the 1983 Super Artists Survey organized by Renk newspaper for its readers in December 1983, Ajda Pekkan was selected as the Female Turkish Light Music Artist of the Year and received the award at the ceremony at Şan Theater. The newspaper wrote that on this occasion, Pekkan deserved the great acclaim thanks to the musicals Büyük Kabare and Süperstar Ajda '83 and the song "Bir Günah Gibi". In the 1983 Music Oscars ceremony, organized by Hey magazine in January 1984, the singer was awarded the Female Singer of the Year, while the Süperstar '83 won the Light Music LP of the Year award. In addition, Hey magazines chose the album as the Album of the Year and selected "Uykusuz Her Gece" and "Bir Günah Gibi" as the second and third best songs of the year, respectively. Pekkan was presented the Light Music Artist of the Year awards at the Tele magazine's 1983 TV Oscars award ceremony and the 1984 Golden Butterfly Awards.

In 2017, Hürriyet gathered a team of judges consisting of journalists, singers, musicians, radiomen, producers and music critics who published the list of Turkey's Best 100 Albums that included Süperstar '83 as well as the first two installments of the Süperstar series. For the album, which ranked 27th on the list they wrote: "Süperstar is Ajda's comeback album. What a return! Both Ajda and Fikret Şeneş, with whom she started working again, are on form." In the same year, the album ranked fifth on the Revolutionary Albums of Our Pop History prepared by Oben Budak from Habertürk newspaper.

== Track listing ==
| No. | Title | Lyrics | Music | Length |
|---|---|---|---|---|
| 1. | "Uykusuz Her Gece" | Fikret Şeneş | Mario & Geosy Capuano; Simon Boswell^{[a]} | 3:14 |
| 2. | "Sihirli Aşk" | Fikret Şeneş | John Lang; Richard Page; Bill Meyers^{[a]} | 2:57 |
| 3. | "Düşünme Hiç" | Fikret Şeneş | Anselmo Genovese | 4:11 |
| 4. | "Güneş Yorgun" | Fikret Şeneş | Arif Serdengeçti | 3:34 |
| 5. | "Bir Günah Gibi" | Fikret Şeneş | Traditional; Roman Arcusa; Julio Iglesias^{[b]} | 3:53 |
| 6. | "Son Yolcu" | Fikret Şeneş | Anselmo Genovese; Osvaldo Miccike^{[b]} | 3:43 |
| 7. | "Sana Doğru" | Fikret Şeneş | Mia Martini; Shel Shapiro^{[b]} | 3:38 |
| 8. | "Sen ve Ben" | Fikret Şeneş | Enrico Macias; Didier Barbelivien^{[b]} | 2:39 |
| 9. | "Kader Rüzgârı" | Fikret Şeneş | Claude Ciari^{[c]}; Karl Schäfer^{[c]} | 3:52 |
| 10. | "Beyaz Ev" | Fikret Şeneş | Leonardo Schultz; Raúl Abramzon^{[a]} | 3:26 |
| Total length: | | | | 35:07 |

Notes

- ^[a] – It is not mentioned in any edition.
- ^[b] – It is not mentioned on the original record, but it is mentioned in the next editions.
- ^[c] – On the original record the composer is referred to as B. Sager, but in later editions it corrected as Ciari and Schäfer.

== Personnel ==
Credits adapted from Süperstar '83 record notes and album booklet.

- Ajda Pekkan – vocals (all songs)
- İstanbul Gelişim – orchestra
- Selçuk Başar – guitar
- Garo Mafyan – arrangement, keyboard instruments, orchestra recording, sound recording, mixing, remixing, orchestration
- Uğur Başar – bass guitar, orchestra recording, soloist recording, mixing, remixing
- Asım Ekren – davul
- Fuat Güner – backing vocals
- Jeyan Erpi – backing vocals
- Özkan Uğur – backing vocals
- Doruk Onatkut – orchestra recording, soloist recording, mixing, remixing
- Duyal Karagözoğlu – technical supervisor
- Yeşil Giresunlu – producer
- Sedat Dizici – cover photographs
- Erdoğan Günay – graphic design
- Galeri Matbaası – printing
- Metin & Mehmet – hairstylist

== Charts ==
=== Weekly charts ===
| Chart (1983) | Peak position |
|---|---|
| Hey Local Pop Music/Foreign Pop Music | 1 |

=== Year-end charts ===
| Chart (1983) | Position |
|---|---|
| Hey Magazine Albums of the Year | 1 |

=== All-time charts ===
| Chart (All-time) | Position |
|---|---|
| Hürriyet Turkey's Top 100 Albums | 27 |

== Release history ==
| Country | Date | Format(s) | Label | Ref. |
|---|---|---|---|---|
| Turkey | 19 March 1983 | LP; MC | Balet Plak | |
| Germany | 1983 | LP; MC | Türküola Müzik | |
| Turkey | 24 May 2008 | CD; digital download | Ossi Müzik | |
| Germany | 2018 | LP | Türküola Müzik | |
