= Ayten Alpman =

Turkish jazz and pop singer

Ayten Alpman (10 October 1929 – 20 April 2012) was a Turkish jazz and pop singer who gained fame in the 1970s with the song "Memleketim" ("My Country") during the 1974 Cyprus Peace Operation.

== Biography ==
Born in Istanbul, Turkey, in 1929, Alpman worked as a soloist for Istanbul Radio after finishing high school. She began her singing career during the 1950s and was encouraged by Turkish producer Arif Mardin to sing jazz songs in the first years of her career. She released her first record, "Sayonara/Passion Flower", in 1959. In 1972, Alpman released her song "Memleketim" ("My Country") which became immensely popular in Cyprus and Turkey in 1974 during the Cyprus conflict. She rarely entered the recording studio, and had released only two LPs throughout her career. Her most notable songs include, "Sensiz Olmam", "Yanımda Olsa", and "Ben Varım". Alpman's latest release was a compilation of her best-known singles released by Ada Music in 1999.

== Personal life ==
Alpman married jazz pianist and composer İlham Gencer in 1953, with whom she had two children. On Friday 20 April 2012, Alpman died of respiratory failure in Istanbul at the age of 82. She was buried on Sunday 22 April 2012, in a funeral attended by her family and friends in Istanbul's Ulus Cemetery following afternoon prayers in the Teşvikiye Mosque. Turkish Prime Minister Recep Tayyip Erdoğan released a message stating that "Alpman's songs will be remembered forever".
