= Ajda '93 =

Studio album by Ajda Pekkan
- Released: 17 May 1993
- Recorded: DMC
- Genre: Pop, synth-pop
- Length: 40:16
- Label: Raks Music
- Producer: Bonus Music Production

Ajda Pekkan chronology
Hoşgör sen (1993)	Ajda '93 (1993)	Ajda 96 (1996)

Singles from Cool Kadın
- 1. "Sarıl Bana" Released: 1993; 2. "Oyalama Beni" Released: 1993; 3. "Ağlama Anne" Released: 1993; 4. "Eyvah" Released: 1993; 5. "Yok" Released: 1994; 6. "365 Gün" Released: 1994

Ajda '93 is Turkish pop singer Ajda Pekkan's fourteenth studio album, which was released on 17 May 1993 in Turkey.

== Track listing ==
No.	Title	Writer(s)	Composer (s)	Length
1.	"Sarıl Bana"	Ülkü Aker	Norayr Demirci	3:40
2.	"Başkasını Tanımam"	Ülkü Aker	Norayr Demirci	4:01
3.	"Ağlama Anne"	Sezen Aksu	Apochairetismos (Thalassa)	4:30
4.	"Oyalama Beni"	Eda Özülkü	Metin Özülkü	4:39
5.	"Gül Dostum Gül"	Aşkın Tuna	Norayr Demirci	3:57
6.	"Eyvah"	Sezen Aksu	Atilla Şereftuğ	4:38
7.	"Oldum Olası"	Dilek Çumralı	Atilla Şereftuğ	3:33
8.	"Yok (Ne)"	Aysel Gürel	Kostas Haritodiplomenos · Atilla Şereftuğ	3:57
9.	"365 Gün"	Aşkın Tuna	Norayr Demirci	4:08
10.	"Düşme Sakın"	Aşkın Tuna	Norayr Demirci	3:44
Total length:				40:16
