= James Reynolds (artist) =

American illustrator and writer

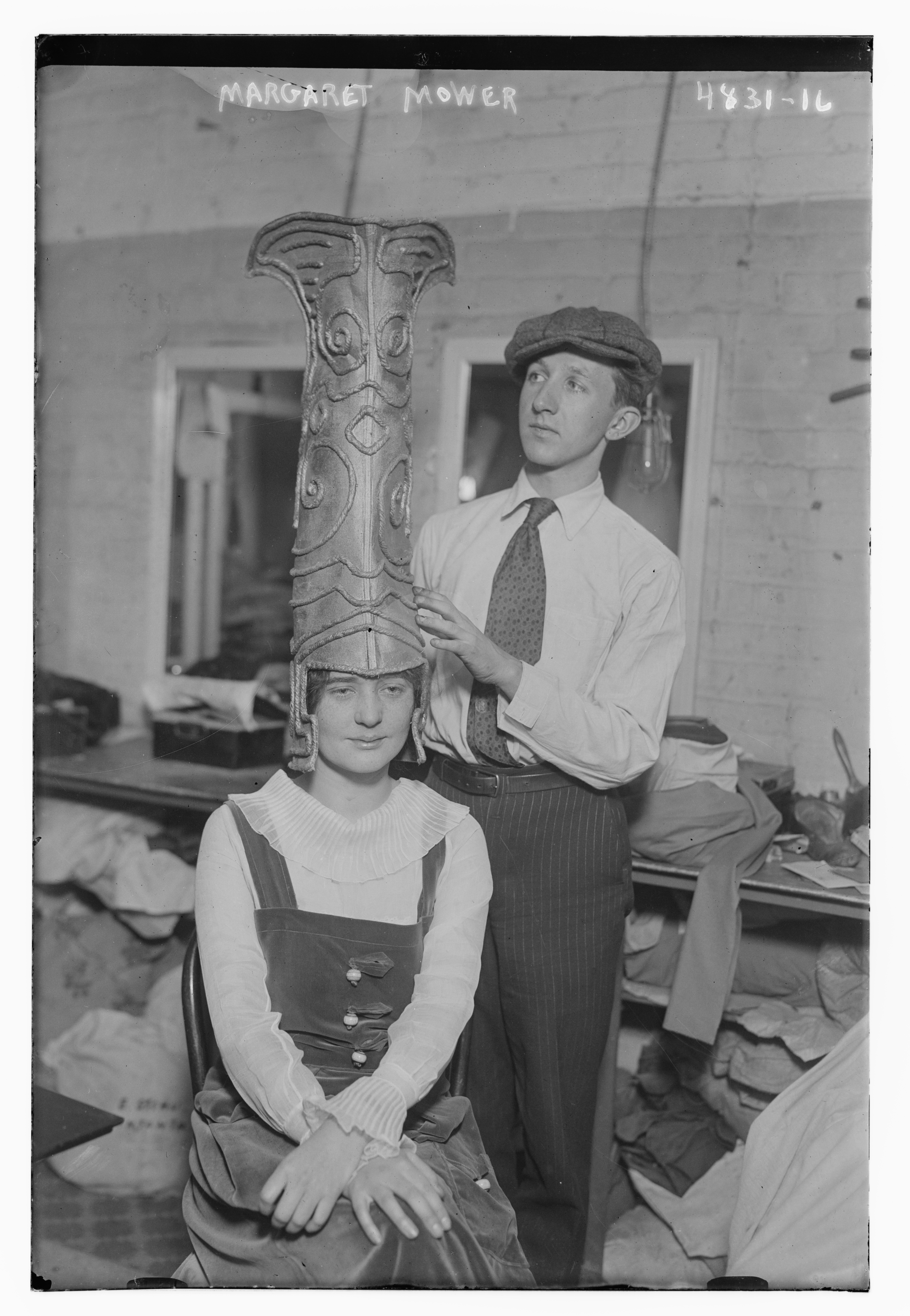
- James Reynolds with the actress Margaret Mower
- Born: October 22, 1891; Syracuse, New York
- Died: July 21, 1957; Bellagio, Lombardy
- Other names: Harold Warner Reynolds, Jimmy
- Occupations: Writer, illustrator, author, painter

Harold Warner Reynolds, simply known as James Reynolds, or also with the nickname Jimmy (October 22, 1891 in Syracuse, New York – July 21, 1957 in Bellagio, Lombardy), was an American writer, painter, illustrator, set designer and costume designer.

Born into a family of Irish descent, son of John JW Reynolds and Carrie Sophia Eldredge, he began his career as a Broadway designer in 1919, for musicals, operettas and magazines, including the 1921-1923 editions of Ziegfeld Follies and Dearest Enemy (1925). He was also involved in a number of non-musical works, including These Charming People (1925), The Royal Family (1927) and Coming of Age (1934).

Reynolds left the design business in the 1930s to devote himself to writing and painting full time. Their works are signed with the initials of name and surname and a star (J.R. ☆). He was also a great horse enthusiast and expert.

He became a writer late in his life (at the age of fifty) and his topics were broad ranging from horses, ghosts, European travel and Palladian architecture.

Among his many published works include Wing Commander Paddy Finucane A Memoir (1942); A World of Horses (1950); Ghosts in American Houses (1955) and many other titles.

He died at the Grand Hotel Villa Serbelloni in Bellagio, a tourist resort on Lake Como where he had spent his summer holidays for twenty years, struck by a stroke on 21 July 1957.

When James Reynolds died in Bellagio in 1957 there was some confusion about his past: his place of birth has been indicated by several sources in New York, Virginia and Ireland. He was often confused with the illustrator named James Warren Reynolds of 618 N142d St in New York and born on October 22, 1894, in Warrenton Virginia, with James Walter Reynolds (1884–1956), pulp magazine illustrator or even with James Elliott Reynolds (1926–2010), a fine Old West art painter.

He was buried in the Municipal Cemetery of Bellagio.

== Books by James Reynolds ==
- Paddy Finucane A Memoir, (1942)
- A World of Horses, (1947)
- Ghosts in Irish Houses, (1947)
- Andrea Palladio, (1948)
- Gallery of Ghosts, (1949)
- Baroque Splendour, (1950)
- The Grand Wide Way, A Novel, (1951)
- Maeve the Huntress, A Novel, (1952)
- James Reynolds’ Ireland, (1953)
- Pageant of Italy, (1954)
- Fabulous Spain, (1955)
- Sovereign Britain, (1955)
- Ghosts in American Houses, (1955)
- More Ghosts in Irish Houses, (1956)
- Panorama of Austria, (1957)
