= Pliny's Comedy and Tragedy villas =

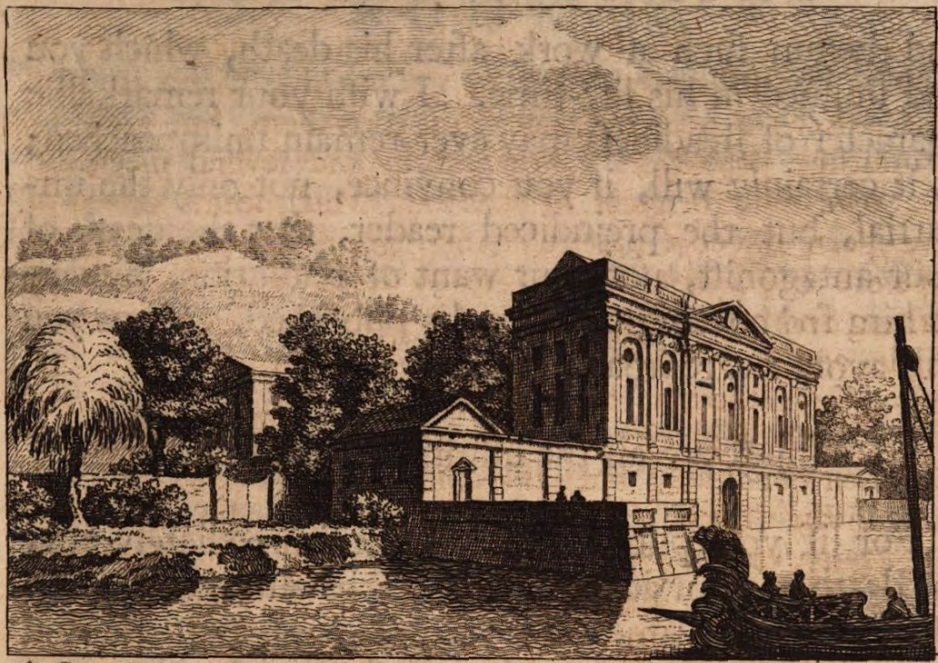
Imagined depiction of the Comedy villa by Samuel Wale, 1751

Pliny's Comedy and Tragedy villas were two of the several villas owned by Pliny the Younger during the 1st century in the area surrounding Lake Como in northern Italy. (Note: In modern-day Italy, they are known respectively as Villa Commedia and Villa Tragedia.) In one of Pliny's letters to his boyhood friend Voconius Romanus (Book 9, Epistle 7), he named them as his favourites. In his letter, Pliny wrote that the Tragedy villa was atop a ridge above the lake, but the Comedy villa was right on the water's edge and that "each of them has particular beauties; a diversity which renders them to their master as still more agreeable." According to the letter, Pliny had derived the villas' names from their geographical positions and the conventions of Roman theatre. He saw the Tragedy villa as rising from its setting like an actor wearing the tragedian's high platform boots (cothurni), while the Comedy villa down by the lake wore the lowly comedian's slippers (socculi). Both villas have long since vanished, and their exact locations remain a subject of speculation.

Although the Tragedy villa is widely assumed to have been located in Bellagio somewhere on the estate of the present-day Villa Serbelloni, no architectural remains have ever been found. (Note: The Villa Serbelloni and its surrounding estate dates from the mid-16th century. It was acquired by the Rockefeller Foundation in 1959 and serves as the foundation's international study and conference center.) It is even less clear where the Comedy villa was situated. The 16th-century historian Paolo Giovio thought that it was at Lenno facing the Tragedy villa but that its remains were now underwater. The Flemish geographer Abraham Ortelius, Giovio's younger contemporary, also wrote that Lenno was the site of the Comedy villa. However, in 1876, a Roman mosaic floor and many Roman coins were found in Lierna, another small town on Lake Como. Many there now think that the mosaic floor may have been part of the Comedy villa. In the early 1900s the French geographer Élisée Reclus had described Lierna as the site of a Pliny villa, although he did not specify which one.

In 1751 John Boyle, 5th Earl of Orrery, a close friend of Alexander Pope, published an English translation of Pliny's letters. The letter to Voconius Romanus describing the Comedy and Tragedy villas was illustrated with an imagined depiction of the Comedy villa by Samuel Wale. According to the architectural historian Pierre de la Ruffinière du Prey, the villa in Wale's drawing bears a noticeable resemblance to Pope's villa on the River Thames. Pliny's own description of the Comedy villa mentioned that its terrace was gently curved like the bay on which it stood. He could fish directly from his bedroom window and likened lying in his bed to lying in a fishing boat on the lake.
