= Villa d'Este, Cernobbio =

Renaissance patrician residence in Cernobbio in northern Italy

Villa d'Este
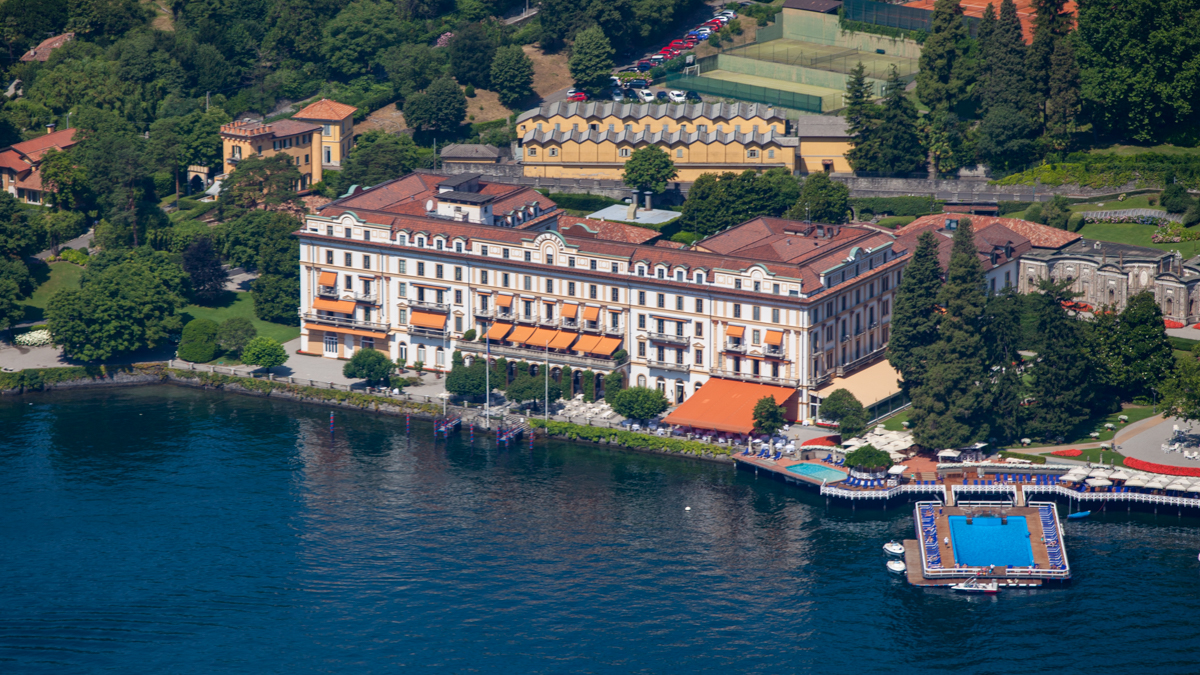
- Villa d'Este as seen from a small plane

- Location within Italy
- Former names: Villa del Garovo
- Alternative names: Nuova Villa d'Este

General information
- Status: Luxury Hotel
- Type: Villa, Hotel
- Architectural style: Renaissance
- Location: Via Regina, 40, Cernobbio, Italy
- Coordinates: 45°50′41.91″N 9°4′47.64″E
- Construction started: 1565
- Completed: 1570
- Opened: 1873 (as hotel)
- Renovated: Various, incl. 1784, 1815–1820
- Client: Cardinal Tolomeo Gallio
- Owner: Villa d'Este S.p.A.

Dimensions
- Other dimensions: Park: 25 acres (10 ha)

Design and construction
- Architect: Pellegrino Tibaldi
- Awards: Numerous hotel awards (see text)

Other information
- Number of rooms: 152 rooms and suites, plus private villas

Website
- www.villadeste.com

The Villa d'Este, originally Villa del Garovo, is a Renaissance patrician residence in Cernobbio on the shores of Lake Como in northern Italy, close to the city of Como. Both the villa and the 25-acre (10 ha) park which surrounds it have undergone significant changes since their sixteenth-century origins as a summer residence for Cardinal Tolomeo Gallio, who had been born in the village. Visiting the garden in 1903 for Century Magazine, Edith Wharton found this to be ‘the only old garden on Como which keeps more than a fragment of its original architecture’, and noted that ‘though Queen Caroline anglicised part of the grounds, the main lines of the Renaissance garden still exist’. It was Queen Caroline who gave it the name Nuova Villa d'Este, though it has never belonged to the Italian d'Este family (the cadet branch of the House of Welf, which produced Britain's Hanoverian monarchs).

Since 1873, the Villa d'Este complex has been a luxury hotel which is a popular destination for Hollywood celebrities and prominent figures. The hotel complex comprises 152 rooms and suites spread across the Cardinal Building and the Queen's Pavilion, along with several private villas. It features notable amenities such as extensive gardens (a UNESCO World Heritage candidate site), a famous floating pool on the lake, and multiple dining venues. The hotel typically closes for a period during the winter for maintenance but has recently remained open through the Christmas holiday season.

== History ==
Gerardo Landriani, Bishop of Como (1437–1445), founded a female convent here at the mouth of the Garovo torrent in 1442. A century later, Cardinal Tolomeo Gallio demolished the nunnery and commissioned Pellegrino Tibaldi to design a residence for his own use. The Villa del Garovo, together with its luxuriant gardens, was constructed during the years 1565–70 and during the cardinal’s lifetime it became a resort of politicians, intellectuals and ecclesiastics. On Gallio’s death, the villa passed to his family who, over the years, allowed it to sink into a state of some decay.

From 1749 to 1769, it was a Jesuit centre for spiritual exercises, after which it was acquired first by Count Mario Odescalchi and then in 1778 by a Count Marliani. In 1784, it passed to the Milanese Calderari family, who undertook a major restoration project and created a new park all’Italiana, with an impressive nymphaeum and a temple displaying a seventeenth-century statue of Hercules hurling Lichas into the sea. After the death of Marquis Calderari, his wife Vittoria Peluso, a former ballerina at La Scala and known as la Pelusina, married a Napoleonic general, Count Domenico Pino, and a mock fortress was erected in the park in his honour.

In 1815, it became the residence of Caroline of Brunswick, estranged wife of the future King George IV of the United Kingdom, who had been encouraged to live abroad. "Its garden seems almost suspended in the air", she wrote in her diary, "and forms a scene of complete enchantment." She gave it the name Nuova Villa d'Este and had the park landscaped in the English style.

It was converted into a deluxe hotel for the nobility and the high bourgeoisie in 1873, and kept the name Villa d'Este to take advantage of the apparent link with the famous Villa d'Este in Tivoli, near Rome. In 1925 Alfred Hitchcock filmed scenes for his movie The Pleasure Garden on the premises of the hotel. A gala dinner held at the Villa d’Este in 1948 was the scene for the celebrated murder of the wealthy silk manufacturer Carlo Sacchi, shot dead by his lover Countess Pia Bellentani with her husband’s Fegyvergyár automatic pistol.

== 21st century ==
In the 21st century, Villa d'Este continues its legacy as a world-renowned luxury hotel and a prestigious venue for high-profile international events. The property maintains its status as a destination catering to a discerning clientele and hosting significant congresses.

The hotel has consistently received accolades from major travel publications. In June 2009, Forbes recognized it as the best hotel in the world. In 2014, Travel + Leisure magazine listed it as the second-best resort in Europe. More recently, in 2023, Travel + Leisure readers included Villa d'Este in lists for "100 Favorite Hotels in the World", "10 Favorite Resorts in Italy", and "15 Favorite Resorts in Europe". Condé Nast Traveler readers also recognized the hotel, naming it the #2 Hotel in Italy in their 2024 Readers' Choice Awards, following its 150th anniversary as a hotel in 2022. The Michelin Guide awarded the hotel "1 Key" in its 2024 guide.

Villa d'Este continues to host prestigious annual events. Every May, the hotel grounds are the setting for the Concorso d'Eleganza Villa d'Este, a celebrated Concours d'Elegance featuring vintage and concept cars, an event that originated in 1928. The event is organized in cooperation with BMW Group Classic. In September, the hotel hosts the annual Ambrosetti Forum, an international economic conference organized by The European House – Ambrosetti since 1975, attracting prominent figures from politics, finance, and business to discuss global challenges.

The Villa d'Este SpA group has also been expanding its presence in the Lake Como area, acquiring the historic Harry's Bar in Cernobbio in October 2024, and subsequently acquiring the nearby Hotel Regina Olga and Hotel Miralago in November 2024, both slated for major renovations with reopening planned for 2027.

== See also ==
- Villa del Balbianello
- Villa Bernasconi
- Villa Carlotta
- Villa Erba
- Villa Melzi
- Villa Monastero
- Villa Olmo
- Villa Serbelloni
- Villa Vigoni
