= Grand Hotel Villa Serbelloni =

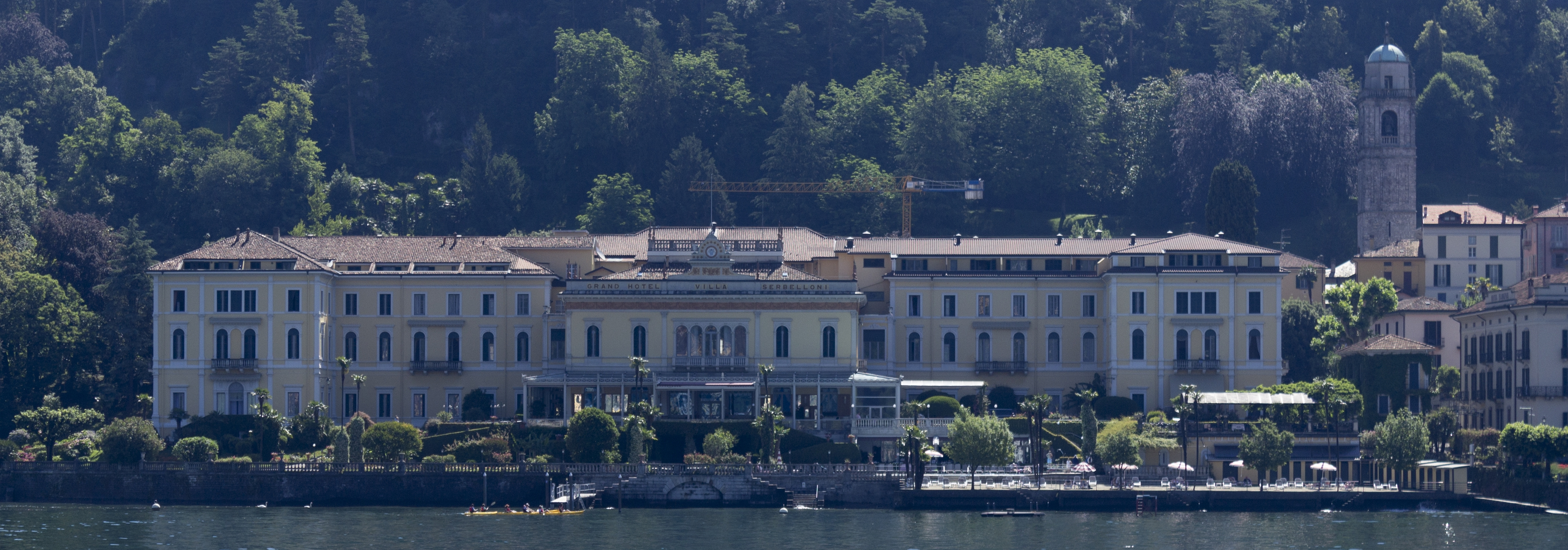
- Grand Hotel Villa Serbelloni on Lake Como, Italy
- Interactive map of the Grand Hotel Villa Serbelloni area

General information
- Location: Bellagio, Italy
- Coordinates: 45°59′20″N 9°15′40″E
- Opened: 1873; 153 years ago

Website
- www.villaserbelloni.com

Grand Hotel Villa Serbelloni is a historic luxury hotel located in Bellagio on the shores of Lake Como in Italy.

== History ==
The hotel was first built as a private villa, commissioned by the Frizzoni family, a noble family originally from the Grisons but established in Bergamo for generations. Construction of the villa, designed by architect Rodolfo Vantini, began in 1851 and was finally completed in 1856, the year of the architect's death. However, the villa was already partially ready in 1854 when it was inaugurated on the occasion of the count Frizzoni's wife's birthday.

In 1872, the villa was acquired by an Italian joint-stock company, the Société des Grands Hôtels, with the intention of transforming the property into a luxury hotel. The new owners entrusted the transformation project to architect Giovanni Ceruti, assisted by architect Ercole Balossi Merlo. Both were former students of Camillo Boito at the Polytechnic University of Milan. The work involved the construction of a long building behind the villa, connected by a covered passage, which extended to form two large side wings overlooking the lake.

The hotel thus opened its doors as the Grand Hotel Bellagio in 1873.

In 1918, the property was bought by the Swiss Arturo Bucher, who undertook modernization works. The Bucher family still owns the hotel today.

Along with the hotel, Arturo Bucher also managed Villa Serbelloni, which was already used as a luxury annex of the Grand Hotel since it was bought in 1905, and after which it was later named. Following the 1929 crisis, the villa was sold, but Bucher nonetheless retained the contractual right to use its name.

== Description ==
The building, located on the lakeshore in Bellagio, features elaborate decorations.

== Gallery ==
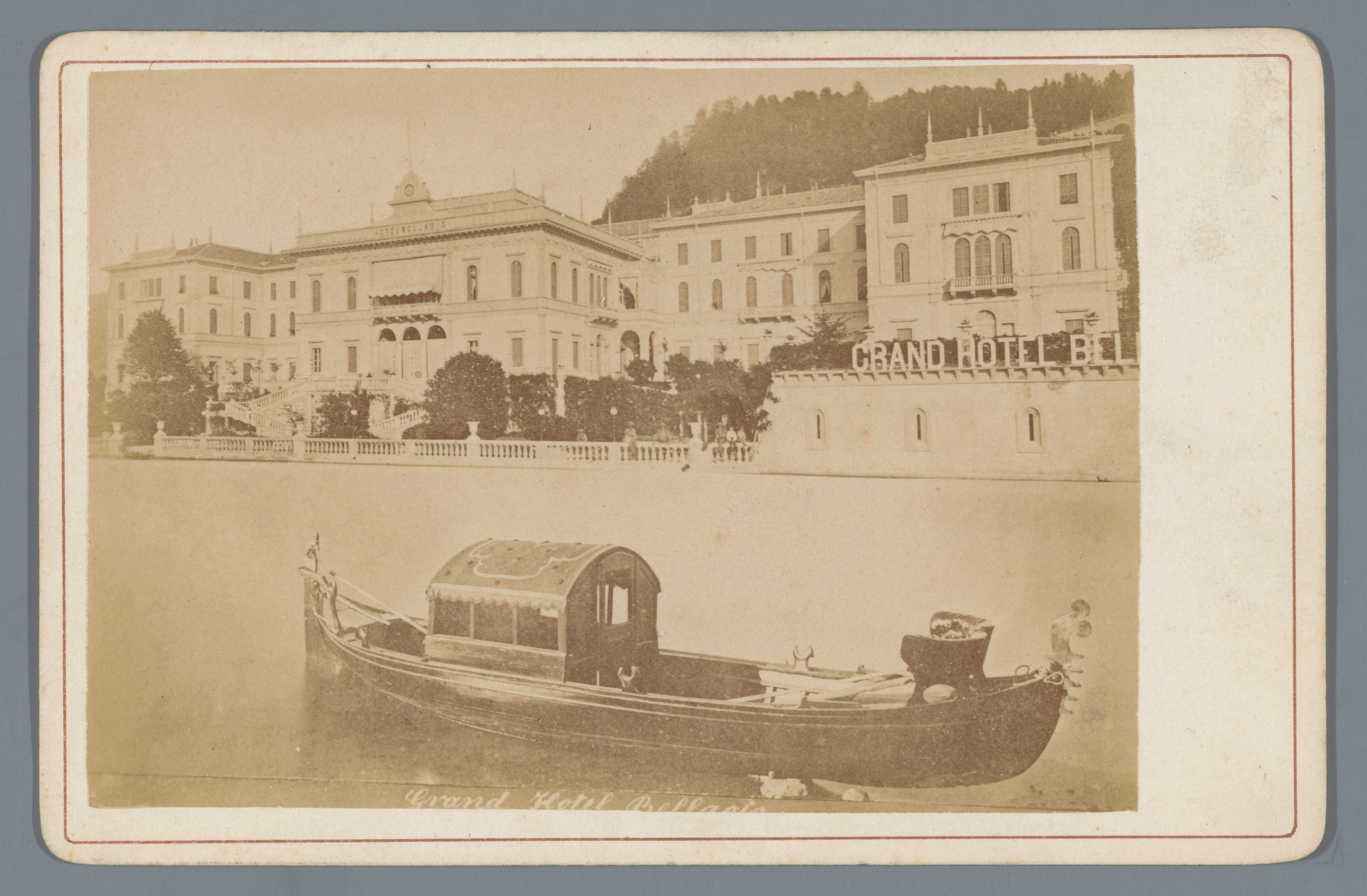

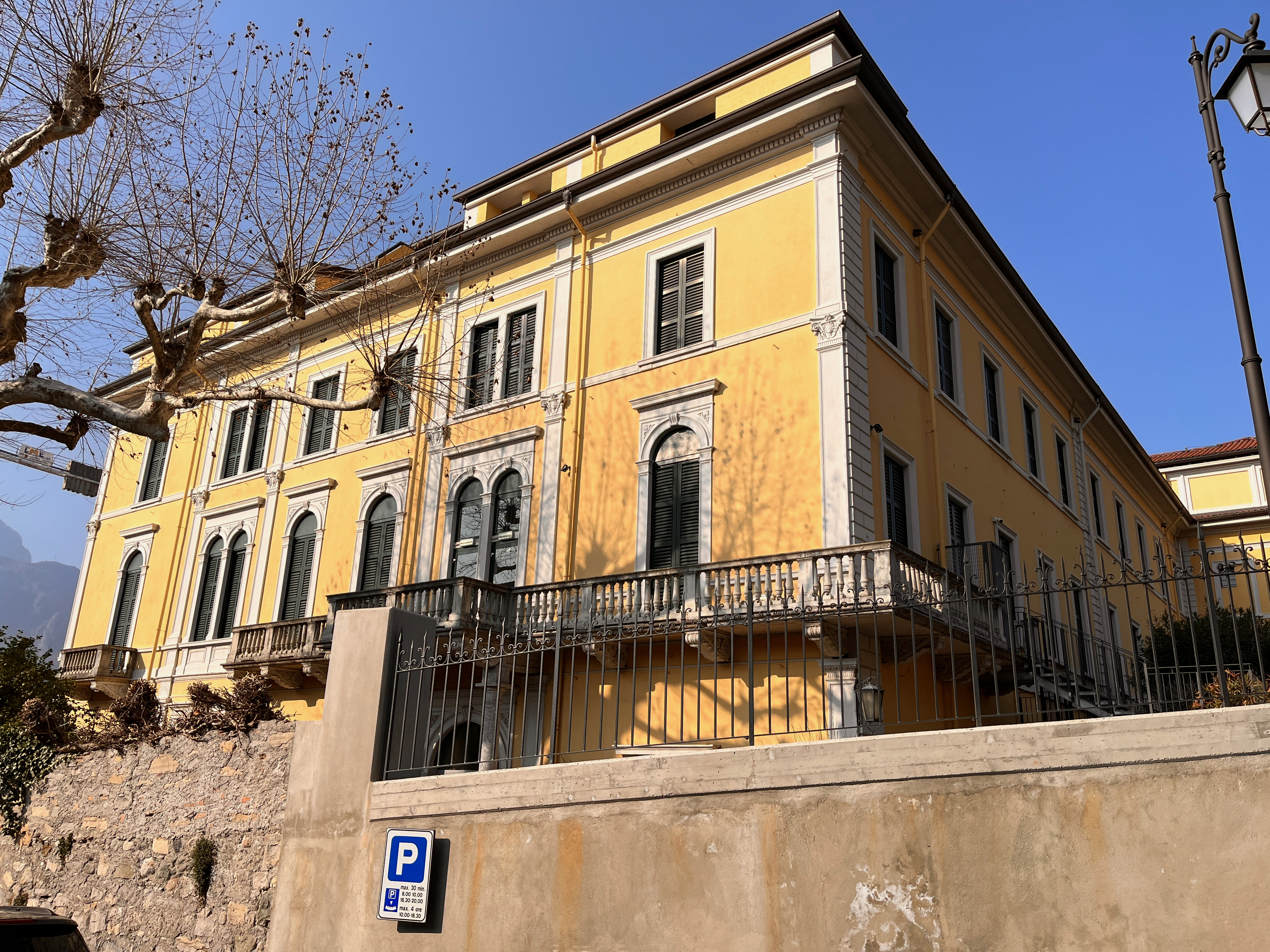

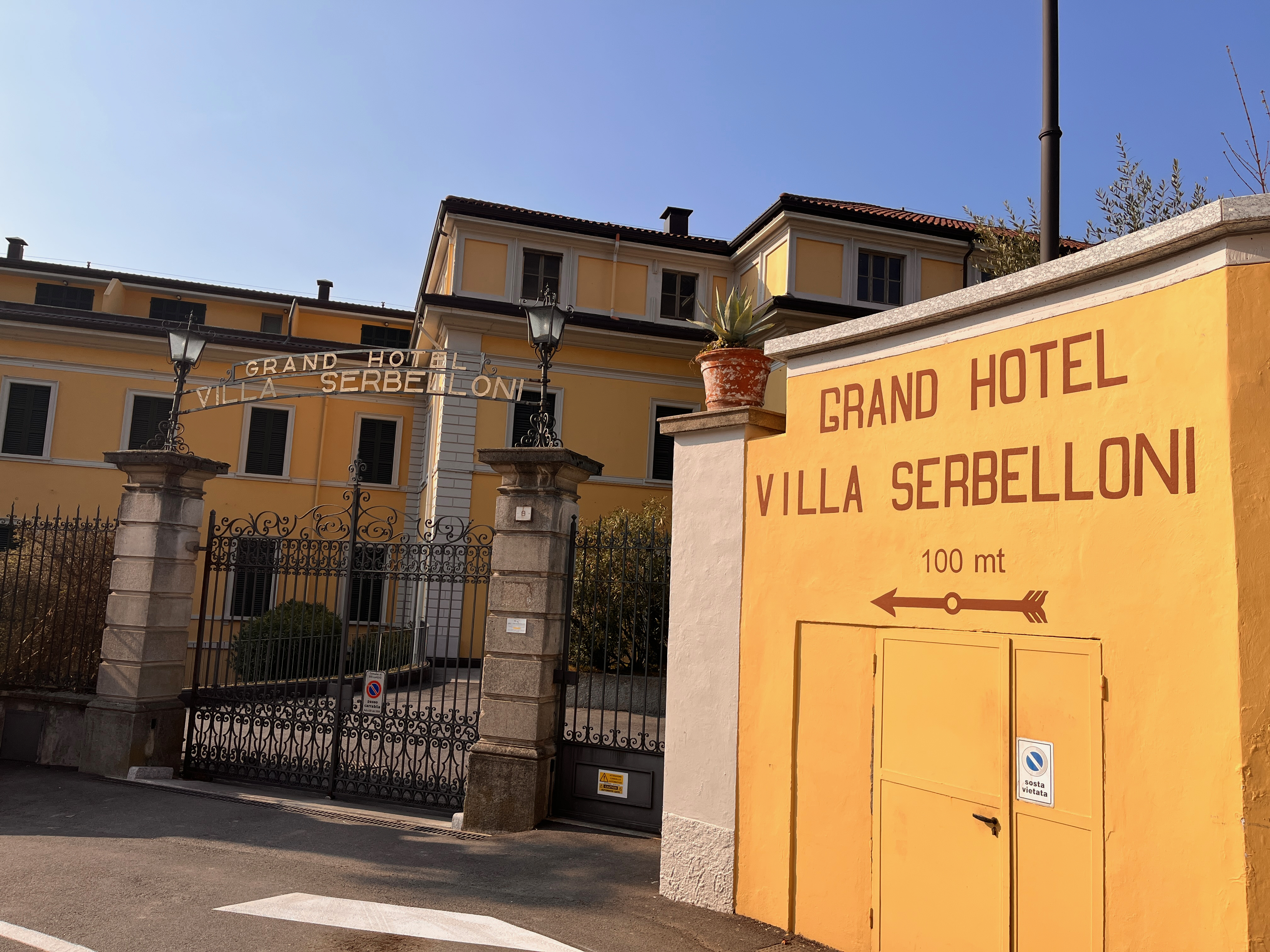
