= Villa Melzi =

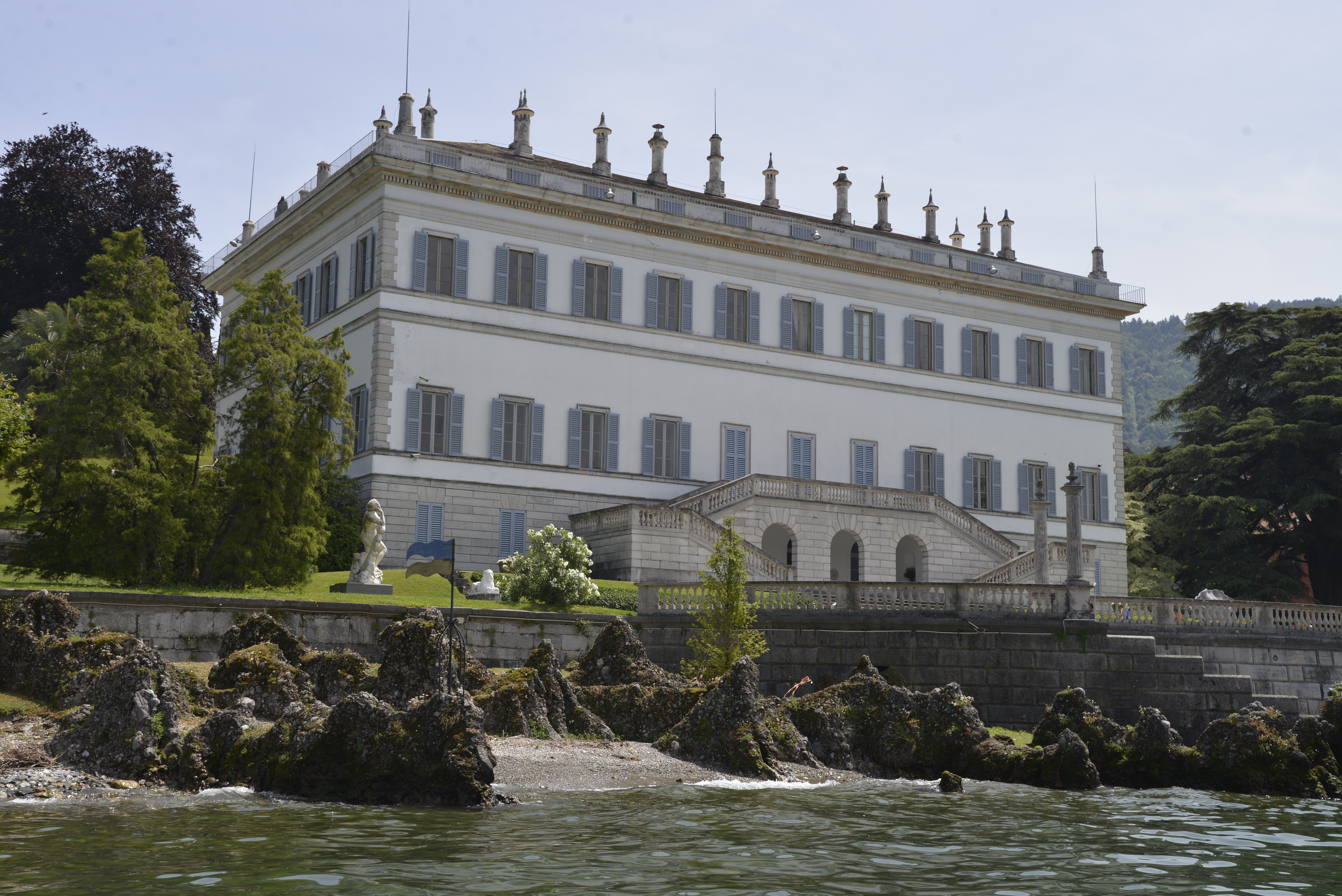
- Villa Melzi in Bellagio
- Click on the map for a fullscreen view

General information
- Architectural style: Neoclassical
- Location: Bellagio, Italy
- Coordinates: 45°58′44.72″N 9°15′11.48″E

Design and construction
- Architect: Giocondo Albertolli

Villa Melzi (also known as Villa Melzi d'Eril) is a neoclassical villa located in Bellagio on the shores of Lake Como, Italy.

== History ==
The villa was commissioned by Francesco Melzi d'Eril and designed in 1808 by Ticinese architect Giocondo Albertolli. Construction works were completed in 1810, although the interiors were not finished until 1813–1815.

== Description ==
The property is composed by the villa proper, a chapel, an orangerie, and sprawling gardens. The villa, located on the lake shore, features a neoclassical style and symmetric façades.

== Gallery ==
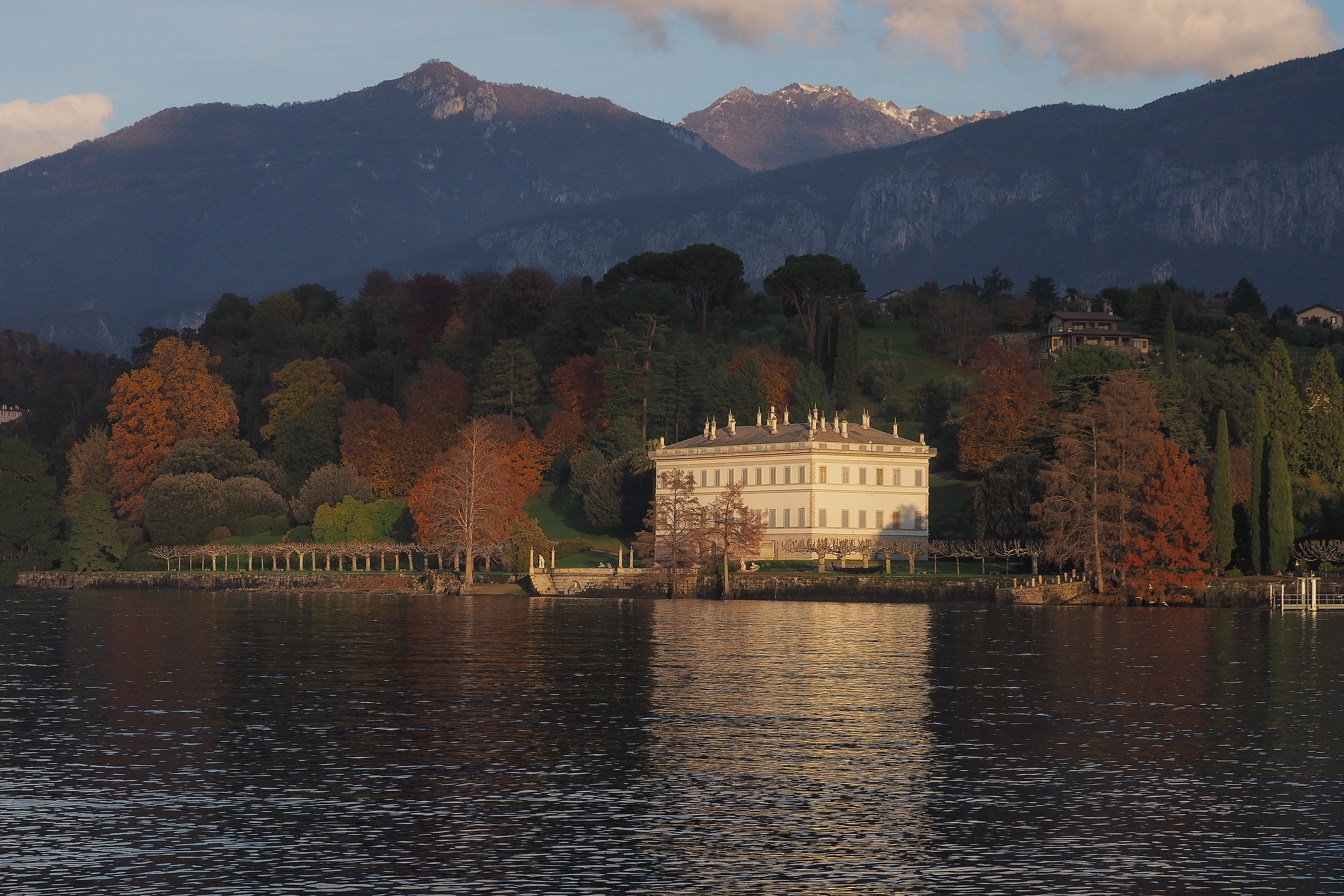

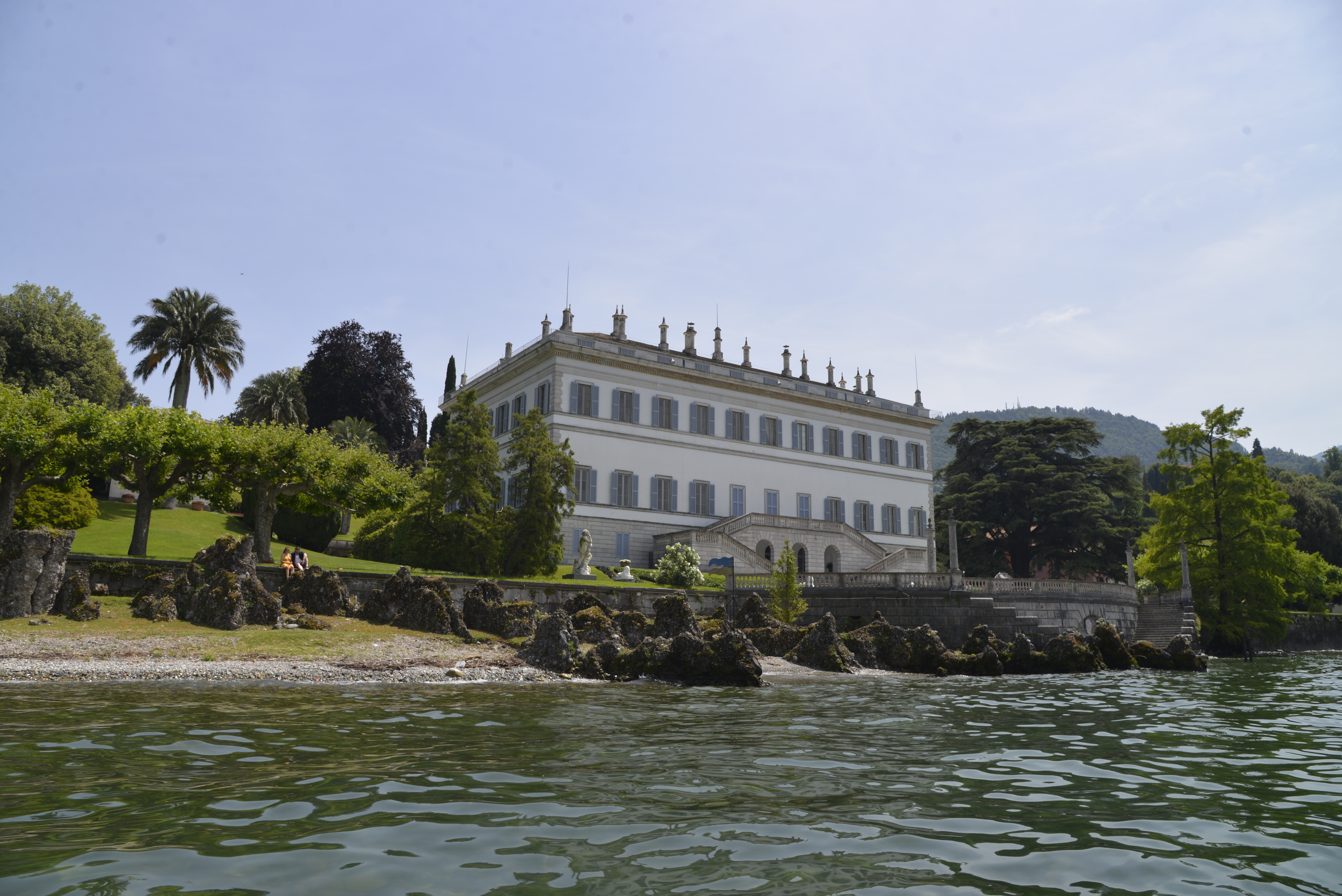

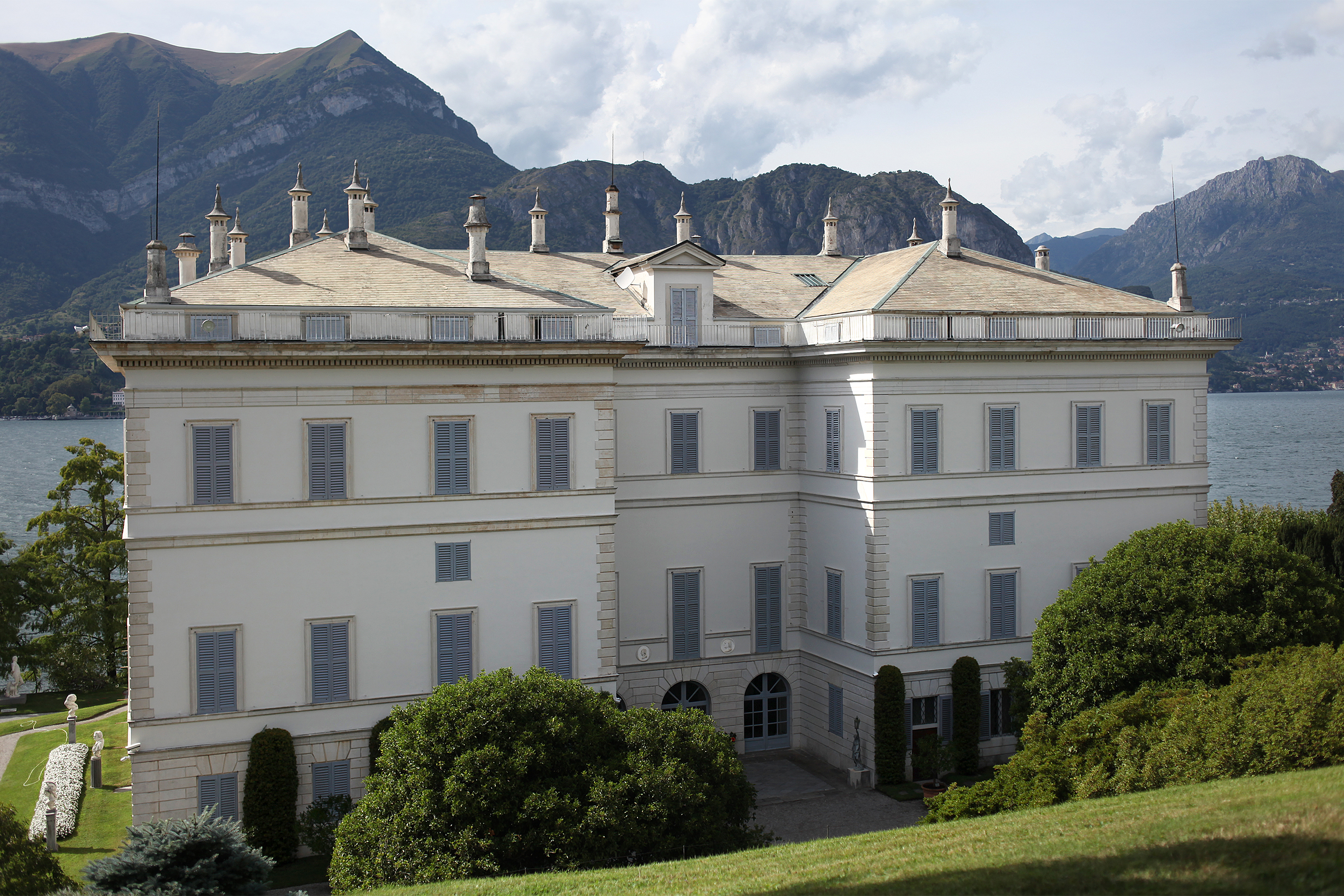

== See also ==
- Villa del Balbianello
- Villa Bernasconi
- Villa Carlotta
- Villa Erba
- Villa d'Este, Cernobbio
- Villa Monastero
- Villa Olmo
- Villa Serbelloni
- Villa Vigoni
