= Villa Carlotta =

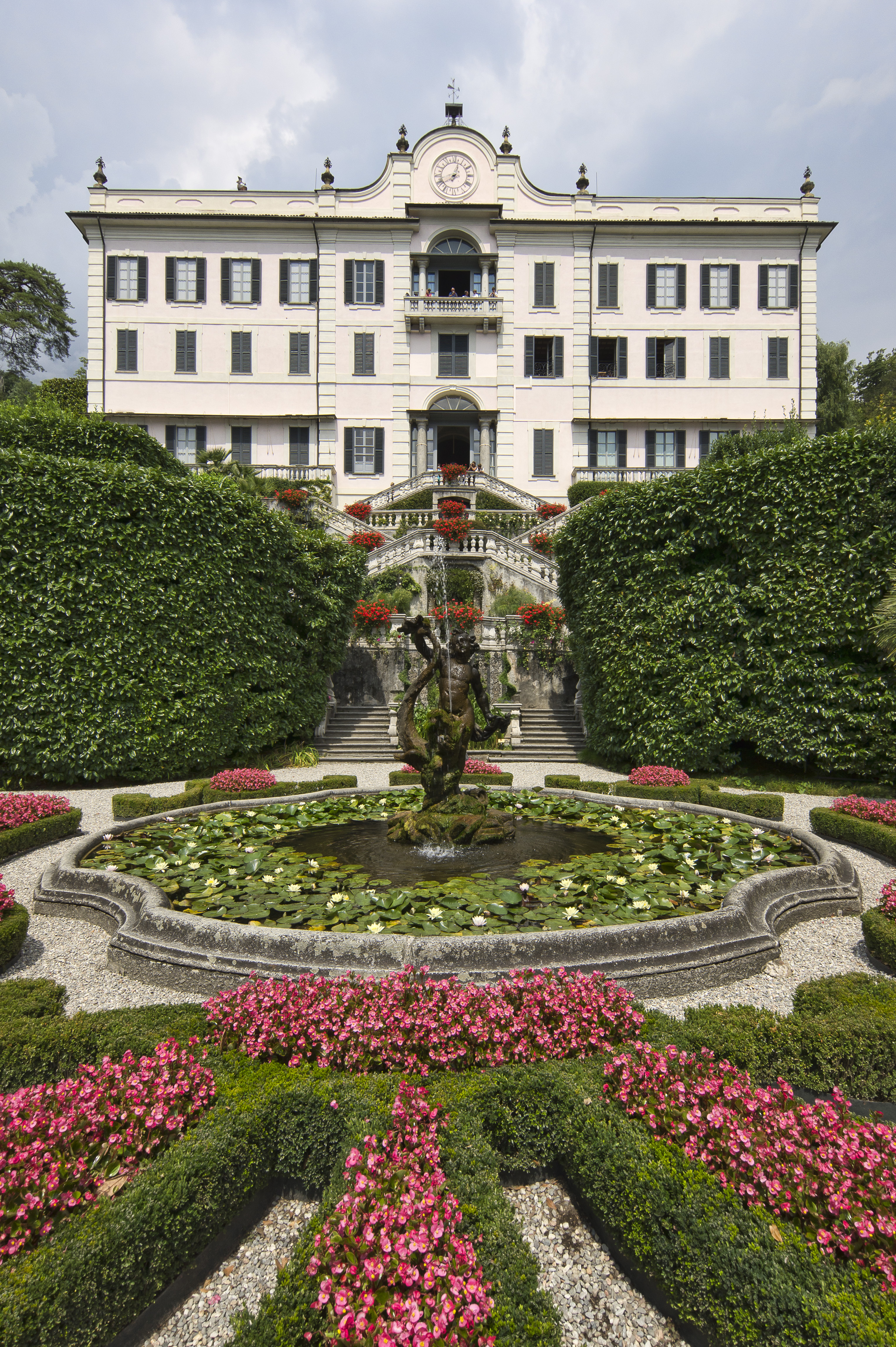
- Villa Carlotta in Tremezzo
- Click on the map for a fullscreen view

General information
- Location: Tremezzo, Italy
- Coordinates: 45°59′11.00″N 9°13′51.30″E

Villa Carlotta is a villa and botanical garden in Tremezzo on Lake Como in Northern Italy. Today the villa is a museum, whose collection includes works by sculptors such as Antonio Canova, Bertel Thorvaldsen, and Giovanni Migliara; painters such as Francesco Hayez; and furniture pieces of previous owners. The villa, whose architect is unknown, was completed in 1745.

== History ==
=== Clerici family ===
The Clerici family rose from rural origins in the northern region of Lake Como to become successful silk merchants due to the efforts of Giorgio (1575-1660) and his sons Pietro Antonio (1599-1675), who was made a Marquis, and Carlo (1615-1677) who became the owner of numerous palaces in Milan and Brianza.

Carlo's son, the Milanese marquis Giorgio Clerici, became a senator in 1684 and was nominated in 1717 to be President of the Senate. In 1690, he decided to establish a country estate on ancestral lakeside land at Tremezzo. The estate was complete in its initial form by 1695, and the garden was first mentioned in 1699.

Upon the death of Giorgio Clerici, his great-grandson Anton Giorgio Clerici (1715-1768) inherited the family fortune, and completed the villa in 1745. He died after having dissipated nearly all of his fortune building the Palazzo Clerici in Milan, forcing his heirs to sell their Lake Como property.

=== Sommariva ===
In 1801, Anton Giorgio's only daughter, Claudia Caterina Clerici (the wife of Count Vitaliano Bigli), sold the property to Giovanni Battista Sommariva, a banker and politician who had risen from barber's apprentice to a position of power in Napoleon Bonaparte's government in Northern Italy. In 1802, he was a candidate for vice president of the Republic of Italy, but Napoleon selected Francesco Melzi d'Eril for the post instead. With his political career thwarted, Sommariva retired from public life and devoted his time to collecting art.

Sommariva modified the villa to bring it in line with early 19th-century taste, adding balconies to take in the lake view and installing a large clock on the facade, He commissioned works from artists, including the sculptors Antonio Canova and Bertel Thorwaldsen, and the painter Francesco Fidanza, whose works feature in the villa today. He built a domed family chapel and a mausoleum near the lake shore, and transformed part of the park into a romantic garden in the English style. For a time the house was known as Villa Sommariva.

Because Sommariva's eldest son, Emilio, had died fighting in Spain in 1811, Sommariva's fortune was left to his second son, Luigi. After Luigi's death in 1838, the fortune (by then much diminished) was divided between his wife, Emilia Sommariva (a French noblewoman née Seillère) and numerous relatives.

=== Sachsen Meiningen ===
In 1843, Princess Marianna, the wife of Prince Albert of Prussia, bought the property for 780,000 lira, ten times the amount paid by Giovanni Sommariva forty years earlier. Emilia Sommariva relocated to a smaller house in Tremezzo, while reserving for herself ownership of the Sommariva family chapel and mausoleum on the grounds of the villa.

In 1847, Princess Marianne gave the property to her daughter Charlotte as a wedding present upon her marriage to Georg II, Duke of Saxe-Meiningen (1826-1914). The house was renamed Villa Carlotta, however, Charlotte enjoyed the villa for only a few years before she died in 1855 at the age of twenty-three of complications from childbirth.

In 1857, the author Ludwig Bechstein wrote a description of the villa which was published as Villa Carlotta. Poetische Reisebilder vom Comersee und aus den lombardisch-venetianischen Landen.

The Sachsen-Meiningens used the property as a private holiday home. While they didn't make substantial changes to the building, they sold part of the art collection that came with the property. Duke Georg, who had a passion for botany, dedicated himself to the development and enrichment of the garden, introducing a great variety of rare and exotic species. The Duke was a patron of the composer Johannes Brahms, who visited the villa at the Duke's invitation several times in the 1880s. Duke Georg died in 1914 at the outbreak of World War I.

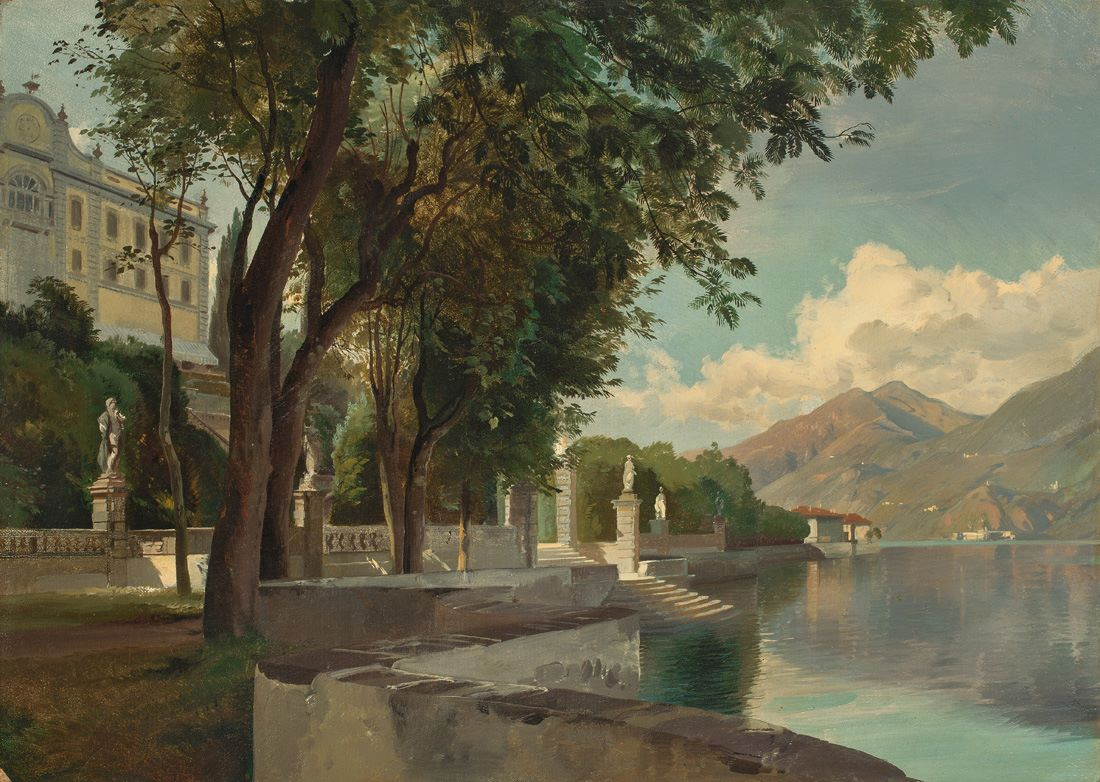
Die Villa Carlotta am Comer See by Carl Hummel (1855)

=== Public ownership ===
After Italy entered World War I in May 1915 on the side of the Allies, the Italian state declined to confiscate the villa, as it had other properties of enemy aliens in Italy, but rather placed it, on 15 August 1915, under the management of an administrator. During the war, the interest of the owners was exercised by the Swiss Consulate.

In 1921, the financial administrator of Como Province informed the owners that the entire property was now the property of the Italian state arguing that the villa was of eminent national significance. It was proposed in 1922 that the villa would be sold at auction. However local enthusiasts led by Senator Giuseppe Bianchini and the Rotary Club of Milan opposed this, which led to the villa being entrusted to the care of the Ente Villa Carlotta, a charitable foundation constituted by royal decree on 12 May 1927. This foundation is still responsible for the villa.

== Description ==
The villa and surrounding grounds are located on the lakeshore at Tremezzo, facing the Bellagio peninsula. An Italian garden with steps, fountains and sculptures was laid out at the same time.

=== The villa ===
The villa is located at the top of a terraced garden, from which there are views of Bellagio and also the mountains surrounding the lake. It consists of three floors (two of which are open to the public). The works of art on display are mainly located on the lower floor, while the upper one, which has an elegant gallery, provides views over the lake.

Among the sculptures on display in the villa are:

- Eros and Psyche by Adamo Tadolini. This is a marble copy taken from the original model used by Antonio Canova for the sculpture commissioned by Prince Nikolay Yusupov (and today at the Hermitage Museum in St. Petersburg). This copy arrived at the villa in 1834.
- Mars and Venus by Luigi Acquisti. Dating from 1805 this is considered to be his masterpiece.
- The original plaster model of The Muse Terpsichore by Antonio Canova. The sculpture was commissioned by Sommariva in 1811.
- Palamedes by Antonio Canova. Sommariva commissioned this sculpture from Canova, but in 1805, when it was still in Canova's atelier in Rome, the Tevere River flooded the workshop and broke it into several pieces. Canova personally restored it, between 1806 and 1808. The sculpture arrived at the villa in 1819.
- Repentant Magdalene. This is a copy produced by Canova's school of the original sculpture by Canova. Sommariva was also the owner of the original work.
- The Entrance of Alexander the Great in Babylonia by Bertel Thorvaldsen. This work was originally designed in stucco for the Quirinale Palace in Rome to mark the occasion of Napoleon's visit. Completed in June 1812, it was so admired that Napoleon ordered a marble replica for the Pantheon in Paris. Napoleon's fall from power caused work to stop until in 1818 Sommariva decided to have it completed. The 33 marble slabs of the frieze arrived in the villa between 1818 and 1828. The last two characters at the end of the frieze are a self-portrait of Thorvaldsen and a portrait of Sommariva.

As well as paintings by Andrea Appiani and Giovanni Migliara there are also:

- The Last Adieu of Romeo and Juliet by Francesco Hayez. This painting was commissioned by Sommariva in 1823.
- The Reading of the VIth Book of the Aeneid by Jean-Baptiste Wicar. This large oil painting was commissioned by Sommariva in 1818. Before arriving at the villa it was exhibited with great success in Milan in 1821.

In addition, the villa is home to a collection of more than 470 plaster cameos created by the Roman artist Giovanni Liberotti and a large silk and wool tapestry by François Van der Borght.

=== The garden ===
The botanical garden covers an area of about 8 ha (20 acres)and consists of several different sections. Immediately around the villa, towards the lake, the Italian garden with cut hedges and pergolas with orange and camellia trees. The rhododendron and 150 varieties of azalea spread up the slope. The property is also home to cedars, palms, redwoods, plane trees and other exotic plants. there is also a bamboo garden, covering 3000 m^{2} which is home to over 25 different bamboo species. A greenhouse which had been used in the past to house citrus fruits during winter has been converted into a museum of old farm tools.

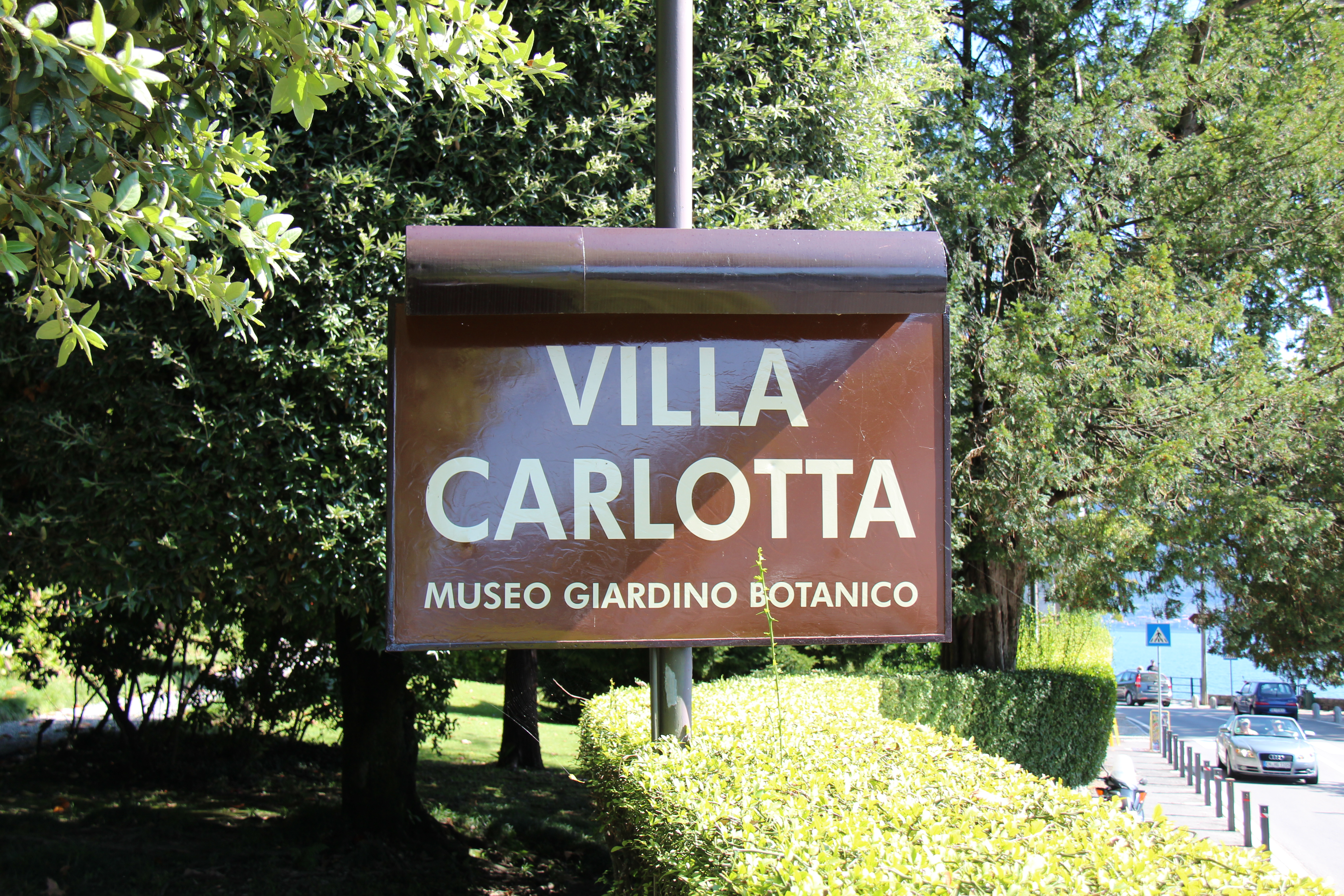

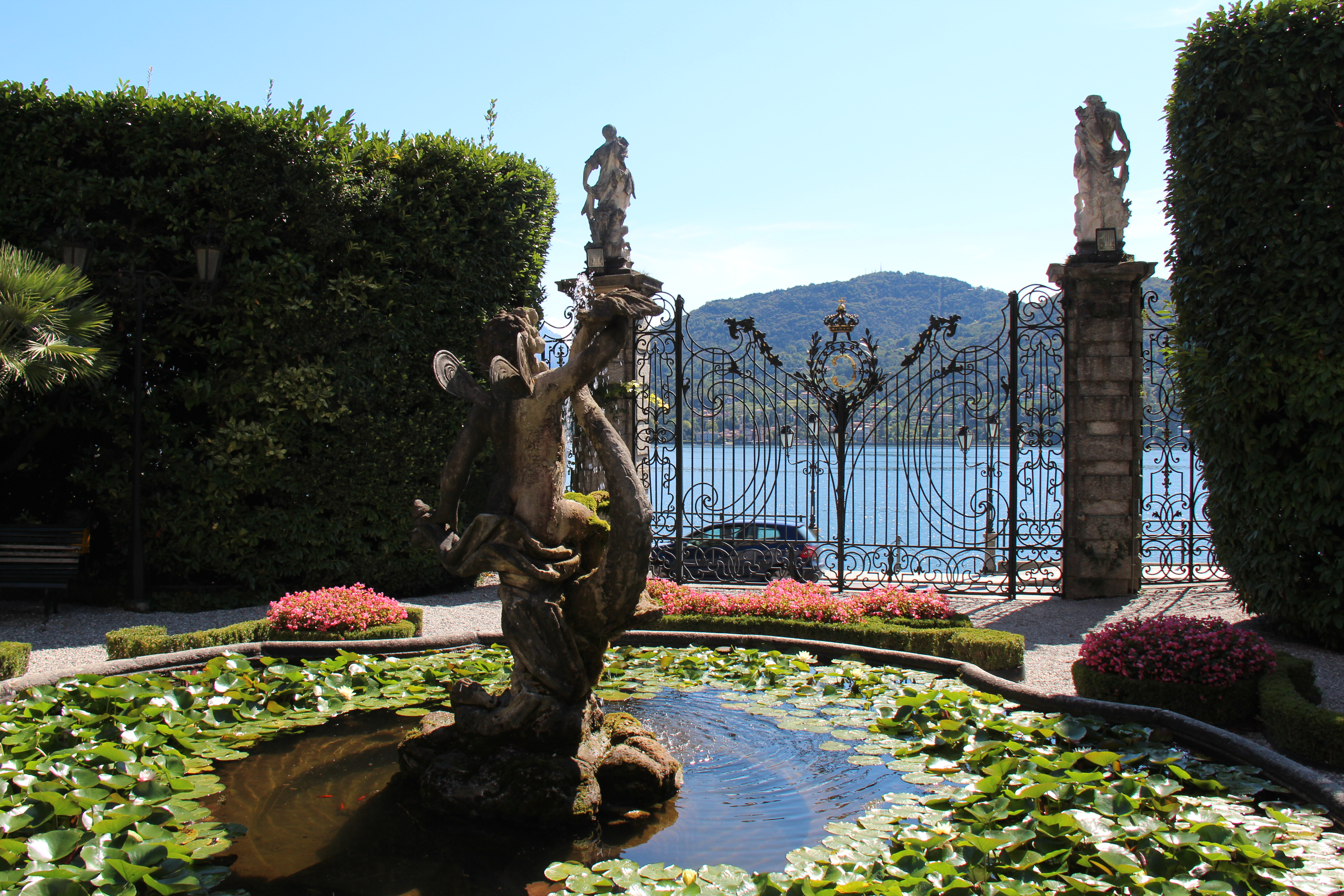

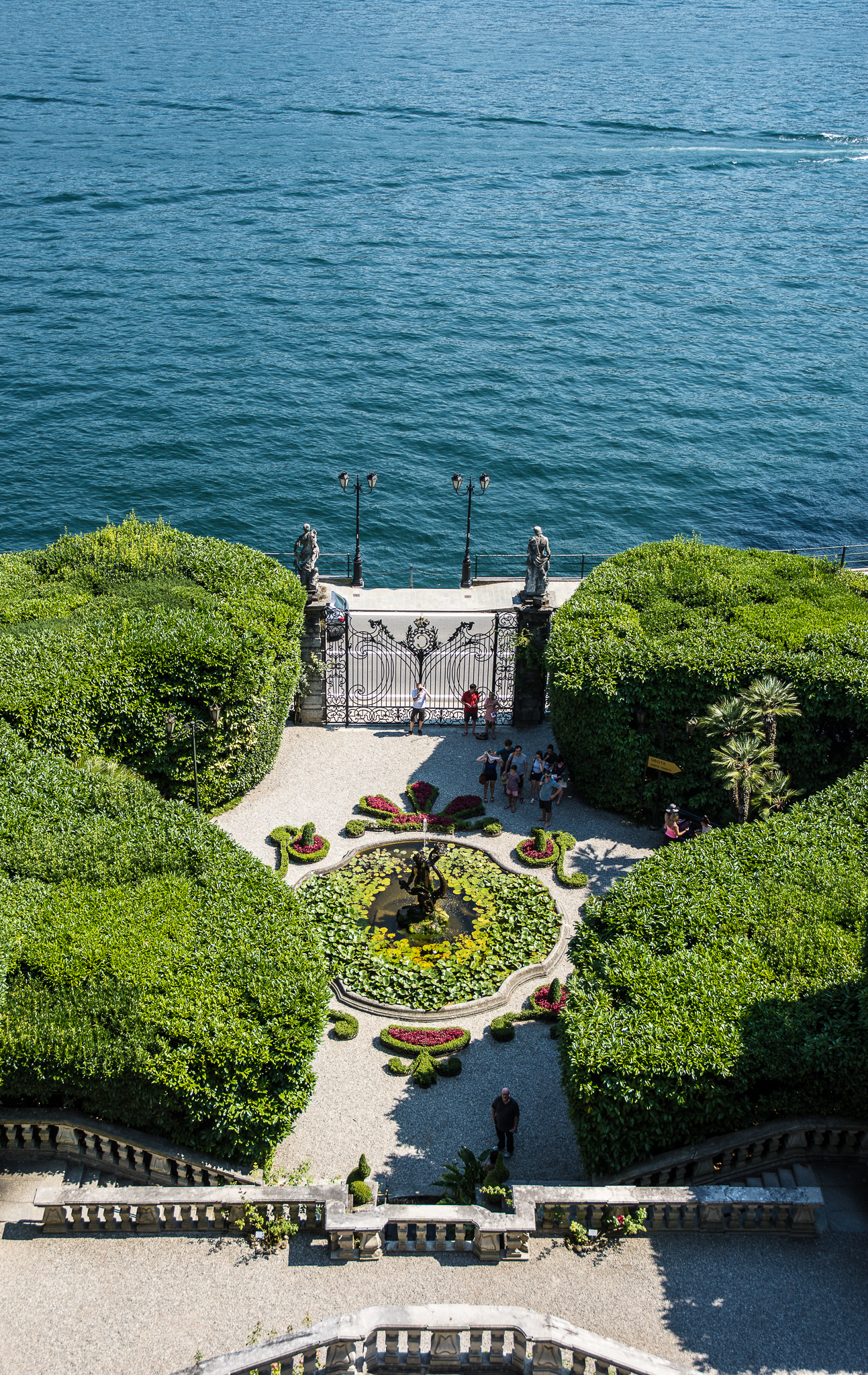

== See also ==
- Villa del Balbianello
- Villa Bernasconi
- Villa Erba
- Villa d'Este, Cernobbio
- Villa Melzi
- Villa Monastero
- Villa Olmo
- Villa Serbelloni
- Villa Vigoni
