= Villa Erba =

Villa in Cernobbio, Italy

Coordinates: 45°50′21″N 9°4′28″E

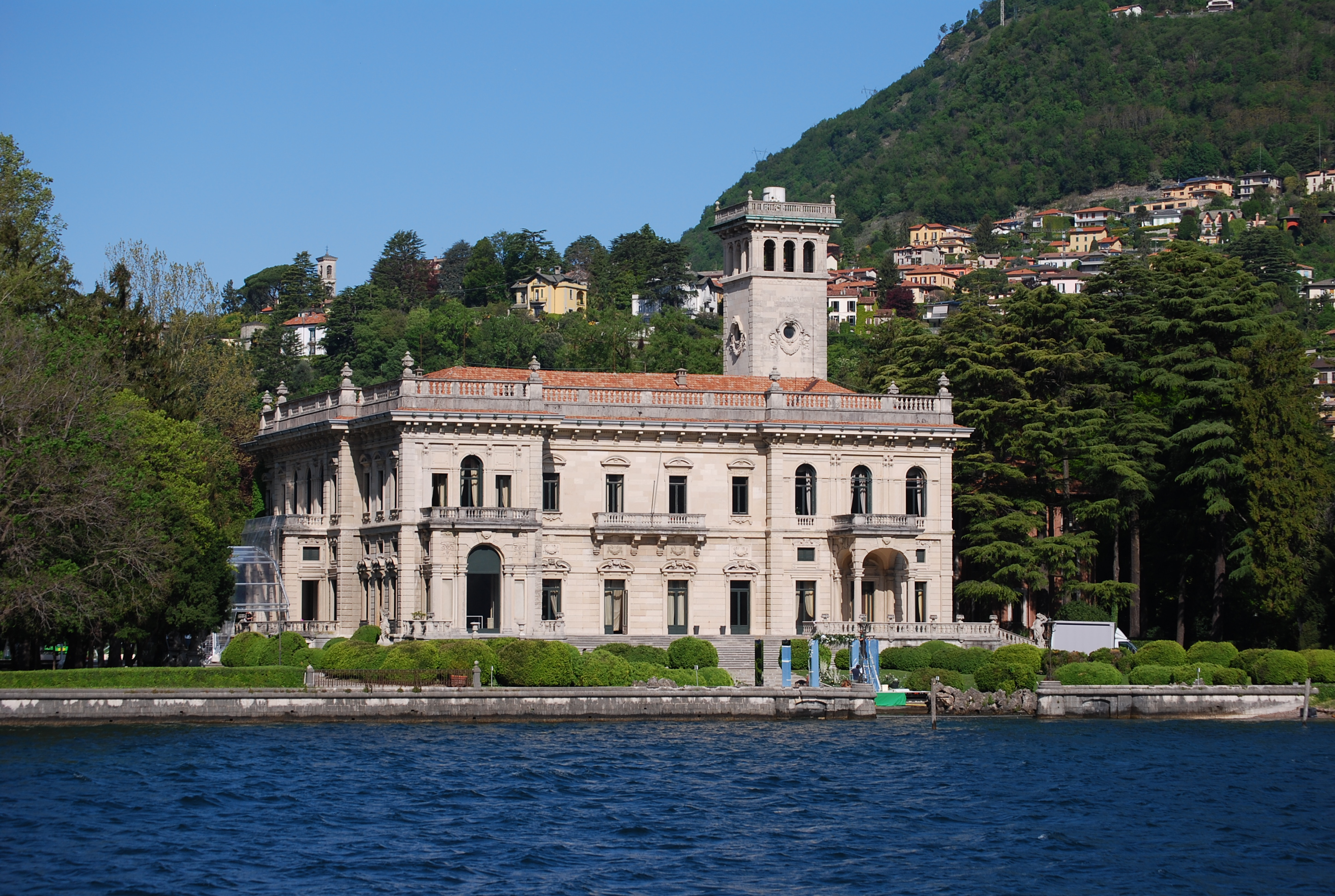
- Exterior view of the villa in 2009

General information
- Architectural style: Classic
- Location: Cernobbio, Italy

Website
- villaerba.it

Villa Erba is a 19th-century villa in Cernobbio, on the western shore of Lake Como in northern Italy. Its location is not far from the Villa d'Este luxury hotel in Cernobbio.

The villa was built by Luigi Erba, brother of the prominent Italian businessman Carlo Erba (founder of the Erba pharmaceutical company), to express his grandiosity. After the death of Luigi Erba, the villa was inherited by his daughter Carla (1880–1939) and was used by members of her family, including her son Luchino Visconti.

In 1986, the property was bought by a public consortium to use as an exposition and congress center.

== In popular culture ==
In 2004, the building and grounds were used as a filming location for the movie Ocean's Twelve, serving as the villa of a gentleman thief named François Toulour.

In early 2005, American singer Gwen Stefani shot the music video for her 2005 single, Cool, on the villa's grounds. During the same year, a leg of Anastacia's Live at Last Tour was hosted in the villa's park.

Villa Erba is used in the 2025 action movie The Old Guard 2 for its first action sequence. It is depicted as a villa in Split, Croatia, which the hero team raids because they suspect a weapons cache there.

In 2025 Villa Erba was used for the Swiss-Italien TV mini series crime drama „ La Linea della Palma“ („Das Caravaggio-Komplott“ in German) as Residenz for the duchess.

== See also ==
- Villa del Balbianello
- Villa Bernasconi
- Villa Carlotta
- Villa d'Este, Cernobbio
- Villa Melzi
- Villa Monastero
- Villa Olmo
- Villa Serbelloni
- Villa Vigoni
