= Bellagio, Lombardy =

Municipality in Lombardy, Italy

Bellagio Belàs (Lombard)
- Comune
- Comune di Bellagio
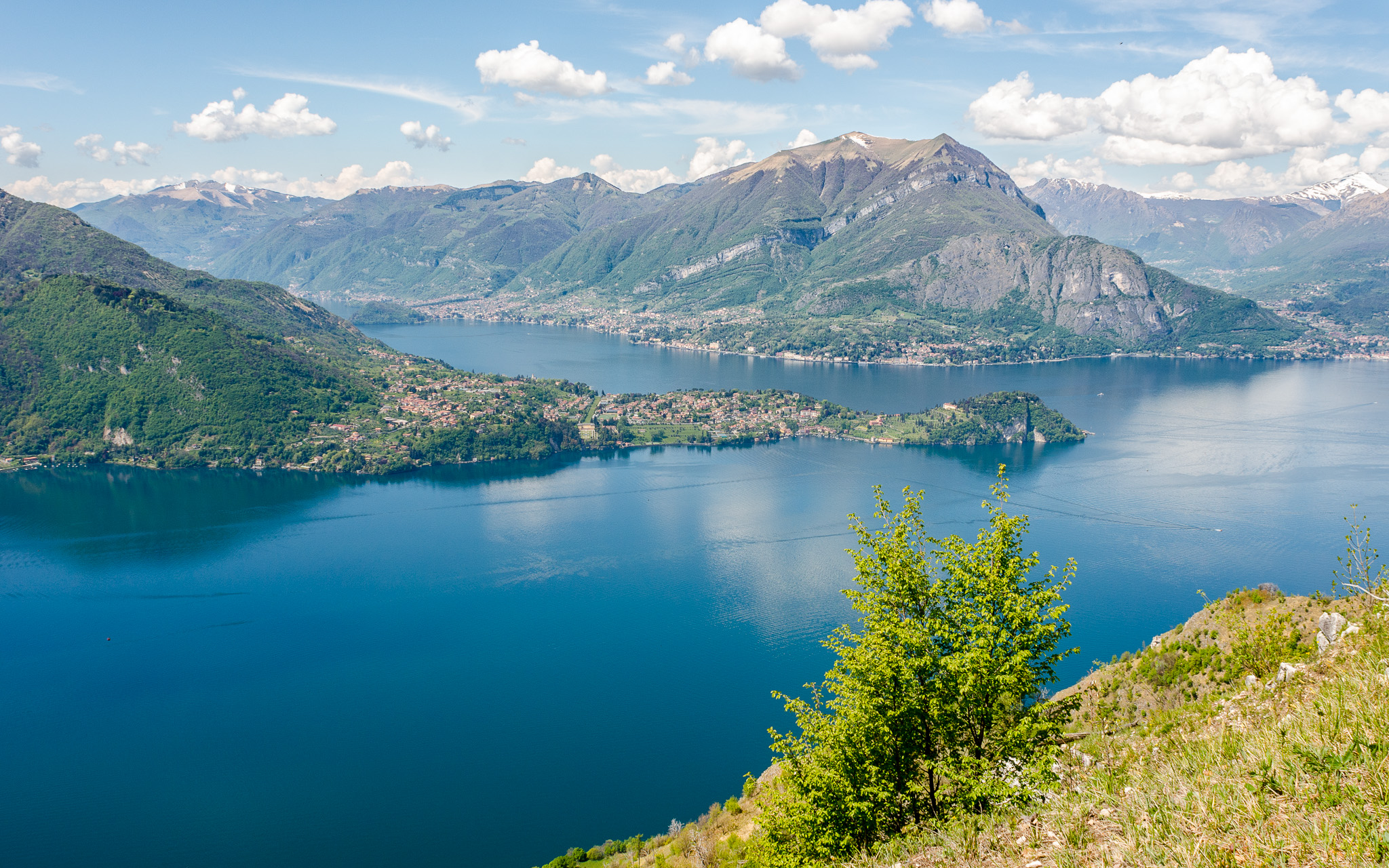
- Bellagio, on peninsula in center

- Location within Italy Location within Lombardy
- Coordinates: 45°59′N 09°15′E
- Country: Italy
- Region: Lombardy
- Province: Como (CO)
- Frazioni: Aureggio, Begola, Borgo, Breno, Brogno, Cagnanica, Casate, Cascine Gallasco, Cassinott, Cernobbio, Chevrio, Civenna, Costaprada, Crotto, Guello, Guggiate, Loppia, Makallé, Neer, Oliverio, Paum, Pescallo, Piano Rancio, Prà Filippo, Regatola, Rovenza, San Giovanni, San Primo, San Vito, Scegola, Suira, Taronico, Vergonese, Visgnola

Government
  - Mayor: Angelo Barindelli

Area
  - Total: 26 km^{2} (10 sq mi)
- Elevation: 229 m (751 ft)

Population (31 August 2013)
  - Total: 3,820
  - Density: 150/km^{2} (380/sq mi)
- Demonym(s): Bellagini (it.); Belagìn (west.lmo.)
- Time zone: UTC+1 (CET)
  - Summer (DST): UTC+2 (CEST)
- Postal code: 22021
- Dialing code: 031
- Patron saint: Saint James
- Saint day: July 25
- Website: www.comune.bellagio.co.it

Bellagio (Italian: [belˈlaːdʒo]; Comasco: Belàs [beˈlaːs]) is a comune (municipality) in the Province of Como in the Lombardy region of Italy. It is situated on Lake Como, known also by its Latin name Lario, where the lake's two southern arms branch, creating the Triangolo lariano. Bellagio's location at the tip of this promontory, looking out across the lake's northern arm towards the Alps, has long been noted for its scenic beauty. Bellagio is part of the Comunità montana del Triangolo lariano, headquartered in Canzo.

== History ==
=== Early history ===
Traces of human presence around Bellagio date back to the Paleolithic period, approximately 30,000 years ago. Around the 7th to 5th centuries BC, a castellum (fortified hilltop settlement) may have existed on the promontory, potentially serving as a place of worship and trade for the scattered villages around the lake.

From around 400 BC, the Insubres, a Celtic tribe, are identified as the first inhabitants of the Bellagio area. They occupied the western shore of Lake Como up to its central point. The Orobii inhabited the northern arm of the lake and its eastern bank. The Insubres maintained their independence until the arrival of the Gauls led by Belloveso around 600 BC. The Gauls subjugated the Insubres, establishing themselves in Milan and Como, and garrisoning Bellagio as the northernmost point of their territory. This Gallo-Insubrian culture blended with the existing population, leaving traces in local place names such as Crux Galli (now Grosgalla) near Lezzeno, and Gallo, a small chapel on the old road to Limonta marking the border between municipalities.

=== Roman era ===
In 225 BC, the Romans began their expansion northward, leading to the occupation of Gallo-Insubrian territory. Roman forces under Consul Marcus Claudius Marcellus defeated the Gallo-Insubres near Camerlata, taking control of Como and Lake Como's shores. During the Second Punic War, the Insubres briefly allied with Hannibal in hopes of regaining independence, but their aspirations were quashed by defeat in 194 BC, and the territory was fully incorporated into a Roman province by 80 BC.

Bellagio became a Roman garrison and a transit point for Roman armies heading to Raetia and the Splügen Pass. Troops overwintered near present-day Villa Serbelloni, benefiting from shelter from northerly winds and the area's mild climate. The Latin names Belacius and Bislacus suggest a possible origin in "Bi-lacus" ("between the lakes").

Between 81 and 77 BC, Cornelius Scipio established a colony of 3,000 Latin settlers around Lake Como. Julius Caesar, as proconsul from 59 BC, further augmented the population with 5,000 colonists, including 500 Greeks from Sicily. These diverse origins contributed to Bellagio's evolving ethnic makeup. Its strategic importance grew, serving not only as a wintering location but also as a harbor for warships, particularly at Loppia, where a natural inlet facilitated repairs. Loppia developed into one of Bellagio's earliest suburbs.

The Romans introduced Mediterranean crops such as olives and bay laurel. The Latin name for bay laurel, Laurus, is believed to be the origin of Lake Como's Latin name, Larius. Other introductions included the chestnut, cypress, and various herbaceous plants.

During the early Roman Empire, Virgil and Pliny the Younger brought renown to Lake Como and Bellagio. Virgil mentioned "great Lario" in his Georgics. Pliny the Younger maintained a summer villa, known as "Tragedy", near Bellagio's summit, where he spent extended periods studying, writing, hunting, and fishing, as documented in his letters regarding his Bellagio villas.

In 9 AD, Roman legions, including soldiers from Bellagio's garrison, passed through Bellagio under Publius Quinctilius Varus on their way to Germany via the Splügen Pass. These legions were later annihilated in the Battle of the Teutoburg Forest.

=== Middle Ages ===
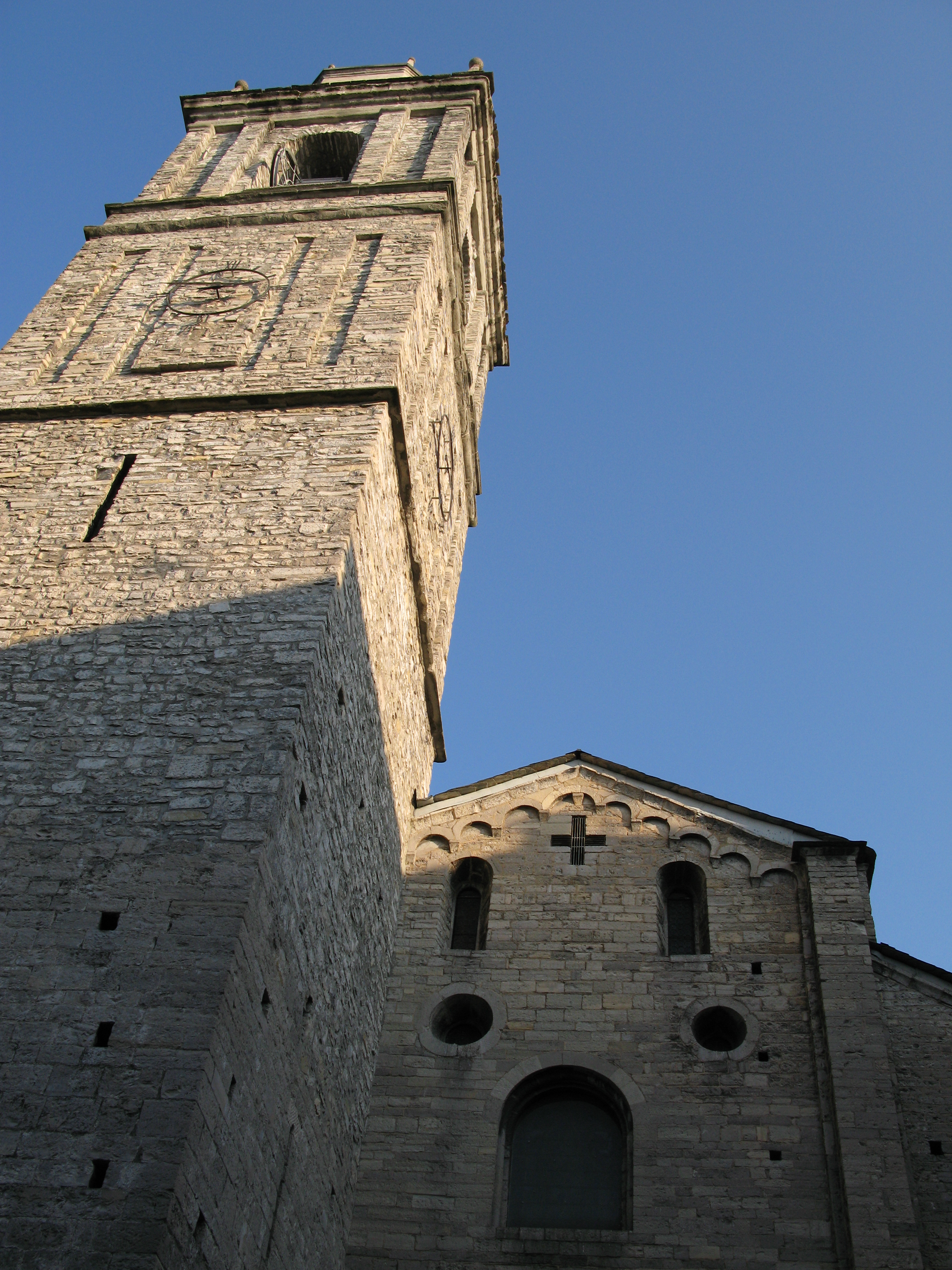
The Basilica of St. James (San Giacomo), built by 12th-century artisans from Como.

During the Migration Period, Narses, a general serving Emperor Justinian I, established a defensive line along Lake Como against the Goths. This line included fortifications at Bellagio, Isola Comacina, and Castel Baradello.

Around 568, the Lombards under Alboin invaded the Po Valley and settled in Lombardy, including the Alpine valleys and lake regions. Bellagio's fortress was also occupied. In 744, Lombard King Liutprand resided there.

The Franks under Charlemagne entered Piedmont and Lombardy, defeating the Lombards at the Battle of Pavia in 773. Lombard territory was divided into counties, marking the beginning of feudalism. Bellagio became part of the County of Milan under Frankish rule.

In 834, Lothair I, grandson of Charlemagne, granted feudal lordship of Limonta and Civenna to the monks of Saint Ambrose of Milan, along with Campione d'Italia. Residents of Limonta and Civenna, later part of Bellagio's parish of St. John, were obligated to provide produce (olive oil, chestnuts, etc.) to the monks for centuries.

The Ottonian dynasty of Germany followed. During the reign of Henry V, a decade-long war (1117–1127) erupted over the Bishopric of Como. Milan supported a bishop appointed by the German Emperor, while Como favored Guido Grimoldi, consecrated by the Pope. Bellagio, allied with Milan, Isola Comacina, and Gravedona, contributed its fleet to the conflict, which involved numerous skirmishes on land and water. The war concluded with the destruction of Como and its subjugation to Milan. By 1100, Bellagio may have already been a free commune with its own tribunal, with only nominal dependence on Como. However, Bellagio's strategic location made it a target for Como, leading to incursions and naval battles. In 1154, under Frederick Barbarossa, Bellagio was compelled to pledge loyalty and pay tribute to Como.

Following the destruction of Milan by Frederick Barbarossa in 1162, Como attacked Isola Comacina in 1169, devastating it and forcing inhabitants to seek refuge in Varenna and Bellagio, considered strongholds at the time. Bellagio joined the Lombard League, allying with Milan against Barbarossa and Como, and participated in the Battle of Legnano in 1176.

=== Renaissance and Baroque periods ===
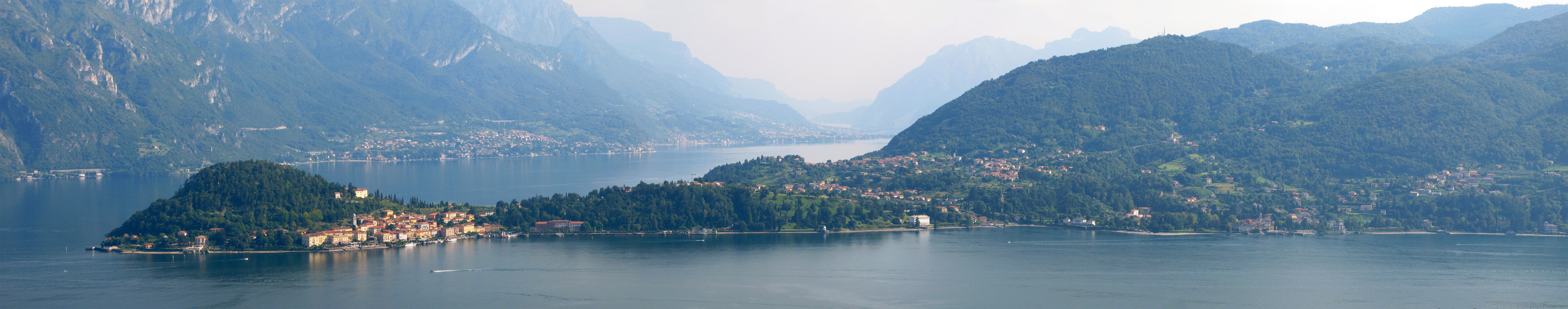
The promontory of Bellagio seen from the belvedere of the Sanctuary of San Martino at Griante on the Como arm of the lake. Villa Serbelloni is the white building on the hillside. Villa Melzi d'Eril is visible along the shore to the right.

Towards the end of the 13th century, Bellagio, previously aligned with the Ghibellines, became part of the dominion of the House of Visconti and was incorporated into the Duchy of Milan.

In 1440, during Visconti rule, residents of Cernobbio attacked Bellagio's prison, freeing political prisoners who then fled into the Bellagio mountains and founded a settlement named Cernobbio, commemorating their origin.

Upon the death of Filippo Maria Visconti, Visconti power waned. The Golden Ambrosian Republic briefly governed the area (1447–1450) until Milan surrendered to Francesco Sforza, who became Duke of Milan and Lombardy. Bellagio, occupied by Sforza's troops in 1449 during the succession war, was among the first towns on the lake to support Sforza rule.

In 1508, under Ludovico il Moro (1479–1508), the estate of Bellagio was transferred from the Bishop of Como to the Marquis of Stanga, a treasurer, ambassador, and confidant of il Moro. Stanga constructed a new villa on Bellagio hill, later destroyed in a raid by the Cavargnoni.

In 1535, with the death of Francesco II Sforza, the last Sforza Duke of Milan, Lombardy and the Lake Como region came under Spanish rule for two centuries, the era depicted in Alessandro Manzoni's novel The Betrothed. The Derta steps, connecting Guggiate and Suira, were built during Spanish rule.

In 1533, Francesco Sfondrati, through marriage to a Visconti, acquired the fiefdom of Bellagio. For over 200 years, the Sfondrati family, prominent in Milanese society, governed Bellagio. Francesco Sfondrati and later Ercole Sfondrati, who retired to the villa in his later years to pursue religious devotion, renovated the ruins of Villa Stanga. Ercole also built the church and convent of the Capuchins in 1614 on the peninsula, investing significantly in landscaping with cypress trees and sweet olive trees.

Bellagio's strategic location fostered the growth of small industries, notably candle-making and silk weaving, supported by silkworm cultivation and mulberry trees. In 1788, upon the death of Carlo Sfondrati, the last of his line, Bellagio passed to Count Alessandro Serbelloni, becoming Serbelloni Sfondrati.

=== 18th and 19th centuries ===
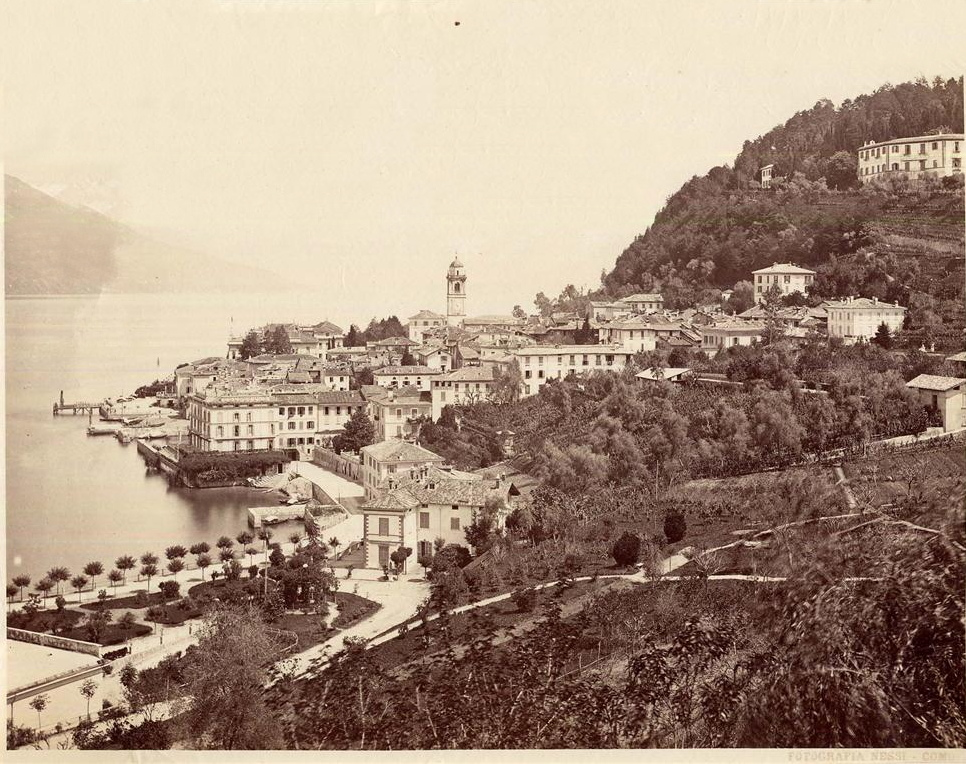
Bellagio in the late 19th century.

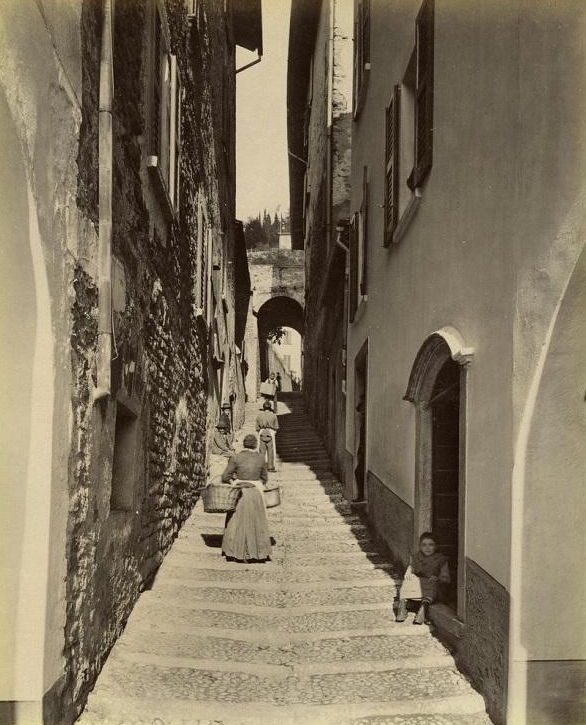
The Via del Monastero, a typical Bellagio alleyway at the end of the 19th century

During the brief Napoleonic era, Bellagio's port gained military and strategic importance. A decision that significantly shaped Bellagio's future was Count Francesco Melzi d'Eril, Duke of Lodi and Vice President of the Cisalpine Republic, choosing Bellagio for his summer residence. Melzi constructed Villa Melzi on the western shore near Loppia, attracting Milanese nobility and transforming the promontory into a fashionable social hub. Carriage roads were built, initially connecting villas and palaces, then extending to the town center, and finally the provincial road Erba–Bellagio was completed. Bellagio's reputation as a lakeside resort spread beyond the Kingdom of Lombardy–Venetia. Emperor Francis I of Austria visited in 1816 and returned in 1825, staying at Villas Serbelloni, Trotti, and Melzi.

The Romantic movement's appreciation of landscape influenced perceptions of the Italian lakes. Stendhal first visited in 1810, writing:

What can one say about Lake Maggiore, about the Borromean Islands, about Lake Como, unless it be that one pities those who are not madly in love with them ... the sky is pure, the air mild, and one recognises the land beloved of the gods, the happy land that neither barbarous invasions nor civil discords could deprive of its heaven-sent blessings.

While staying at Villa Melzi, Stendhal wrote:

I isolate myself in a room on the second floor; there, I lift my gaze to the most beautiful view in the world, after the Gulf of Naples ...

Franz Liszt and his mistress Comtesse Marie d'Agoult spent four months in Bellagio in 1837, en route from Switzerland to Como and Milan. In Bellagio, Liszt composed piano pieces that became Album d'un voyageur (1835–38), inspired by the landscapes as seen through the eyes of Byron and Senancour. These works contributed to Bellagio's image as a Romantic destination. D'Agoult's letters suggest they were aware of foreshadowing the advent of mass tourism.

In 1838, Bellagio hosted Emperor Ferdinand I, Archduke Rainer, and Minister Metternich, who arrived from Varenna on the Lario, the first steamboat on Lake Como, launched in 1826. Bellagio became a favored location for Lombard nobility, leading to villa and garden construction. Luxury shops opened, and tourists frequented the lakeshore promenade. Due to limited space, the old port was partially covered to create a larger square extending to the arcades.

Gustav Flaubert visited Bellagio in 1845, noting in his travel diary:

One could live and die here. The outlook seems designed as a balm to the eyes. ... the horizon is lined with snow and the foreground alternates between the graceful and the rugged—a truly Shakespearean landscape, all the forces of nature are brought together, with an overwhelming sense of vastness.

=== Risorgimento and Kingdom of Italy ===
In 1859, during the Second Italian War of Independence, Garibaldi's Hunters of the Alps defeated Austrian forces at San Fermo, entering Como and bringing the province under Piedmontese rule. Bellagio became part of the Kingdom of Italy under the House of Savoy.

Tourism became Bellagio's primary economic activity. The first hotel, now the Hotel Metropole, originated in 1825 from the Abbondio Genazzini hostelry, becoming the Hotel Genazzini. Other hotels soon followed, many still operating and often family-run: Hotel Firenze (opened 1852), and Grand Hotel Bellagio (now Grand Hotel Villa Serbelloni, opened 1872). In 1888, the largest hotels (Genazzini, Grande Bretagne, and Grand Hotel Bellagio) adopted electric lighting, followed by many private residences. Bellagio became an international tourist destination, while maintaining its character and avoiding mass tourism.

=== 20th and 21st centuries ===
During the Italian Social Republic (RSI) from 1943 to 1945, Bellagio was part of this German-backed puppet state. Filippo Tommaso Marinetti, founder of Futurism and a supporter of Benito Mussolini, remained in the RSI as a propagandist until his death from a heart attack in Bellagio in December 1944.

Luchino Visconti featured Bellagio in a scene in his film Rocco and His Brothers (1960), set on the Europa Promenade. The scene, with the backdrop of older hotels, suggests a decline of past eras and the rise of mass tourism.

In 2014, Bellagio merged with the neighboring municipality of Civenna, retaining the name Bellagio for the unified entity.

== Geography ==
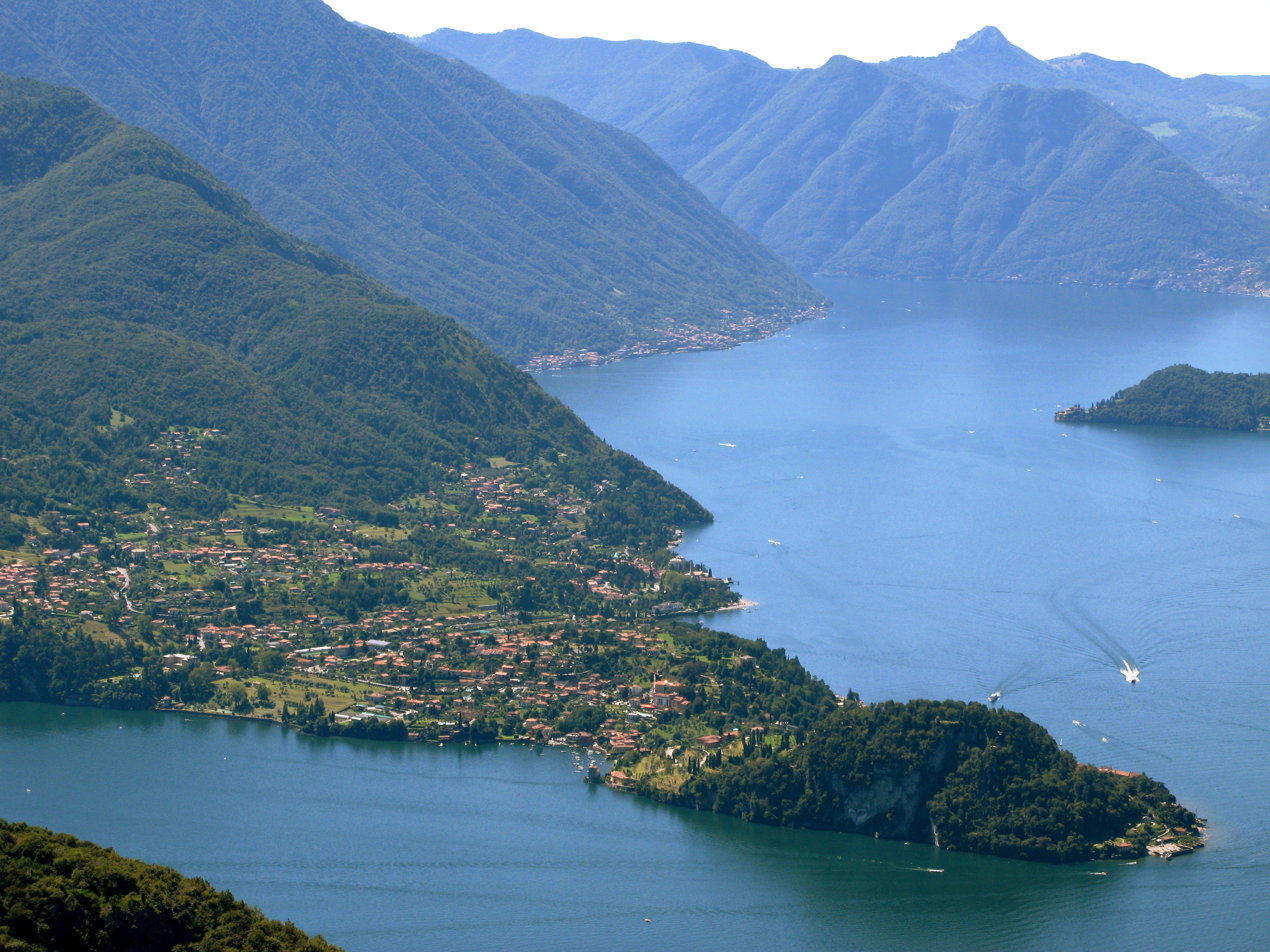
A view over Bellagio looking along the Como arm of the lake.

Bellagio is located at the tip of the promontory dividing Lake Como into its two southern branches. The town center occupies the promontory's point, with other areas extending along the lake shores and up the hillsides. The landscape was shaped by Pleistocene glaciations from the Valtellina and Valchiavenna valleys. Glaciers advanced as far south as Brianza at least four times. Only the highest peaks remained above the ice, including Mount St. Primo, which diverted glaciers into the two arms of the lake.

Today, Bellagio enjoys a mild climate that supports lush vegetation. Winter daytime temperatures rarely fall below 6 to 7 °C (43 to 45 °F), while summer temperatures average 25 to 28 °C (77 to 82 °F), moderated by the afternoon breva, a gentle lake breeze.

== Tourism ==
Bellagio, often called the Pearl of Lake Como, is known for its scenic beauty and historical significance as a tourist destination. Tourism is fundamental to Bellagio's economy, supporting local businesses and contributing to the preservation of its cultural heritage. The town's historic center and villas like Villa Serbelloni and Villa Melzi d'Eril attract visitors throughout the year. Bellagio's recognition extends beyond Italy and inspired the name of the Bellagio Resort & Casino in Las Vegas.

== Sights ==
=== Borgo ===
Bellagio's historic center, known as the Borgo, is situated 350 meters (1,150 ft) southwest of the promontory's tip, between Villa Serbelloni and the Como arm of the lake. A park and marina occupy the promontory's furthest point. Three streets, Mazzini, Centrale, and Garibaldi, run parallel to the shore in ascending order. Seven medieval stone stairways ("salite") intersect these streets, climbing uphill. The Basilica of San Giacomo and the Torre delle Arti Bellagio, a medieval tower, are located in a piazza at the top of the Borgo.

=== Churches ===
- Basilica di San Giacomo, located in Piazza della Chiesa, is a Lombard-Romanesque church dating from 1075–1125. The bell tower incorporates earlier town defenses, while its upper section is from the 18th century. The interior features a 12th-century cross, a 1432 triptych by Foppa, and a 16th-century altarpiece. Bar Sport, across the piazza, occupies a former monastery.
- Church of San Giorgio, adjacent to the town hall, was built between 1080 and 1120. It contains a statue and fresco of Our Lady of the Belt. The Genazzini Stairs pass under the bell tower to the public library.
- Church of San Martino, in Visgnola.
- Church of Sant'Antonio Abate, in Casate.
- Church of San Carlo Borromeo, in Aureggio.
- Church of San Biagio, in Pescallo.
- Church of Sant'Andrea, in Guggiate.

=== Villas ===
Bellagio's promontory is lined with historic villas, each with extensive parks and gardens. Villa Serbelloni and Villa Melzi d'Eril are open to the public.

==== Villa Serbelloni ====
Villa Serbelloni is located on the hill behind the promontory, sheltered from winds, dominating Bellagio's historic center. Accessible from Via Garibaldi, it was originally built in the 15th century on the site of a 1375 castle. Rebuilt multiple times, it passed to Alessandro Serbelloni in 1788, who enhanced it with 17th- and 18th-century decorations and art. Only the gardens are currently open to visitors. Paths lead to the remains of a 16th-century Capuchin monastery and the Sfondrata residence, built by the Sfondrati family overlooking the Lecco branch of the lake.

In contrast, the Grand Hotel Villa Serbelloni, a neoclassical villa built in the 1850s for a Milanese aristocratic family, stands on the waterfront. It became the Grand Hotel Bellagio in 1873, retaining its original Belle Époque interiors.

==== Villa Melzi d'Eril ====
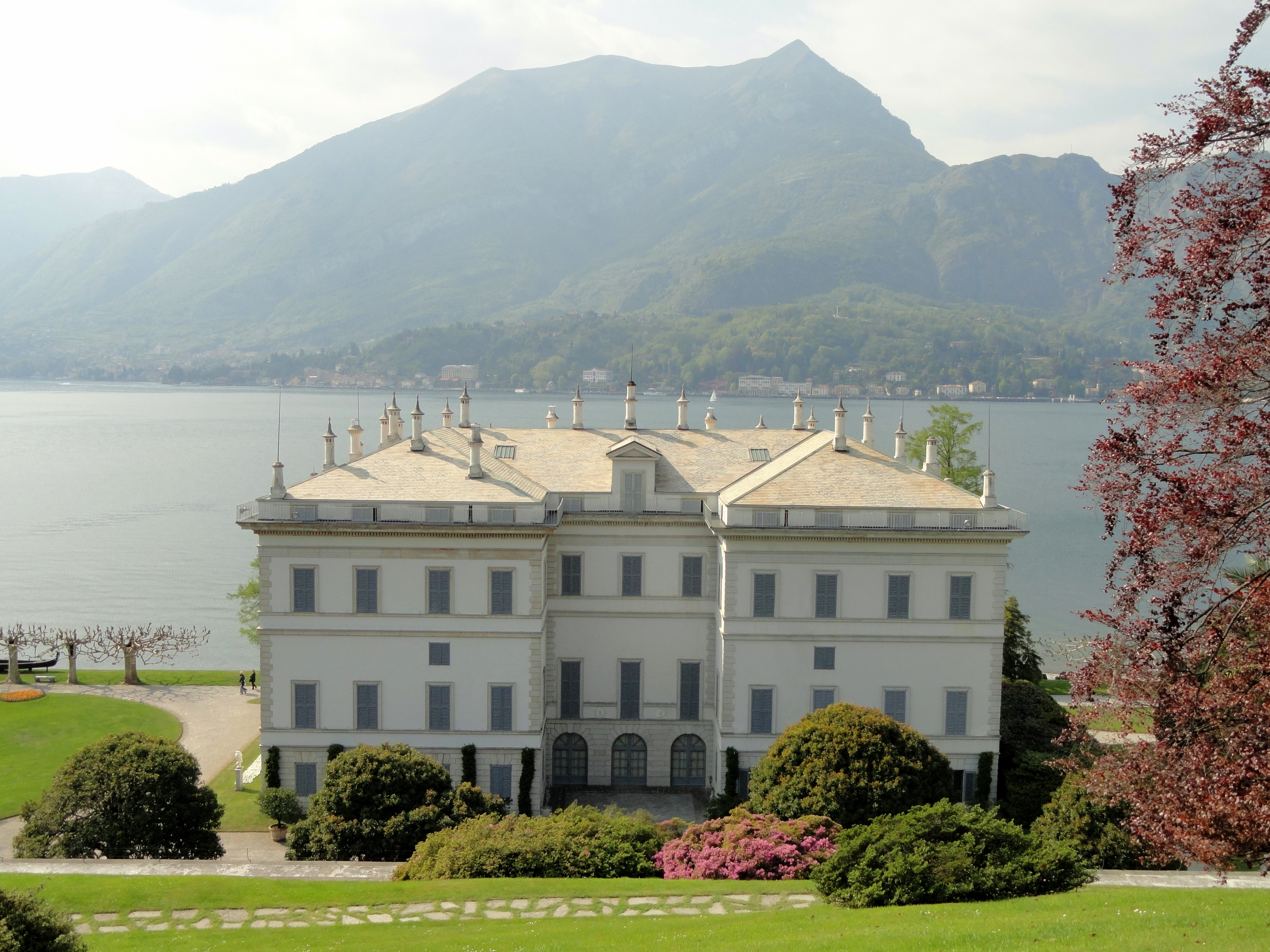
Villa Melzi d'Eril: the garden front

Villa Melzi d'Eril, overlooking the lake, was constructed between 1808 and 1815 by architect Giocondo Albertolli for Francesco Melzi d'Eril, Duke of Lodi, who served Napoleon as vice-president of the Italian Republic from 1802 and Chancellor of the Kingdom of Italy from 1805.

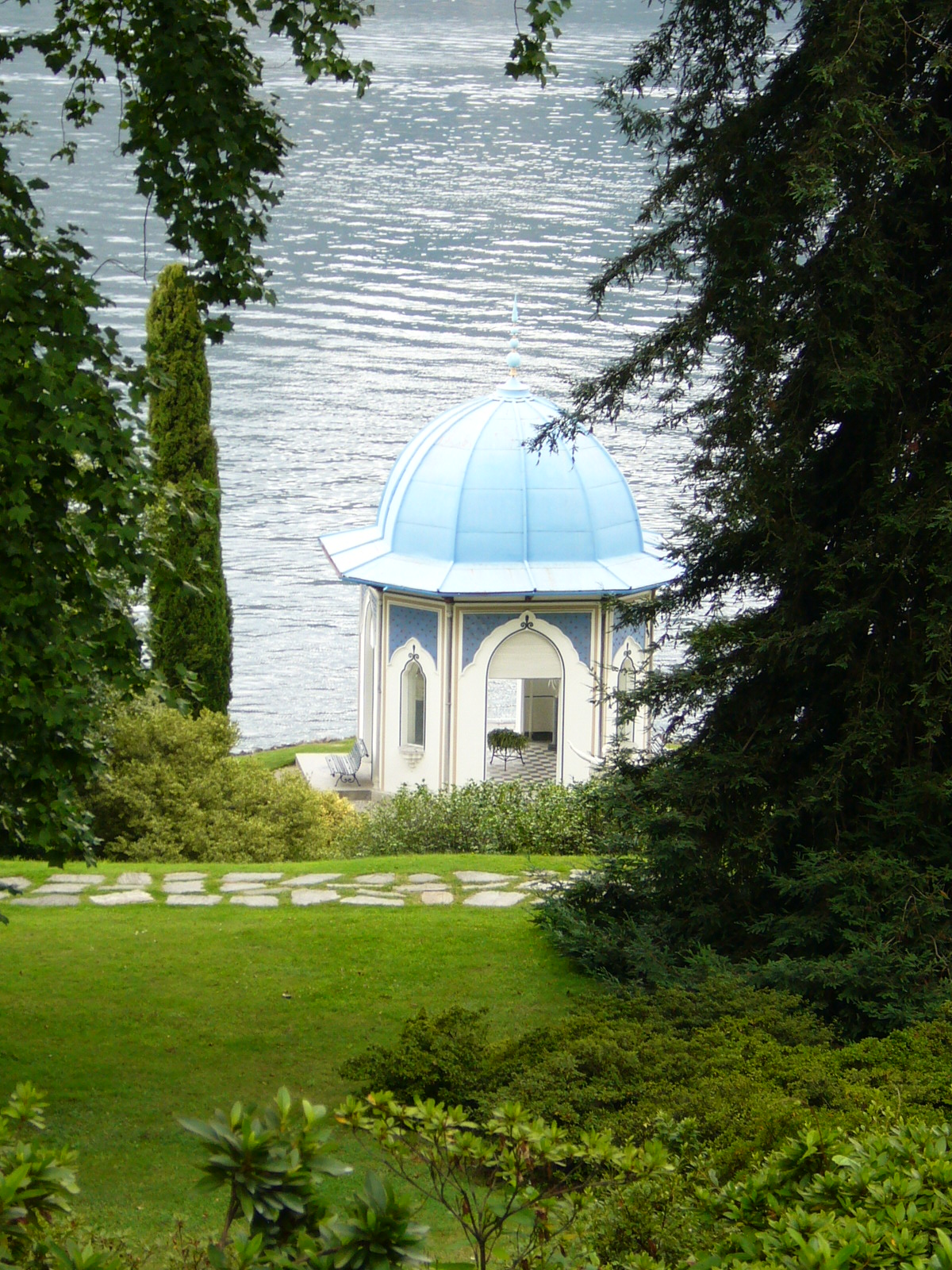
Villa Melzi: the Moorish Pavilion, furnished with neoclassical busts

Even after Melzi's political career ended, he continued to develop the villa and gardens, aiming for elegance comparable to the Royal Villa of Monza and other Lake Como villas. Renowned artists of the time, including painters Appiani and Bossi, sculptors Canova and Comolli, and medalist Luigi Manfredini, contributed to its decoration and furnishings. Melzi's art collection rivaled that of Giovan Battista Sommariva (owner of Villa Carlotta), who sought to surpass Melzi's prestige through art patronage.

Villa Melzi's English-style gardens extend along the lakefront, framing views towards the southern hills. Creating the gardens involved significant land reshaping and the construction of retaining walls. The gardens feature monuments, artifacts (including a Venetian gondola brought for Napoleon and Egyptian statues), exotic plants, mature trees, camellia hedges, azalea groves, and rhododendrons. The villa, chapel, and glasshouse form a neoclassical ensemble.

== Sports ==
=== Rowing ===
Rowing is a prominent sport in Bellagio, based at the Bellagina Sporting Union. World rowing champions Enrico Gandola, Alberto Belgeri, Igor Pescialli, Franco Sancassani, and Daniele Gilardoni are Bellagio natives and began their careers with Bellagina.

=== Cycling ===
Bellagio is the starting point for the ascent to the Sanctuary of Madonna del Ghisallo, the patron saint of cyclists, a popular destination for cycling enthusiasts. The climb covers approximately 4 kilometers (2.5 mi) with a 500-meter (1,600 ft) vertical ascent, achievable by professional cyclists in around 20 minutes. Other climbs in the area include the ascent from Onno to Valbrona on the eastern shore and the Muro di Sormano on the western shore. These climbs are part of the Tris del Lario competition.

=== Trekking ===
Various trekking routes, ranging in difficulty, are available around Bellagio and the Larian Triangle. Bellagio Lifestyle provides information on major treks with maps and route descriptions.

== Cuisine ==
The traditional dish of Bellagio is Tóch, a polenta dish mixed with butter and cheese, eaten with a wooden spoon and accompanied by dried lake fish, cold stuffed chicken, or homemade salami. Red wine is typically shared from a communal jug. Desserts include miasca, a cornflour and dried fruit cake; Pan meino, made with white and yellow flour, eggs, butter, milk, and elderflowers; and paradèl, a wafer made of white flour, milk, and sugar.

== Transportation ==
=== Air ===
The closest airports to Bellagio are:

- Malpensa Airport (MXP), Milan
- Linate Airport (LIN), Milan
- Orio al Serio International Airport (BGY), Bergamo
- Lugano Airport (LUG), Lugano, Switzerland

Trains from these airports connect to lake hubs such as Como and Lecco. Bus services frequently operate from these hubs to Bellagio and other lakeside towns. Bus service from Lugano is available to Menaggio, with ferry connections to Bellagio. Chartered seaplanes also land on Lake Como.

=== Rail ===
The nearest railway lines to Bellagio are:

- Milan–Como (two lines, operated by Trenord)
- Milan–Lecco (operated by Trenord)
- Milan–Asso (operated by Trenord)

Information on train schedules is available from Trenitalia or Trenord.

=== Water ===
Hydrofoil services connect Como and Bellagio, stopping at other Lake Como towns. Car ferries operate between Varenna and Cadenabbia to Bellagio, providing shorter crossings of under 15 minutes. Further details are available from Gestione Governativa Navigazione Laghi.

Ferries provide convenient access to Bellagio. Varenna is the closest train station to Bellagio, requiring a ferry connection.

=== Road ===
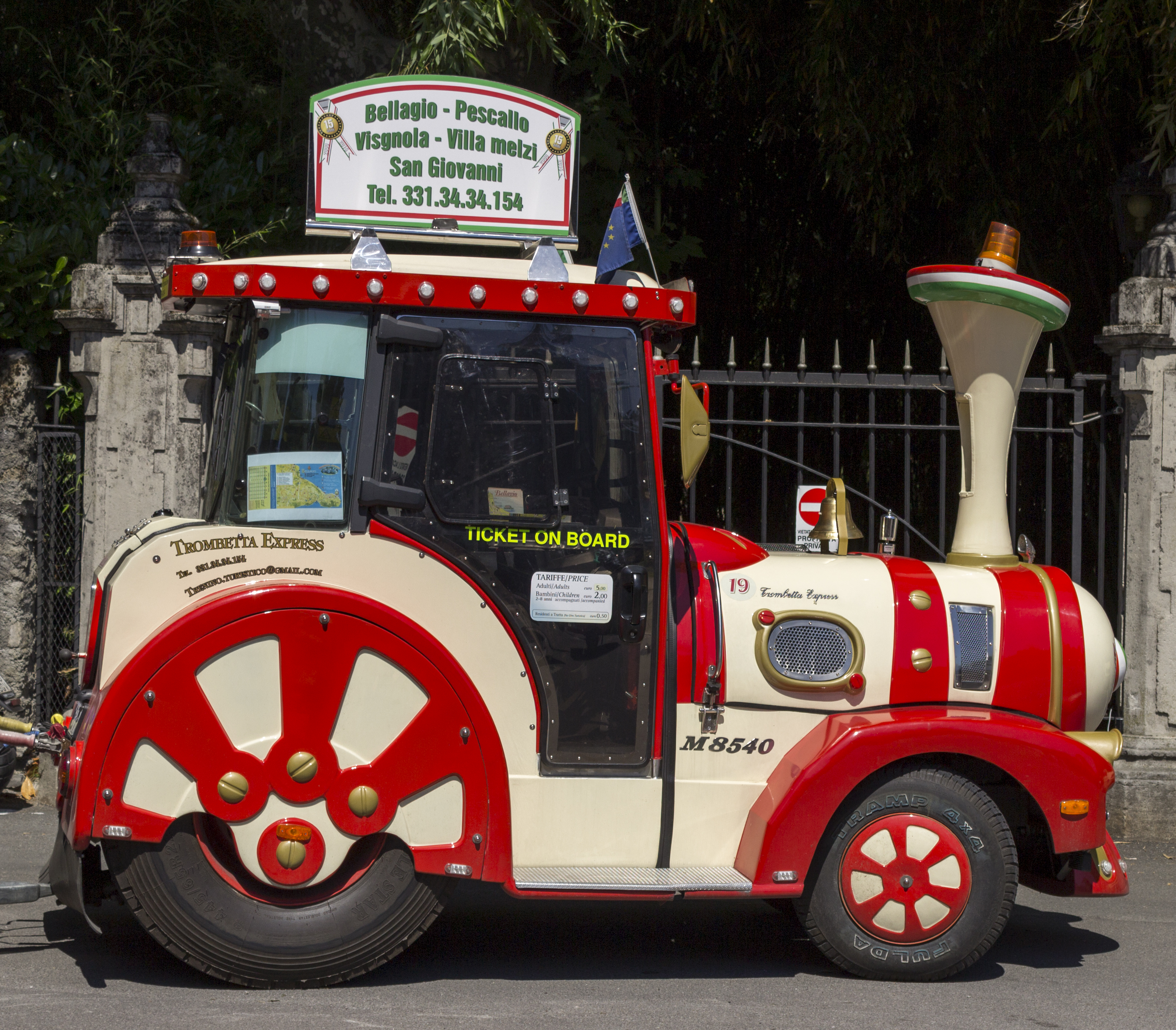
Trombetta Express

Bellagio is accessible by roads from Como, Lecco and Canzo. The road from Como (SP583) is narrow and winding, and heavily congested during summer, potentially extending travel times to Bellagio by car to 90 minutes. Driving from Como to Cadenabbia and taking the car ferry to Bellagio could be a faster alternative. Another option is to use the road on the eastern shore, from Lecco to Varenna, then take a ferry.

Public buses run daily from Como to Bellagio, but they may be especially crowded during summer. Public buses run daily from Canzo main train station to Bellagio.

== Twin towns ==
Bellagio is a founding member of the Douzelage, a town twinning association of 24 towns across the European Union, established in 1991. The Douzelage promotes regular events, including markets featuring products from member countries and festivals. Membership discussions are ongoing with Agros (Cyprus), Škofja Loka (Slovenia), and Tryavna (Bulgaria).

- Altea, Spain (1991)
- Bad Kötzting, Germany (1991)
- (Republic of Ireland) Bundoran, Ireland (1991)
- Granville, France (1991)
- Holstebro, Denmark (1991)
- Houffalize, Belgium (1991)
- Meerssen, Netherlands (1991)
- Niederanven, Luxembourg (1991)
- Preveza, Greece (1991)
- Sesimbra, Portugal (1991)
- Sherborne, England, United Kingdom (1991)
- Karkkila, Finland (1997)
- Oxelösund, Sweden (1998)
- Judenburg, Austria (1999)
- Chojna, Poland (2004)
- Kőszeg, Hungary (2004)
- Sigulda, Latvia (2004)
- Sušice, Czech Republic (2004)
- Türi, Estonia (2004)
- Zvolen, Slovakia (2007)
- Rokiškis, Lithuania (2018)
- Marsaskala, Malta (2009)
- Siret, Romania (2010)
