= Villa Serbelloni =

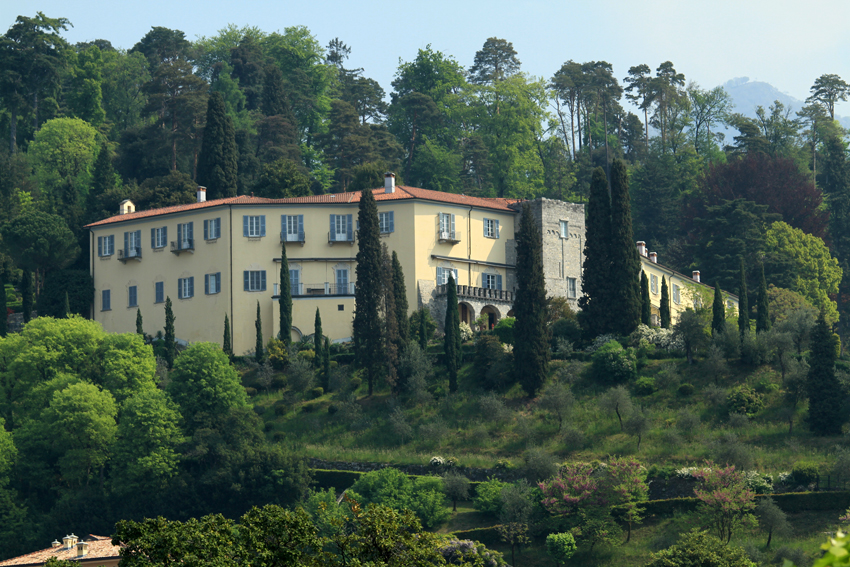
- Villa Serbelloni in Bellagio
- Click on the map for a fullscreen view

General information
- Location: Bellagio, Italy
- Coordinates: 45.9869°N 9.2636°E

Villa Serbelloni is a villa in Bellagio, Northern Italy. Just behind the hill of the promontory into the lake of Como, protected from the winds, the villa dominates the town's historic centre. It can be reached from Via Garibaldi. It was built in the 15th century in place of an old castle razed in 1375. Villa Serbelloni was later rebuilt several times. In 1788 it came into the possession of Alessandro Serbelloni (1745–1826) who enriched it with precious decorations and works of art of the 17th and 18th centuries. Today you can visit only the gardens.

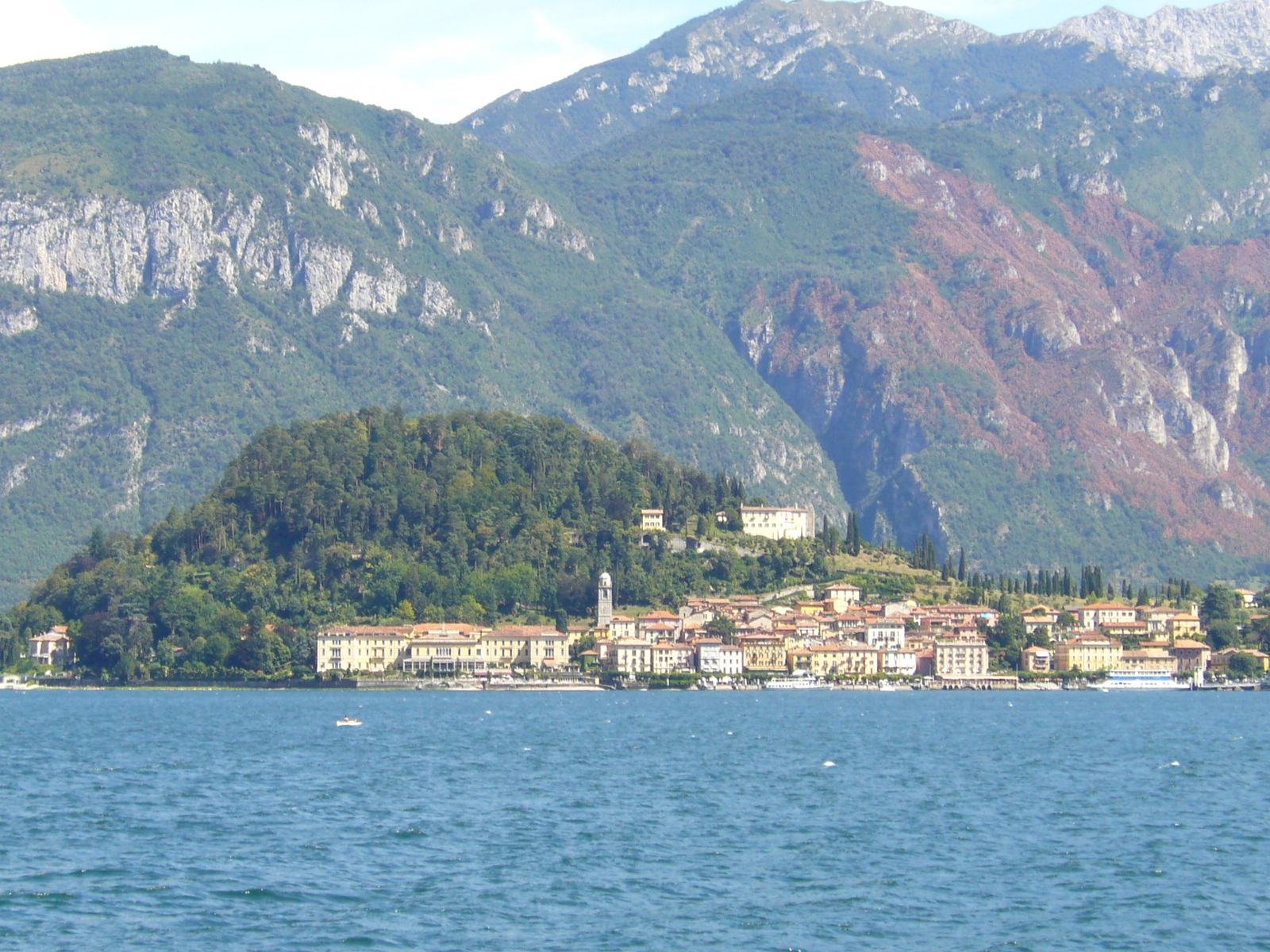
View of Bellagio. The building under the crown of the hill is Villa Serbelloni, believed to have been built on the site of Pliny the Younger's villa "Tragedy." His villa "Comedy" was down on the shore.

On the inside, elegant halls with vault and coffered ceilings follow one another accurately decorated in the style of the 17th and 18th centuries. All around, the park develops along most of the promontory of Bellagio with vast tracts of thick woods where the Serbelloni gardeners had traced paths which nowadays still lead the way amongst the small clearings and English style gardens.

As noted by Balbiani, rather than being a garden, it is a real "wood, opened by spacious and comfortable paths, and plants with all generations of high trunk trees"; amongst which, oak trees, conifers, fir trees, holm oaks, osmanti, myrtles and junipers, "but above all trees, here situated is the pine tree, which, with its gnarled trunk acts as a screen against the storms".

Occasionally, the vegetation thins out at panoramic points which overlook the two branches of the lake, offering a prospect from the slopes of the hill, where the rose bushes flower during the season. There is a winding path which goes up to the villa, also terraces and flower beds with yews and boxes trimmed geometrically. Along the upper part of the park is a long row of cypress trees and some palm trees.

In 1905, the villa was transformed into a luxury hotel. In 1959 it became the property of the Rockefeller Foundation of New York at the bequest of the American-born Princess of Thurn and Taxis (wife of Alessandro, 1st Duke of Castel Duino), who had bought it in 1930. Since 1960 the Bellagio Center in the villa has been home to international conferences housed in the former villa or in the grounds. In addition, outstanding scholars and artists are selected for one-month residencies year-round.

In June 1963, U.S. President John F. Kennedy stopped at the Villa after his helicopter landed in the grounds on a visit to Lake Como.

== See also ==
- Villa del Balbianello
- Villa Bernasconi
- Villa Carlotta
- Villa Erba
- Villa d'Este, Cernobbio
- Villa Melzi
- Villa Monastero
- Villa Olmo
- Villa Vigoni
