= Fabius Constable =

Fabius Constable Fabius Constable
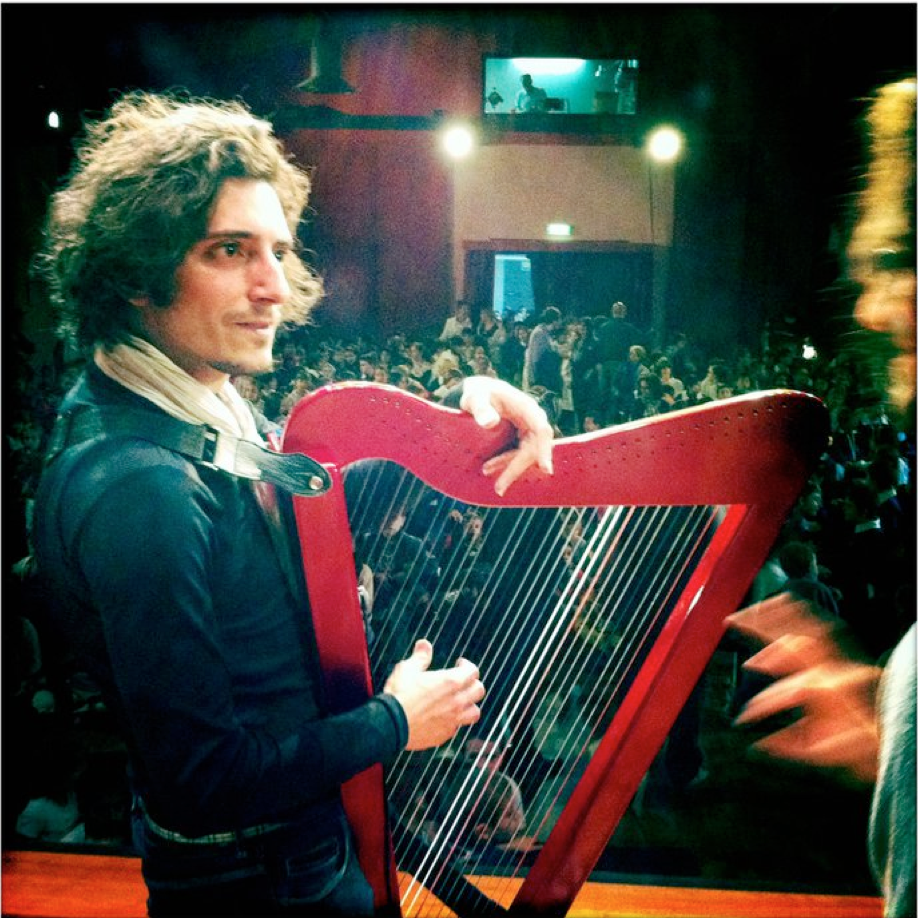
- Fabius Constable on stage

Background information
- Born: Fabius Constable
- Origin: Province of Como, Italy
- Genres: Instrumental, new-age, classic
- Occupations: Harpist, composer, musician, record producer
- Instruments: Celtic harp, Piano
- Years active: 2003–present
- Labels: Warner/Chappell Music, Sony BMG, auditoria records
- Website: constable.it

Fabius Constable is an Italian celtic harp player, and director and founder of the Celtic Harp Orchestra, a successful orchestra made of 24 celtic harps, with 70 or more official concerts every year.

== Career ==
He started playing music at the age of 4, studying piano at Milan Academy "G. Verdi". He could learn the secrets of the harp thanks to the experiences with the harpers Myrdhin, Harbison, Euron and many others, studying in Ireland and in Brittany. In his professional career he performed in notable venues of Europe and Asia, such as Auditorium Parco della Musica in Rome, the Trinity College of Dublin, Naples Conservatory of Music, the Duomo Cathedral in Milan, the St. Patrick Parade in Munich, Villa Erba, Villa Olmo, Villa Balbianello, many major theaters around Italy and the Xebio Arena in Sendai, Japan, on a national broadcasting live show. He has been interviewed by several major TV channels, including RAI (Italy), RTSI (Switzerland), CCTV3 (China), and NHK (Japan). He published 8 official CDs and his music has been published on 28 discographic issues and anthologies (some of them produced and distributed by Warner/Chappell Music, Sony BMG). He worked for cinema soundtracks in the majors distribution ring.

He lectured and played the celtic harp in music academies and universities such as the Tianjin Music Academy (China), the NHK Music Hall (Japan), Madras University (India), the Trinity College (Ireland), Conservatorio di Napoli (Italy).

He currently organizes charity initiatives, among them a program for playing in hospitals, prisons, and emergency shelters. He was the first western artist to perform in the Tohoku area after the 2011 Japan earthquake and tsunami, in 23 concerts.

Fabius received a medal from the Italian President Giorgio Napolitano for his charity initiatives.

He performed on stage with many important artists such as Andrea Bocelli, Arnoldo Foà, Ron, Carlos Nunez, and many others. He also met on stage the famous architect Tadao Ando, composing and playing the music for his lecture at the University of Bologna in 2012.

On 2 June 2019 he received the Cavaliere knight Honor Award for "Enterprises in the Italian Republic".

== Discography ==
=== Studio albums ===
- '’Celtic World'’ (2003)
- '’Keltic'’ (2004)
- '’Got the Magic'’ (2004)
- '’Anphisbena'’ (2005)
- '’The Myst'’ (2005)
- '’Tale of the Fourth'’ (2008)
- '’Three Letters to the Moon'’ (2010)
- '’Best of Celtica, Vol.2'’ (2012)
- '’Best of Celtica, Vol.3' (2012)
- '’Three Letters from the Sun'’ (2014)
