= Valerio Meletti =

Valerio Meletti is a media monitoring specialist working for the main Italian media monitoring agency since 2006. Managing web and social media monitoring are his main skills.

He founded and managed three music publishing companies: Ethnoworld, Silent Revolution (London, 2005–2008) and Ignorelands (since 2016).

As a percussionist Valerio Meletti worked extensively with F.B.A. and the Celtic Harp Orchestra, appearing on some of the bands' finest works: above all "Till the sky shall fall" (F.B.A.) and "The Myst" (C.H.O.), both critically acclaimed and worldwide distributed.

As a band manager V.M. has been working since 2004 with The Afterglow releasing three albums (including the 2006 much acclaimed "Decalogue of Modern Life", mixed by Steve Orchard), touring England/Scotland four times, and shooting videoclips in London and Liverpool.

As an event manager V.Meletti worked for Milan's Festa della Musica 2004 and organized festivals and events such like the Bocconi University Ethnic Festival ("Ethnobocconi") or "Musiche della Terra".

Meletti held workshops and classes focused on record labels' management, including lessons at the Bocconi University CLEACC.

He also self published a theatre play ("The Ninja Cricketer and Scratched", a handbook on how to play the Celtic drum bodhràn ("Suonare il bodhràn", in Italian) and a book on Italians living in Venezuela during the '50s and '60s ("Italiani in Venezuela", in Italian, with his father Giorgio Meletti).
