= The Devil Wears Prada 2 =

2026 film by David Frankel

- Theatrical release poster
- Directed by: David Frankel
- Screenplay by: Aline Brosh McKenna
- Based on: Characters by Lauren Weisberger
- Produced by: Wendy Finerman
- Starring: Meryl Streep; Anne Hathaway; Emily Blunt; Justin Theroux; Kenneth Branagh; Stanley Tucci
- Cinematography: Florian Ballhaus
- Edited by: Andrew Marcus
- Music by: Theodore Shapiro
- Production company: Wendy Finerman Productions
- Distributed by: 20th Century Studios
- Release dates: April 20, 2026 (Lincoln Center, Manhattan); May 1, 2026 (United States)
- Running time: 119 minutes
- Country: United States
- Language: English
- Budget: $100 million
- Box office: $693.5 million

The Devil Wears Prada 2 is a 2026 American comedy drama film directed by David Frankel and written by Aline Brosh McKenna. A sequel to the 2006 film The Devil Wears Prada, it sees Meryl Streep, Anne Hathaway, Emily Blunt, and Stanley Tucci reprising their roles, joined by Justin Theroux, Lucy Liu, and Kenneth Branagh. Set two decades after the events of the first film, it follows Andy Sachs (Hathaway) as she helps Miranda Priestly (Streep) navigate a new media landscape and corporate threats to the survival of Runway magazine.

Despite the success of The Devil Wears Prada, Streep and Hathaway were initially hesitant about the prospects of a sequel. Development on the film began in July 2024, with all four leading actors – Streep, Hathaway, Blunt, and Tucci – signing on to reprise their roles, and Frankel and McKenna returning to direct and write, respectively. Additional castings for new characters were revealed between then and November 2025. Principal photography took place from June to October 2025 in Manhattan and Milan, with additional filming in Newark, New Jersey.

The Devil Wears Prada 2 premiered on April 20, 2026, in New York, and was released in theaters in the United States by 20th Century Studios on May 1. It received generally positive reviews from critics and was a box office success, grossing $693.5 million on a $100 million production budget, becoming the sixth-highest-grossing film of 2026.

== Plot ==
Two decades after leaving Runway magazine, (Note: As depicted in The Devil Wears Prada (2006)) Andrea "Andy" Sachs has become a respected global journalist based in New York City. However, her entire newsroom is abruptly laid off by text message during an awards ceremony. Meanwhile, Miranda Priestly, Andy's old Runway boss, is under fire for publishing a puff piece about a fashion brand that uses sweatshop labor.

To improve the magazine's credibility, Irv Ravitz, who owns Runway's parent company, Elias-Clarke, and is Miranda's boss, hires Andy as the features editor without Miranda's knowledge. An uncharacteristically listless Miranda struggles to navigate modern fashion media. Although she retains some tyrannical office behavior, HR complaints have blunted her imperiousness. By contrast, she enjoys a close relationship with her husband, Stuart.

Miranda's right-hand assistant, Nigel Kipling, tells Andy that people no longer read Runway's print edition, forcing the brand to embrace online clickbait and cheaply made short-form content to retain advertisers and generate profit. One key advertiser is Dior, which employs Emily Charlton, Andy's former Runway co-worker. Emily leverages the controversy over the Runway puff piece to secure free advertising and a Dior article, which Miranda assigns to Andy. During the interview, Emily and Andy spar over how modern fashion has raised retail prices and shuts out middle-class consumers.

After writing serious articles that gain minimal traction, Andy improves her Runway standing by brokering a coveted interview with Sasha Barnes, the reclusive divorcée of Silicon Valley billionaire, Benji Barnes. Irv promises to make Miranda global head of content at Elias-Clarke but suffers a fatal heart attack at his 75th birthday party before officially announcing the promotion. His son, Jay, takes over Elias-Clarke and puts Miranda's promotion on hold while bringing in management consultants to restructure the magazine and recommend cost cuts. To Andy's surprise, Miranda bears with it. Meanwhile, Andy's romantic interest in Peter stalls when she unintentionally dismisses his job as an apartment renovator while fretting over her own career. Considering her options, Andy explores writing a tell-all book about Miranda. A publisher offers her a lucrative contract, but Andy is conflicted.

During Milan Fashion Week, Andy devises a plan to save Runway by finding a wealthy patron to buy it from Jay. The patron is Benji Barnes, Emily's current boyfriend. Miranda is furious, knowing Emily secretly plans to assume her position at Runway. Miranda admits to pushing out Emily from Runway, saying she lacks creative vision. Miranda acts graciously over losing her position, but during discussions with Benji, his intent to replace Runway's staff by AI alarms her.

To prevent Benji and Emily from destroying Runway, Miranda directs Andy to find a competing buyer. Andy convinces Sasha to buy not just Runway but all of Elias-Clarke; Jay accepts her offer, cancelling his deal with Benji. Miranda realizes she has taken Nigel for granted over the years. To make amends, she asks him to deliver the gala's keynote speech in her place, while she and Andy finalize the deal with Sasha, who gives Miranda the promotion Irv promised her.

As the Runway staff return to New York, Miranda admits to Andy that the latter's idealism inspired her to fight back. She also reveals knowing about Andy's plans for a tell-all book and encourages her to write it, including the negative aspects of Miranda's life. Andy reconciles with Peter and also with the defeated Emily, who is now working at COACH fashion and whom Benji broke up with. Nigel reveals that he prompted Irv to rehire Andy. Miranda gives Andy a nicer office and returns to work with a renewed imperiousness.

== Cast ==
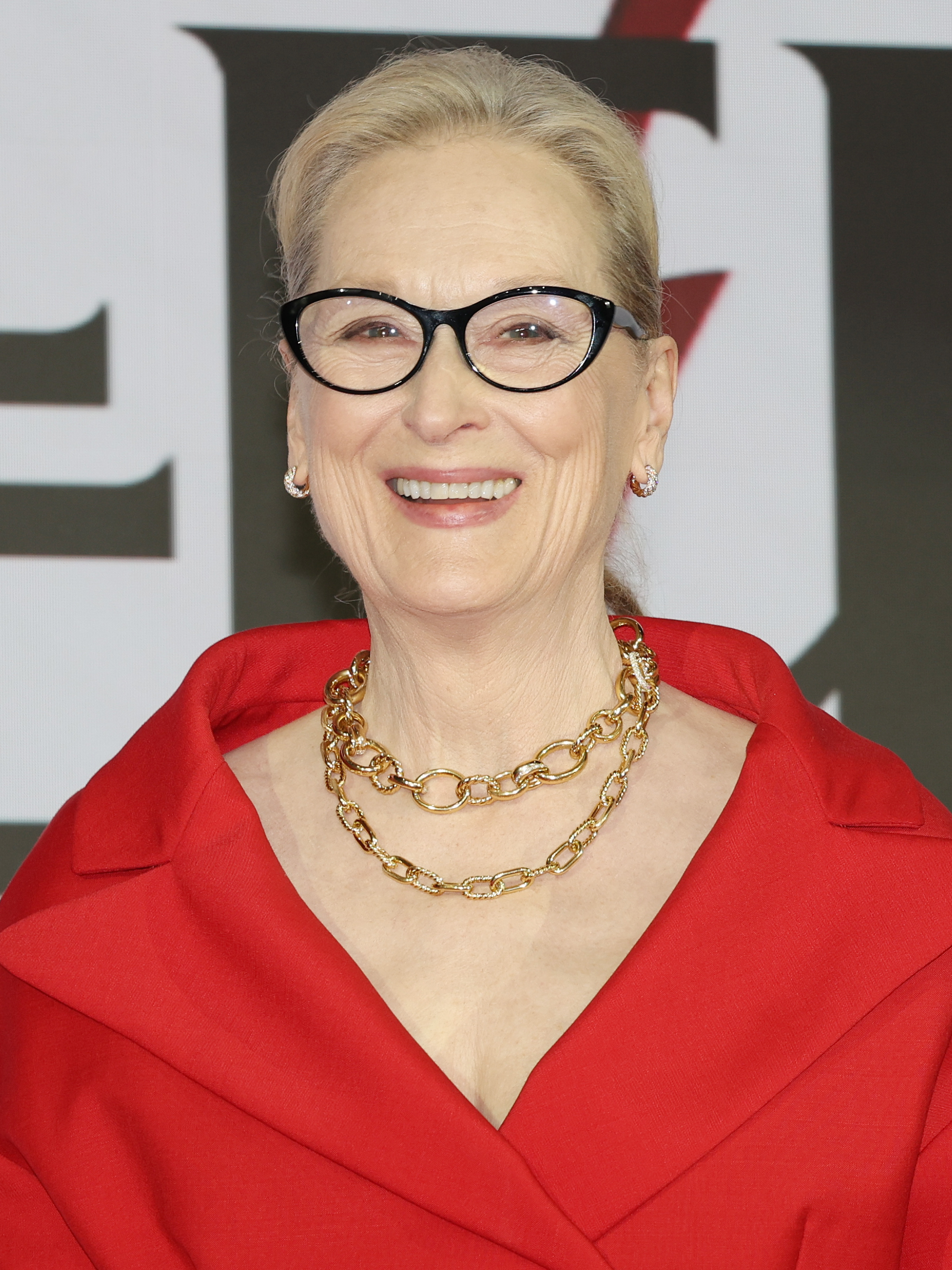
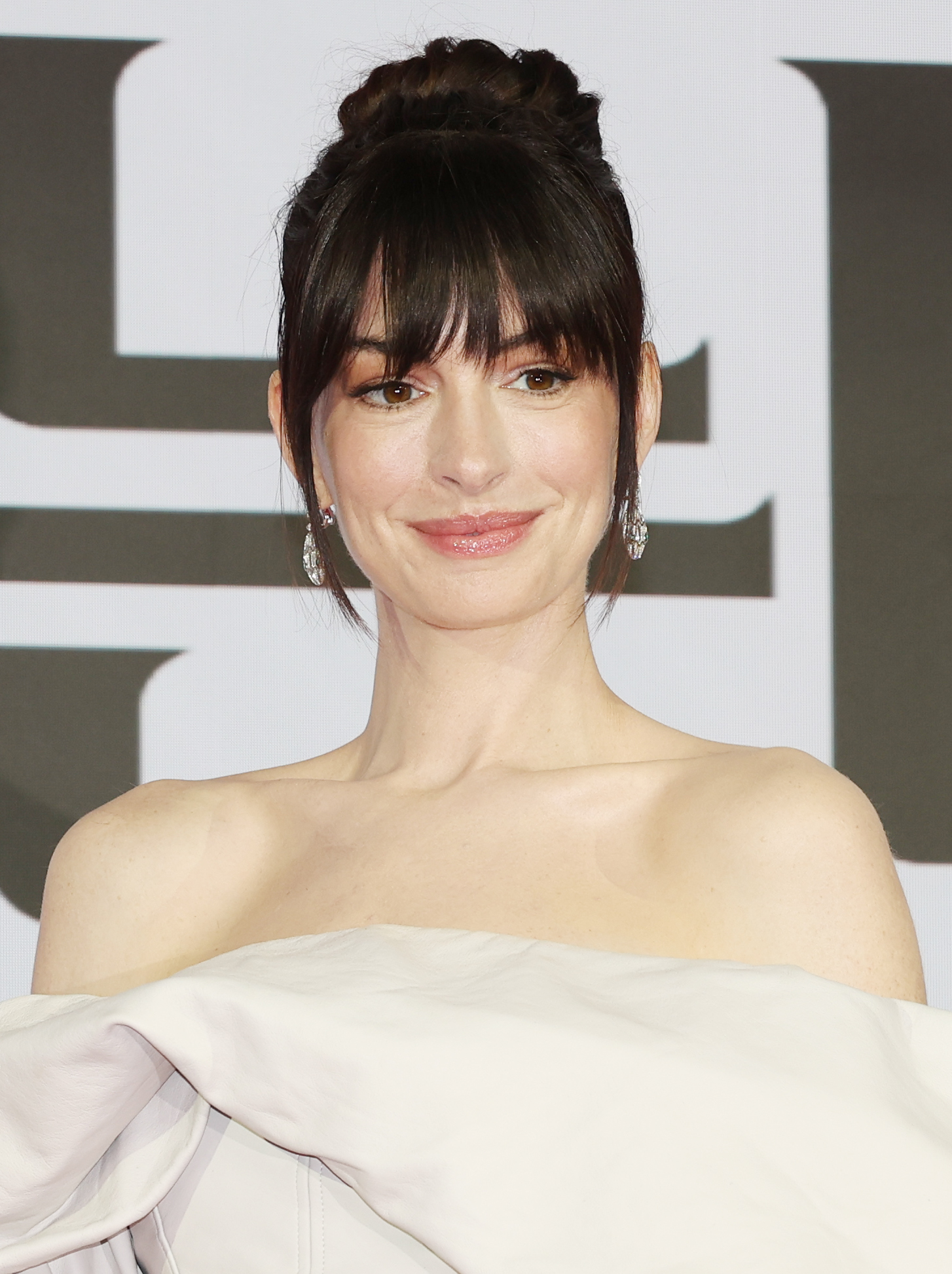
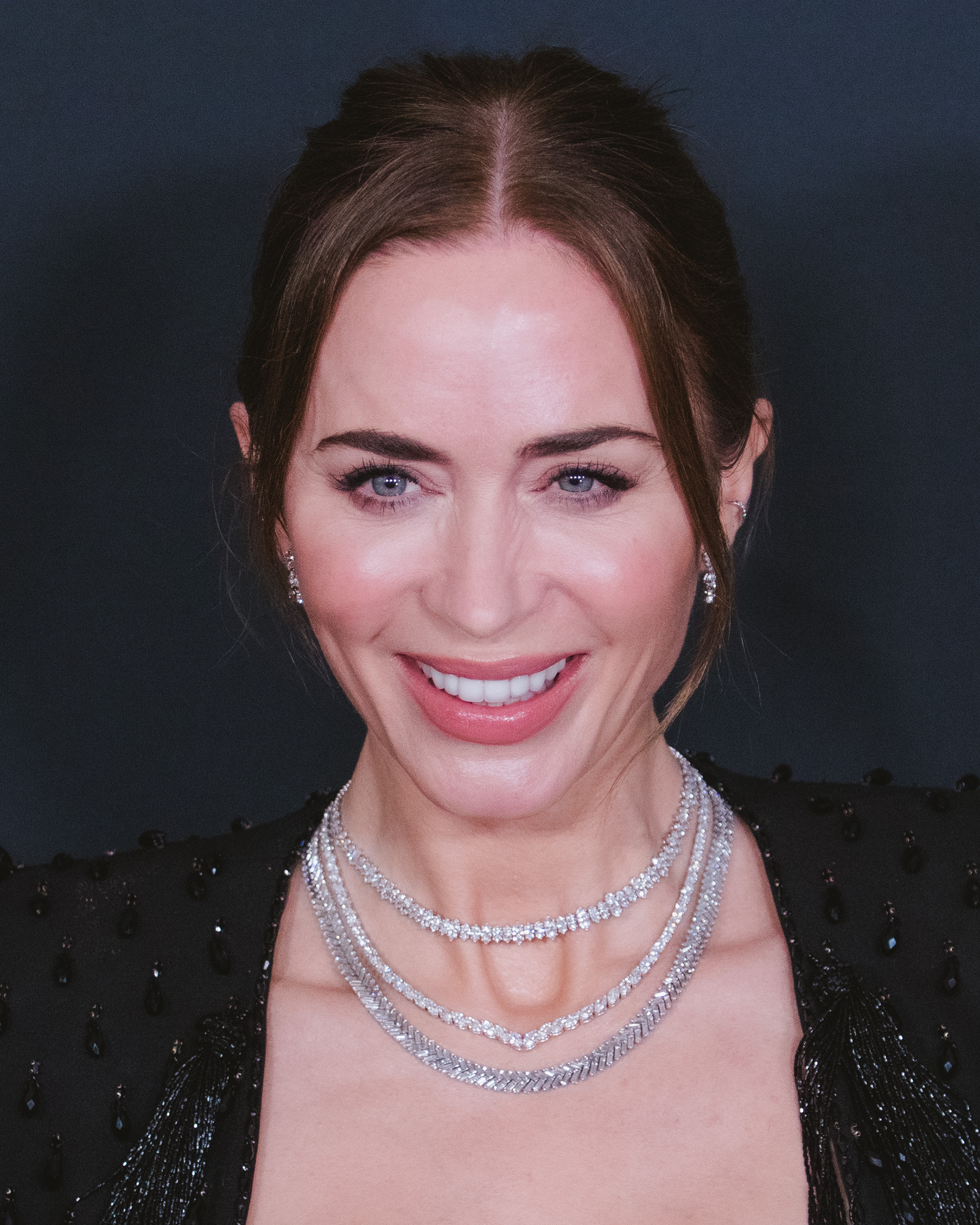
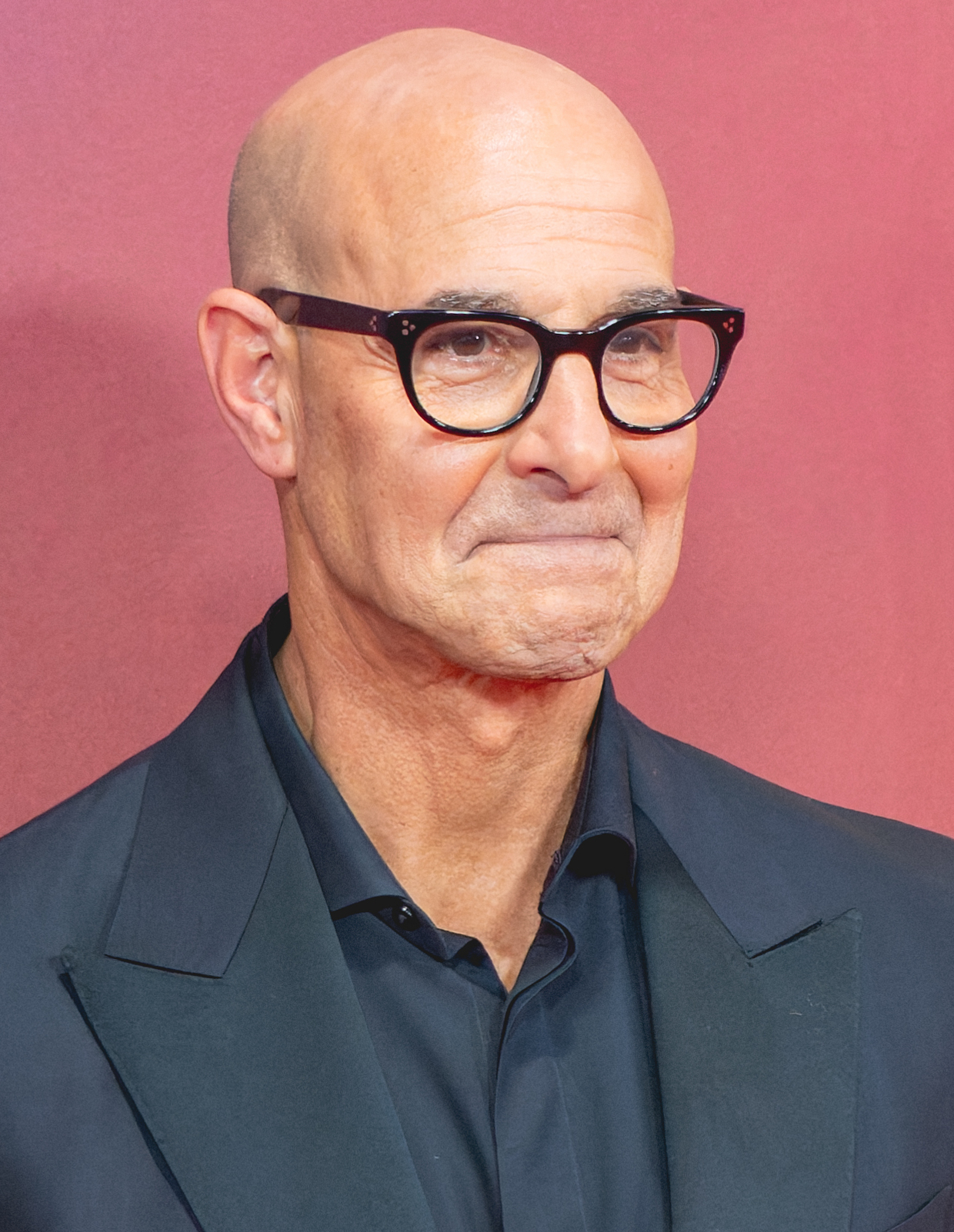
The film stars Meryl Streep, Anne Hathaway, Emily Blunt, and Stanley Tucci, who all reprise their roles from the first film.
- Meryl Streep as Miranda Priestly, the editor-in-chief of the Runway fashion magazine
- Anne Hathaway as Andrea "Andy" Sachs, a journalist and Miranda's former second assistant who becomes the new Runway features editor
- Emily Blunt as Emily Charlton, Miranda's former first assistant, who is now a senior executive at Dior
- Stanley Tucci as Nigel Kipling, Miranda's longtime right hand
- Justin Theroux as Benji Barnes, Emily's boyfriend
- Kenneth Branagh as Stuart Simmons, Miranda's new husband
- Lucy Liu as Sasha Barnes, Benji's ex-wife
- B. J. Novak as Jay Ravitz, the finance-bro heir to the Elias-Clarke publishing house
- Simone Ashley as Amari Mari, Miranda's current first assistant
- Tracie Thoms as Lily, Andy's best friend
- Tibor Feldman as Irv Ravitz, Runway chairman, owner of its parent company Elias-Clarke, and Jay's father
- Patrick Brammall as Peter, Andy's love interest
- Caleb Hearon as Charlie, Miranda's current second assistant
- Helen J. Shen as Jin Chao, Andy's assistant
- Rachel Bloom as Talia, Andy's friend
- Larry Mitchell as Mack, Andy's journalist friend
- George C. Wolfe as Paul, a Runway editor
- Pauline Chalamet as Ilana Poole, a Runway editor
- Wes McGee as Frank, Emily's ex-husband
- Lady Gaga as a fictionalized version of herself who has a history with Miranda.

The following personalities also make cameo appearances as themselves:

- Donatella Versace
- Marc Jacobs
- Ciara
- Calum Harper
- Ashley Graham
- Amelia Dimoldenberg
- Heidi Klum
- Winnie Harlow
- Karl-Anthony Towns
- Jon Batiste
- Suleika Jaouad
- Law Roach
- Jenna Bush Hager
- Naomi Campbell
- Kara Swisher
- Rory McIlroy
- Moon Ga-young
- Doyoung
- Ronny Chieng
- Tina Brown
- Tomi Adeyemi

== Production ==
=== Development ===
In 2013, Lauren Weisberger wrote and published Revenge Wears Prada: The Devil Returns, a sequel to her 2003 novel The Devil Wears Prada, which had been adapted into the 2006 film. However, it did not seem likely that an adaptation of that novel, or any sequel, would be made, as starring cast members Meryl Streep and Anne Hathaway were not eager to do such a film. Streep reportedly said she was not interested, while Hathaway stated she would like to work with the same people on "something totally different".

In July 2024, it was reported that Walt Disney Studios, the parent division of 20th Century Studios, was interested in developing a sequel. Negotiations began that month with Aline Brosh McKenna returning to write the screenplay, and Streep, Hathaway, Emily Blunt and Stanley Tucci reprising their roles from the first film. A $100 million budget was allotted for production, almost triple the cost of the original film, unadjusted for inflation. David Frankel, who returned as director, said that most of the difference was accounted for by actors' salaries and "[we had] basically the same budget for making the movie as we did the first one." It was later revealed that Streep, Hathaway, and Blunt had pay parity on the sequel, each receiving $12.5 million upfront plus backends contingent on the film's performance, with the potential to ultimately earn over $20 million each.

=== Casting and filming ===
Principal photography began on June 30, 2025, with Frankel again directing, and Kenneth Branagh joining the cast. In July, it was announced that Tracie Thoms and Tibor Feldman would also reprise their roles, with Simone Ashley, Lucy Liu, Justin Theroux, B. J. Novak, Pauline Chalamet, Rachel Bloom, and Patrick Brammall joining the cast as new additions.

Streep, Hathaway, and Tucci were spotted filming in Manhattan during the week of July 21, 2025. Blunt was spotted for the first time a week later. Brammall and Hathaway were spotted filming a scene together on August 5. An important airport scene was shot at Newark on September 10. Tucci and Streep filmed at Dolce & Gabbana's Milan Fashion Week show on September 27. Filming took place in Milan, Italy, from October 6 to 18. In October, Donatella Versace was seen on set filming a cameo appearance, while Lady Gaga was announced to have a role. Ashley finished filming her scenes on October 17. Filming officially wrapped on October 20. By November, Caleb Hearon, Helen J. Shen, Conrad Ricamora, and Calum Harper were also announced to have been cast. In April 2026, it was revealed that Sydney Sweeney, who was meant to cameo as herself, was cut from the finished film.

Some filming locations attracted crowds of onlookers after social media reported that scenes were being filmed there, which had not happened with the first film. According to production designer Jess Gonchor, who also returned from the original, it was "a mob scene" at the American Museum of Natural History, again standing in for the Metropolitan Museum of Art. Fortunately, he says, the production needed a crowd for the scene anyway, so it helped. A large crowd in the Meatpacking District also watched the filming of the scene where Andy boards the Hampton Jitney. "The shoot was the middle of summer and it was pretty special to see people embracing the movie like that. It never disrupted the filming but it did make everyone feel like the Beatles." Overzealous paparazzi, however, did disrupt filming by fighting among themselves while Hathaway and Tucci were filming a scene, causing them to break character.

=== Sets and locations ===
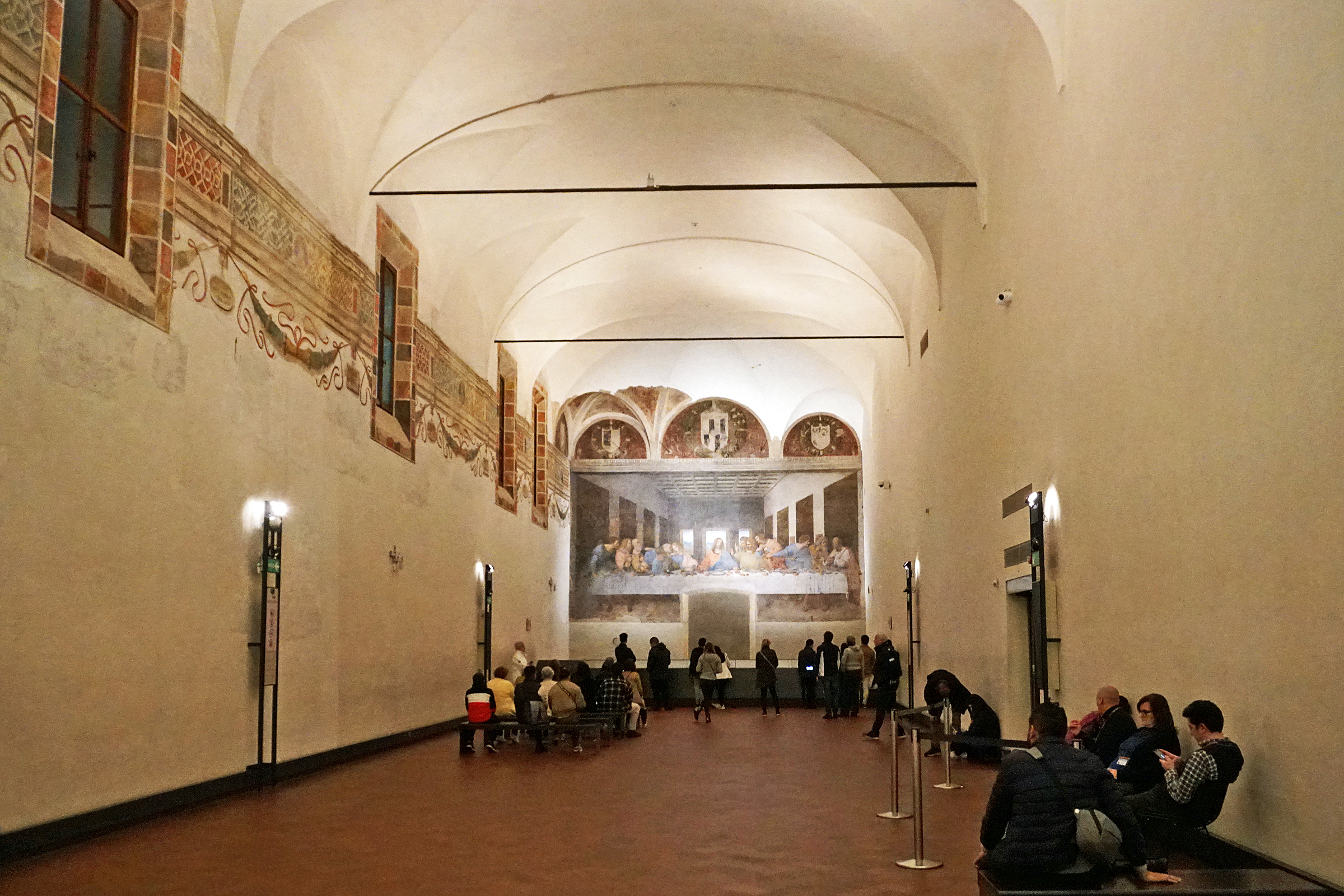
The refectory at Santa Maria delle Grazie, with The Last Supper

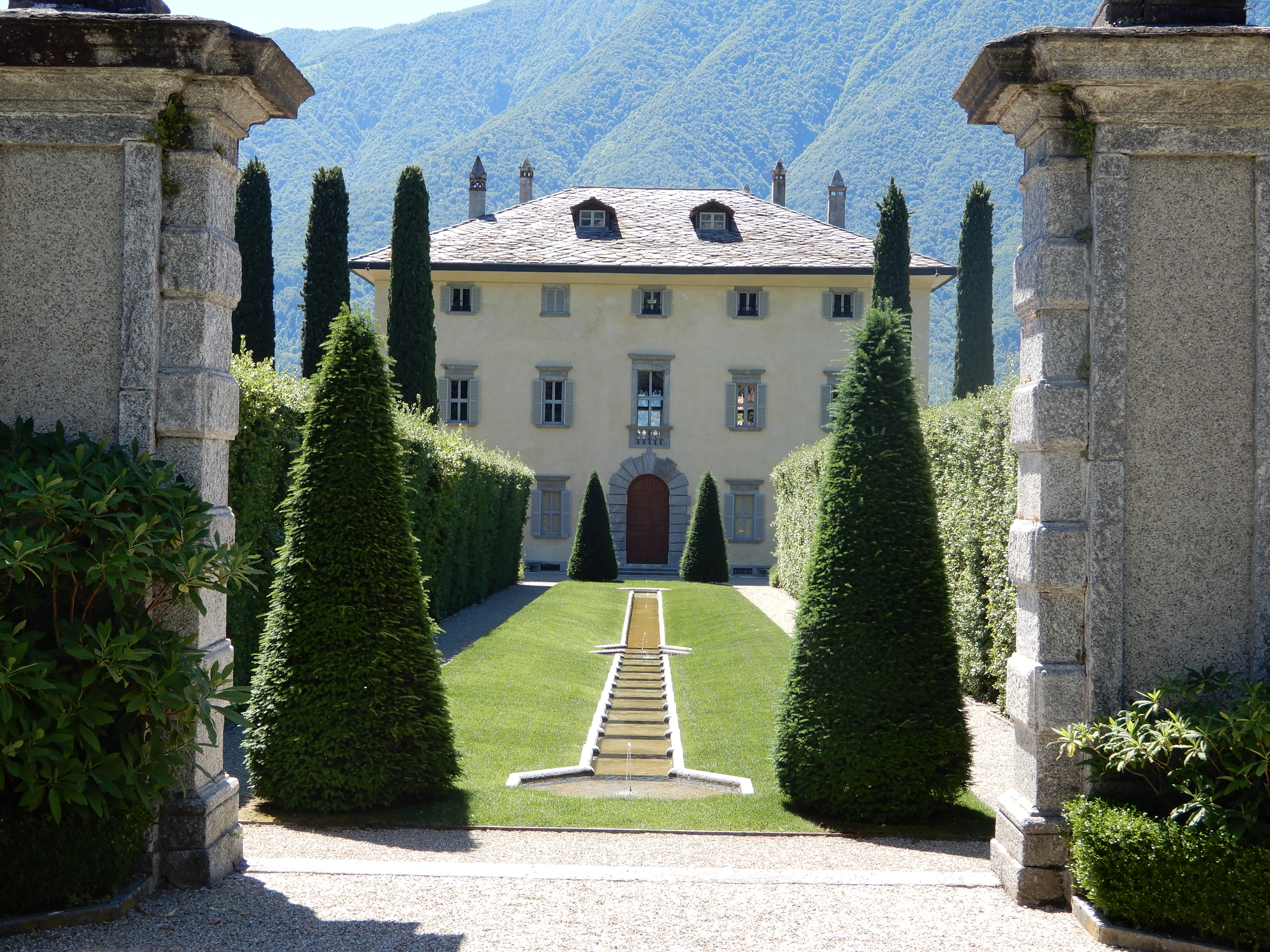
Villa del Balbiano

Gonchor, the production designer for the first film, returned for the sequel. The Runway offices were again sets built at Kaufman Astoria Studios in Queens, but this time, he told Architectural Digest, they were eight times larger, showing the space the original was meant only to suggest. "With the new offices, we're creating more of a visual story. We opened the whole thing up so it wasn't just about Miranda and the assistants." The former McGraw-Hill building at 1221 Avenue of the Americas again served as the exterior and lobby of the Elias-Clarke building. A large room was set up as a cafeteria.

"Saying the words 'The Devil Wears Prada' opened a lot of doors for us this time around and got us access into places we hadn't been able to before", Gonchor said. In New York, that meant the production was allowed to film at the Dior boutique at 57th Street and Madison Avenue before it opened, as well as in the lobby of the Waldorf Astoria hotel, which had been closed for six years for renovations. For Emily's office, newly opened space in the Hudson Yards development was used. Marc Jacobs allowed the production into his fitting rooms. The crew got permission to use the same townhouse that had been Miranda's in the first film.

While Manhattan's Woolworth Mansion stood in for the interiors of the hotel rooms in Milan, many other scenes set in Milan were filmed on location or elsewhere in Italy. The Palazzo Parigi & Grand Spa Milano, where the cast stayed while shooting, lent its exterior and lobby for filming, leading Tucci and Theroux to have martinis there between scenes. Lady Gaga's appearance was originally planned for the Piazza del Duomo but was moved to the Accademia di Brera to prevent word of her appearance from spreading. The dinner scene in the refectory of Santa Maria delle Grazie was filmed on a set built to three-quarters scale, including a hand-painted replication of Leonardo da Vinci's The Last Supper, by a team of craftsmen led by a woman who manages set design for a Roman opera house. Since they were not allowed to use the actual painting, "we had to really study that thing", Gonchor says. On several private tours, "we were allowed to take our time and figure out how we wanted to replicate it—just myself and a couple other people, no crowds. It was a really special thing to get to do." After a lengthy boat tour of Lake Como, Gonchor chose Villa del Balbiano as Benji's villa. "[W]e knew that Emily and Benji would arrive by boat, and we also wanted viewers to see the house from the lake, too, so that they were really brought into this lavish environment.

== Music ==
The film's soundtrack album was released through 20th Century Studios and Interscope Records on the same day as the film's North American debut. It is led by the single "Runway" by Lady Gaga and Doechii, which was previewed on the film's second trailer released on April 6, 2026, ahead of its official release on April 9. Lady Gaga also contributed two more original songs: "Shape of a Woman", which she performs in the film, and "Glamorous Life". There is also a scores-only soundtrack by composer Theodore Shapiro, returning from the first film, featuring 20 tracks and totaling 39 minutes.

== Release ==
=== Marketing ===
The first teaser trailer was released on November 12, 2025. It was reportedly the most-viewed comedy trailer in 15 years, with 181.5 million views in its first 24 hours alone. The film's color grading and lighting — as presented in the trailer — sparked numerous comments on social media and in the press, lamenting the widespread adoption of the "Netflix look" across the film industry (standardized colors, loss of contrast, resulting in a smooth and flat visual rendering). The film's first full trailer, released on February 1, 2026, recorded 222 million views within its first 24 hours, which 20th Century Studios described as the most-viewed trailer in the studio's history. In April 2026, Anna Wintour, the former editor-in-chief of Vogue and the purported inspiration for Streep's character Miranda Priestly, appeared on the cover of the magazine alongside the actress. Later that month, Streep and Hathaway traveled to South Korea to promote the film and participated in an interview with singer Jang Won-young.

The marketing campaign for The Devil Wears Prada 2 was reportedly one of the largest film promotional efforts ever undertaken by Disney. The Hollywood Reporter estimated the campaign's promotional value at $250 million, supported by brand partnerships with Dior, Google, The Coca-Cola Company, Grey Goose, Mercedes-Benz, L'Oréal, Zillow, TRESemmé, and United Airlines.

=== Theatrical release ===
The Devil Wears Prada 2 premiered at Lincoln Center in New York City on April 20, 2026, with the event being live-streamed on Disney+ and Hulu. Another premiere was held two days later in London. It premiered in Tokyo at Roppongi Hills on April 6, followed by premieres in Seoul on April 8 and Shanghai on April 10.

The film was released in 4,150 theaters in the United States on May 1, 2026. Disney had originally scheduled Avengers: Doomsday for May 1, but moved The Devil Wears Prada 2 to that date instead after the film was fast-tracked during production.

=== Home media ===
The Devil Wears Prada 2 was released on digital download on June 30, 2026, and on 4K Ultra HD and Blu-ray on July 28. A DVD bundle with the first film, including extra features, was released on the same date. The film began streaming on Disney+ and Hulu on July 29.

Nielsen Media Research, which records streaming viewership on certain U.S. television screens, reported that The Devil Wears Prada 2 was the most-streamed film during the week of July 27 to August 2, with 885 million minutes viewed. During the following week, from August 3–9, the film recorded 410 million minutes of watch time, placing fourth.

== Reception ==
=== Box office ===
The Devil Wears Prada 2 grossed $220.6 million in the United States and Canada, and $472.9 million in other territories, for a worldwide total of $693.5 million. In the United States and Canada, the film made $32.5 million on its opening day, including $10 million from Thursday previews. For its opening weekend, it earned $76.7 million, topping the box office and becoming the fourth-biggest debut for a 2026 film. It also outgrossed the original film's opening of $27.5 million in 2006, almost tripling its earnings or doubling them when adjusted for inflation.

Outside of the United States and Canada, the film made $27.5 million on its opening day, which added up to $114.6 million globally, marking the best opening day of 2026 in 16 countries. It grossed $156.6 million internationally during its opening weekend for a total of $233.6 million, becoming the second-best worldwide opening for a 2026 Motion Picture Association film, behind The Super Mario Galaxy Movie ($372.5 million). It opened at number one in almost all major markets and marked the highest-grossing weekends of 2026 in multiple countries. The film was the highest global opening weekend for Streep and Blunt, beating Mamma Mia! Here We Go Again (2018) and Oppenheimer (2023), respectively. By June 2026, The Devil Wears Prada 2 had grossed $676 million worldwide. Combined with the $327 million earned by the original film, the franchise's worldwide gross surpassed $1 billion.

=== Critical response ===
On the review aggregator website Rotten Tomatoes, 78% of 346 critics' reviews are positive, with an average rating of 6.6/10. The website's consensus reads: "Meryl Streep still wears Miranda Priestly like a finely-tailored suit in this sinfully enjoyable sequel, which is dressed to the nines in off-the-rack wish fulfillment and some trenchant observations about the state of modern media." Metacritic, which uses a weighted average, assigned the film a score of 63 out of 100, based on 57 critics, indicating "generally favorable" reviews. Audiences polled by CinemaScore gave the film an average grade of "A−" on an A+ to F scale, up from the first film's "B".

Justin Chang of The New Yorker wrote that the film is "selling a truckload of preposterous goods, but it sells them awfully well, with unfeigned assurance, conviction, and the appropriate ratio of cynicism to hope." David Sims of The Atlantic wrote, "It has plenty of breezy fun probing the dilemmas of modern media, without abandoning the glitz that made the original so enduring." Odie Henderson of The Boston Globe wrote, "Miranda is given more depth this time, which softens her just a tad, but it forces the viewer to root for her success. That would bug me, but The Devil Wears Prada 2 successfully gives journalists a bigger villain to hiss at and resent." Clarisse Loughrey of The Independent wrote that the film "hits painfully home, and perpetual job insecurity is hardly exclusive to the media world. Yet even for those who can't relate, there's still plenty of the indulgent, fondant pleasures to take part in."

In a negative review, Moira MacDonald of The Seattle Times wrote that the film "gives us a lot to look at, and Hathaway and Blunt in particular are a pleasure, but it's flat champagne: maybe worth drinking in a pinch, but unsatisfying." Randy Myers of The Mercury News wrote, "Yes, it is indeed a pleasure to hang out with these characters again, and there are a few good laughs here and there. But The Devil Wears Prada 2 feels like it came off the rack before it was ready. It feels about as groundbreaking as florals in spring." The Globe and Mail's Johanna Schneller opined that, unlike the original film, The Devil Wears Prada 2 "has zero idea what it's about", in particular seeing its social commentary as soft and inconsistent.

=== Accolades ===
Accolades received by The Devil Wears Prada 2
| Award | Date of ceremony | Category | Recipient(s) | Result | Ref. |
|---|---|---|---|---|---|
| Astra Midseason Movie Awards | June 30, 2026 | Best Supporting Actress | Emily Blunt | Nominated | |
| Berlin Commercial Festival | September 9, 2026 | Best Music Video | "Runway" – Lady Gaga and Doechii | Nominated | |
| Berlin Commercial Festival | September 9, 2026 | Craft: Costume Styling | "Runway" – Lady Gaga and Doechii | Won | |
| Berlin Commercial Festival | September 9, 2026 | Craft: Editing | "Runway" – Lady Gaga and Doechii | Nominated | |
| Berlin Commercial Festival | September 9, 2026 | Craft: Idea | "Runway" – Lady Gaga and Doechii | Nominated | |
| Berlin Commercial Festival | September 9, 2026 | Craft: Production Design | "Runway" – Lady Gaga and Doechii | Nominated | |
| BreakTudo Awards | November 24, 2026 | International Music Video | "Runway" – Lady Gaga and Doechii | Pending | |
| Digital Spy Reader Awards | December 28, 2025 | Most Anticipated Movie of 2026 | The Devil Wears Prada 2 | Won | |
| Golden Trailer Awards | May 28, 2026 | Best Summer 2026 Blockbuster Trailer | Runway (20th Century Studios and Requiem) | Nominated | |
| Golden Trailer Awards | May 28, 2026 | Best Teaser | Catwalk (20th Century Studios and Buddha Jones) | Won | |
| Golden Trailer Awards | May 28, 2026 | Best Graphics in a TV Spot | Scroll :30 (20th Century Studios and Buddha Jones) | Nominated | |
| Grammy Awards | February 7, 2027 | Best Pop Duo/Group Performance | "Runway" – Lady Gaga and Doechii | Pending | |
| Grammy Awards | February 7, 2027 | Best Compilation Soundtrack for Visual Media | Various artists | Pending | |
| Grammy Awards | February 7, 2027 | Best Song Written for Visual Media | "Runway" – Andrew Watt, Bruno Mars, Dernst Emile II, Henry Walter, Jayda Love, Jaylah Hickmon, and Stefani Germanotta | Pending | |
| Grindr Unwrapped Awards | December 2026 | Movie of the Year | The Devil Wears Prada 2 | Pending | |
| Grindr Unwrapped Awards | December 2026 | Music Video of the Year | "Runway" – Lady Gaga and Doechii | Pending | |
| Hochi Film Awards | December 2026 | Best International Picture | The Devil Wears Prada 2 | Pending | |
| Hollywood Music in Media Awards | November 18, 2026 | Best Music Supervision – Film | Julia Michels | Won | |
| Kids' Choice Awards | November 14, 2026 | Favorite Movie Actress | Anne Hathaway | Nominated | |
| Kids' Choice Awards | November 14, 2026 | Favorite Villain | Emily Blunt | Nominated | |
| Kids' Choice Awards | November 14, 2026 | Favorite On-Screen Duo or Trio | Meryl Streep and Stanley Tucci | Nominated | |
| Kids' Choice Awards | November 14, 2026 | Favorite Song from a Movie | "Runway" – Lady Gaga and Doechii | Nominated | |
| MTV Video Music Awards | September 27, 2026 | Best Dance | "Runway" – Lady Gaga and Doechii | Nominated | |
| MTV Video Music Awards | September 27, 2026 | Best Art Direction | Freyja Bardell (for "Runway") | Nominated | |
| Nikkan Sports Film Awards | December 27, 2026 | Best Foreign Film | The Devil Wears Prada 2 | Pending | |
| Queerty Awards | March 10, 2026 | Next Big Thing | The Devil Wears Prada 2 | Runner-up | |

== Controversies ==
=== Allegations of racism ===
On April 16, 2026, 20th Century Studios released a clip for the film on its YouTube channel, featuring Hathaway's character Andy alongside her assistant, Jin Chao, (Note: Jin Chao is romanized as Chinese: 秦舟; pinyin: Qín Zhōu; Wade–Giles: Ch'in Chou; Jyutping: Ceon^{4} Zau^{1} in Chinese-language media.) portrayed by Chinese-American actress Helen J. Shen. Shen's character drew criticism for its alleged use of racist tropes, as observers noted that the character's name bore phonetic resemblance to "ching chong", a racial slur historically used to mock the Chinese language and East Asian people. Critics also wrote that the character was portrayed wearing comparatively dowdy clothing and glasses, in contrast to other characters, and was shown reciting her academic achievements, which they interpreted as reinforcing the "nerdy bookworm" stereotype often associated with Asian people. The character's name was initially misreported as "Chin Chou" in a widely circulated social media hearsay, a rendering that more closely resembled the racial slur and further fueled the controversy, particularly in East Asia. The Asian American Foundation (TAAF), an Asian American and Pacific Islander (AAPI) organization, called it “unfortunate that offensive stereotypes continue to color how Asian American communities are perceived today, whether spread intentionally or not.”

In response to the controversy, the writer McKenna stated that the character Jin Chao was named after a childhood friend and is a "very dimensional character", adding that she is her "love letter to all the wonderful Gen Z assistants I've had who are so enterprising and intelligent". Korean-American filmmaker Joseph Kahn pushed back the criticisms, stating "[Jin's] outfit is actually very couture in a film about fashion. Her glasses and hair clips are of the moment. The body shape disparity comes from Anne Hathaway who mandated there would be 'diversity of sizes' which could either be taken as genuine virtue signaling or an actress wanting to be the skinniest and tallest onscreen. Nevertheless, the Asian character is being depicted as a fashionable, striver in the fashion world with typical Gen Z neurodivergency."

=== Italian dubbing ===
Although all the Italian actors who had provided the voices for the original film when it was dubbed reprised their roles for the sequel, some Italian viewers were unsatisfied with the dub. Maria Pia Di Meo, who has voiced Streep's characters in every Italian-dubbed film of hers, was 86 at the time of the release of The Devil Wears Prada 2, ten years older than Streep, and some viewers said she sounded distinctly older than Miranda looked. More generally, some lines took longer to say in Italian than in English, resulting in a lack of synchronization with the characters' mouths.
