= Got the Magic =

Got the Magic may refer to:

- Got the Magic (Celtic Harp Orchestra album), 2003
- Got the Magic (Spyro Gyra album), 1999
