= Becca Bloom =

American entrepreneur and influencer

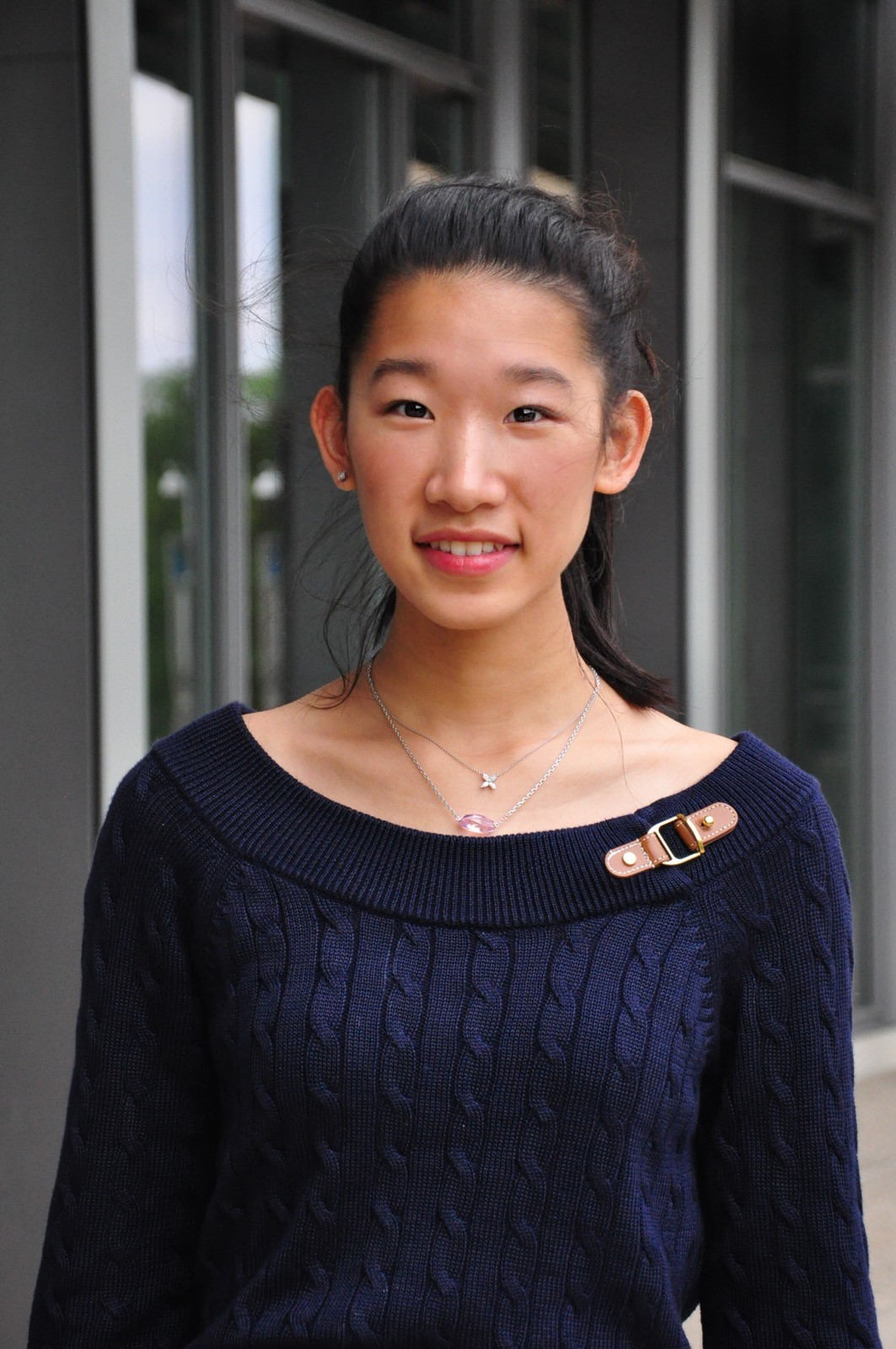
- Ma in 2015
- Born: Rebecca C. Ma
- Education: University of Southern California
- Occupations: Businesswoman; Socialite; Social media personality
- Spouse: David Pownall (m. 2025)

TikTok information
- Page: beccaxbloom
- Followers: 6.3M
- Last updated: November 7, 2026

Rebecca C. Ma, better known as Becca Bloom, is an American entrepreneur, socialite, and social media influencer. She is the co-founder of Hearth Wireless Chargers, and a luxury fashion influencer.

== Early life, family, education ==
In her youth, Ma trained in ballet, played tennis, and competed in Math Olympiad. During high school, she and her family moved to Atherton, California. She attended Menlo School, where she was a member of the Botball team; she graduated in 2017.

She graduated from the University of Southern California with a degree in Business Economics, and a minor in law.

== Career ==
Ma works in the financial technology industry. She co-founded Hearth Wireless Chargers in 2018 and later sold the company.

=== Social media ===
In early 2025, Ma joined multiple social media platforms and amassed over three million followers on TikTok and over 500,000 followers on Instagram. She is a content creator associated with RichTok, a TikTok subculture featuring the lives of wealthy content creators. She has been described as "the queen of RichTok." In July 2025, Ma was included on Time's 100 Best Creators List.

== Personal life ==
Becca Bloom met her husband, software engineer David Pownall in 2019. They became engaged on July 23, 2023 while on a private boat ride in Positano. The couple were married on August 28, 2025 at the Villa Balbiano in Ossuccio, Italy.
