= Ethnoworld =

Ethnoworld is a record label and music publisher established in 2000 and based in Milan. The core genres of its catalogue are ethnic, folk and world music, but over the years Ethnoworld's releases have spanned from jazz to classical, through contemporary (rock, pop, minimalist) music. Among the main acts signed to the label there are (or were) Celtic Harp Orchestra, The Afterglow, F.B.A., Kal Dos Santos, Alexian Group. Despite having worked also with major record companies (notably with E.M.I., BMG Ricordi, Universal and Warner), the label has failed to reach commercial success and today is mainly active as a music publisher. During 2003 edition of the Samonios Festival (Milan), Ethnoworld has been awarded as "Best Folk Label of the Year". Celtic Harp Orchestra "The Myst", The Afterglow "Decalogue of Modern Life" (both originally released in the UK by London-based short lived sister label "Silent Revolution") and F.B.A. "Till the sky shall fall" can be considered the most successful albums released by Ethnoworld, both for critical reception and worldwide circulation.
