= Three Letters to the Moon =

Studio album by Celtic Harp Orchestra
- Released: 2010
- Recorded: 2010
- Genre: Celtic, Fusion, Alternative
- Length: 49:57
- Label: Ethnoworld

Celtic Harp Orchestra chronology
Tale of the Fourth (2008)	Three Letters to the Moon (2010)

Three Letters to the Moon is a studio album by Fabius Constable & Celtic Harp Orchestra, released by Ethnoworld in 2010.

== Background and composition ==
The album was recorded and released in 2010 and follows the ensemble's 2008 release Tale of the Fourth. It is structured conceptually in three parts described as "Letter from the Sleeper", "Letter from the Dreamers" and "Letter from the Inferno"; the latter section includes pieces inspired by Dante Alighieri Inferno and settings referencing the story of Paolo and Francesca. The work blends the harp orchestra with vocal soloists, choir and a small rock trio. Formats include CD and digital availability on major streaming platforms.

== Tracks ==
1. Introitus II
2. Nausicaa's Reflections
3. No Time Nylus
4. Concerning the Theft of an Airliner
5. Luna Shine for me
6. The Infinite Beauty of a Spotless Tofu
7. Almuthada's Bliss
8. Kerry the Kingdom
9. From Another Life
10. Children of Llyr
11. La Porta
12. Paolo + Francesca
13. Bonifacio
14. Dante's Dream

== Personnel ==
Credits on the album include Fabius Constable (director; harp, cello, piano, whistle, accordion), soprano Donatella Bortone, harpists such as Sabrina Noseda and Chiara Vincenzi, choir members and additional instrumentalists (violin, oboe, guitar, percussion). Full credits are listed on the album release page.

== Style and themes ==
The album continues the ensemble's crossover approach—rooted in Celtic harp tradition but incorporating world-music influences, choral textures and contemporary arrangements—and presents a programmatic structure (the three "letters") combining instrumental pieces, vocal settings and choral passages. The Dante-inspired material (for example, "Paolo + Francesca") is directly referenced by track title and liner notes.

== Reception ==
Coverage of the album in major English-language music press is limited. The release is documented on music retail and streaming platforms; user reviews appear on retail sites but there are few indexed professional English-language reviews for this specific release.
