= Villa del Balbiano =

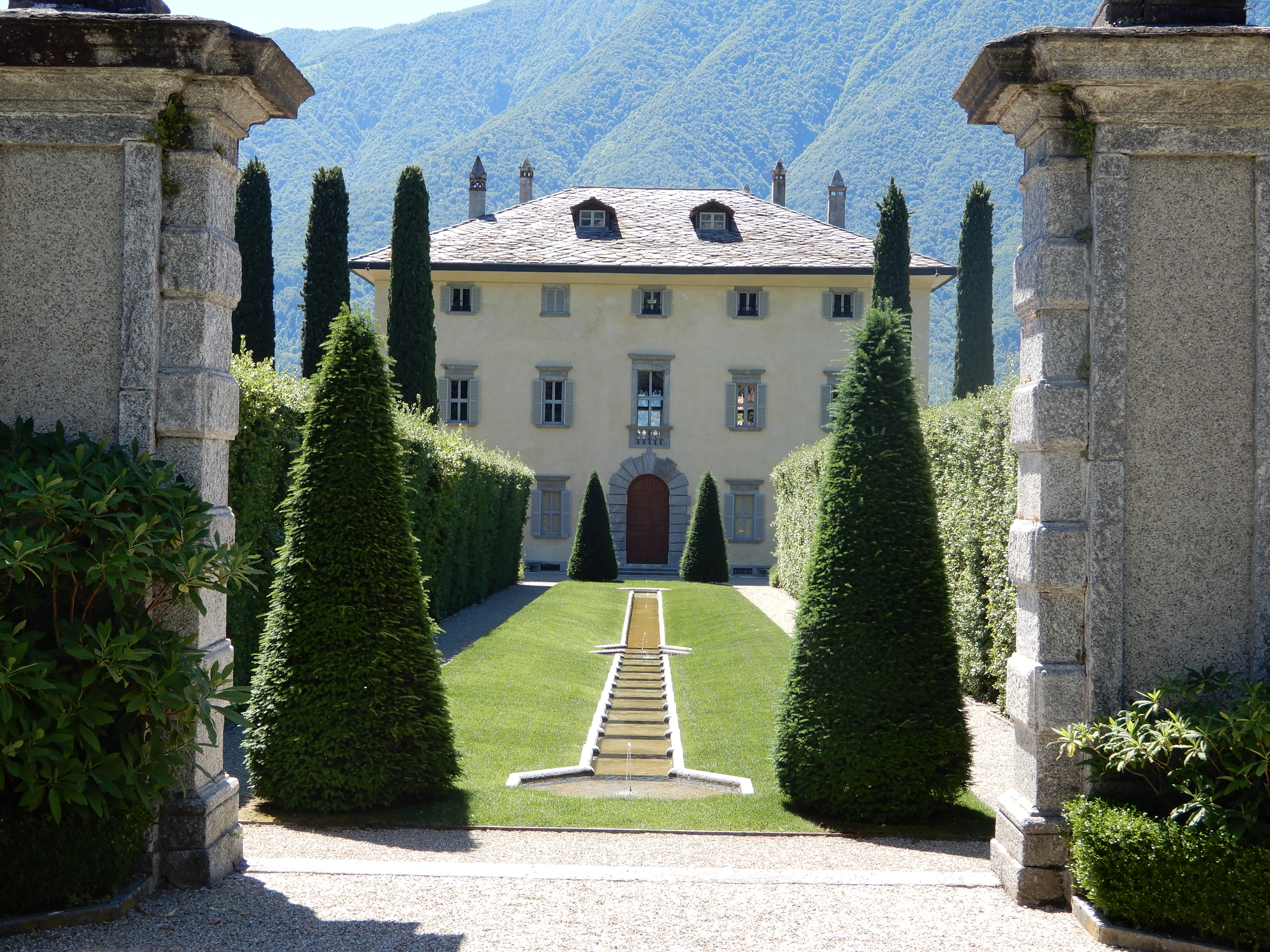
- Interactive map of the Villa del Balbiano area

General information
- Coordinates: 45°58′01.4″N 9°11′11″E

The Villa del Balbiano is a villa in Ossuccio, in Lombardy, Italy.

== History ==
The villa is in the small town of Ossuccio, one of the oldest on Lake Como. The first historical trace of the name Balbiano is found in a document dated 941. The historian Paolo Giovio (1483–1552) wrote of the place where his family possessed magnificent houses and lands planted with mulberries and olives. In 1596, Ottavio Giovio sold the villa to Tolomeo Gallio, who later became the first Duke of Alvito. The idea began to take shape in his mind of building a villa at Balbiano family's new status. There are some doubts as to the name of the architect. the owner of the villa at the end of the eighteenth century, Giovanni Battista Giovio (a descendant of Paolo, and like him a scholar and historian), identified the architect as Pellegrino Pellegrini, known as "Tibaldi". However, no other documents have been found to support this.

In 1637, the owner was Marco Gallio. When he died, on August 13, 1638, the four outer walls of the villa with their gneiss (serizzo) plinth course and most of the partition walls on the three floors had been built, but the finishing work had not been done. Only the cornice had been built for the roof. Ownership of Balbiano then passed into the hands of Carlo Gallio. As we read engraved on an eighteenth-century plaque at the villa, it was Carlo, Marchese of Isola, who continued construction. Another plaque, also from the eighteenth century, says that in 1680, the Marchese Giacomo Gallo celebrated completion of the building, which he had enriched with fine stuccowork and elaborate frescoes, gardens and fountains.

In 1787, Balbiano was acquired by the Cardinal Angelo Maria Durini, art patron and collector. His circle of friends included notable intellectuals in Milan at the time, such as the poet Giuseppe Parini, a leading figure in Italian Neoclassicism, who was often a guest at Balbiano. Durini purchased a number of neighboring properties, commissioned new frescoes, and ordered the construction of a small church, a tower, and a lighthouse to guide the boats (the lighthouse collapsed in the nineteenth century). In a panoramic position atop a promontory to the east, he had a double pavilion built. He dubbed the new estate Balbianino in honor of Balbiano, although today it is better known as Balbianello and is an Italian National Trust (FAI) site.

After several changes of ownership, in 1872 the villa was purchased by an industrialist in textiles, Gustave Salomon Gessner, who expanded the buildings and installed a spinning mill. In the twentieth century the property was broken up. The land to the west was sold, and in the 1930s the building housing the spinning mill was destroyed. In 1940, the parapet and gate on the lake side collapsed into the lake. In 1960, the villa changed hands once again: the new owner was a German engineer, Hermann Hartlaub. He was the one to initiate the first restoration work. Balbiano was bought by Michele Canepa, an industrialist in the silk business, in 1982. He beautified the gardens with new species of trees and flowers, some of which are quite rare. Ownership changed again in 2011. The modernization of the villa was entrusted to the French interior architect Jacques Garcia, with Carlota Proença da Almeida handling structural design and restoration work. Restoration work was undertaken on the first floor to restore the historical decorations. An indoor pool was installed in what used to be a garden shed, and other pool was installed outside. The garden was also restored under the supervision of Colson Stone landscape architects of Somerset, England.

In 2021, the villa was used to film some scenes of the movie "House of Gucci" directed by Ridley Scott.

== Bibliography ==
- ALBERTONI, Ettore Adalberto, cur. I magistri comacini nella storia e per lo sviluppo del Lago di Como e della Valle d’Intelvi. Milan: Libri Scheiwiller, 2006.
- BERTOLOTTI, Davide. Viaggio al lago di Como. C.A. Ostinelli, 1821.
- CANI, Fabio. La Pliniana di Torno: storia di una villa e di un mito sul lago di Como. Como: Alessandro Dominioni Editore, 2010.
- CANI, Fabio and Gerardo Monizza. Como e la sua storia: dalla preistoria all’attualità. Como: NodoLibri, 1999.
- COPES, Cristian and Guido Scaramellini. Il Balbiano: un palazzo a Ossuccio. Una dimora dei Gallio sul lago di Como sorta su magni che rovine cinquecentesche. Como: Enzo Pifferi Editore, 2012.
- COSTANZA FATTORI, Lionello. “Architetture neoclassiche nel territorio comasco.” Arte lombarda. Milan: Vita e Pensiero. 1980.
- DETTAMANTI, Pietro.Viaggio al lago di Como: letterati e viaggiatori dell’Ottocento sul Lario (vol. 78). Moncalieri (TO): C.I.R.V.I., 2007.
- Fondo Acchiappati – inventario d’archivio. City of Como historical archives, 2002.
- GEDDO, Christina, ed. Omaggio al cardinale Angelo Maria Durini, mecenate di lettere ed arti. Papers from the conference at the Biblioteca Braidense, Milan, January 26, 2012. Contributions by C. Capra, C. Geddo, S. Graciotti, F. Milani, M. Natale, and W. Spaggiari. Novara: Poligra ca moderna, 2013. GIOVIO, Paolo. La descrizione del Lario. Milan: Edizioni Il Poli lo, 2007.
- GROS, Pierre et Mario Torelli. Storia dell’urbanistica. Il mondo romano. Rome: Editori Laterza, 2007.
- LURASCHI, Giorgio. Storia di Como antica. Cermenate (CO): New Press Edizioni, 1997.
- MODIGLIANI, Reuben, Villa Balbiano: Italian Opulence on Lake Como, Paris: 2018.
- PERON, Ettore Maria. Storia di Como dalle origini ai giorni nostri. Pordenone: Edizioni Biblioteca dell’Immagine, 2017.
- PIFFERI, Enzo and Giuseppe Rasi. Ville e giardini del lago di Como. Como: Enzo Pifferi Editore, 2005.
- PREVITERA, Maria Angela, Serena Bertolucci and Maria Fratelli. Novecento sul lago di Como. Pittura tra acque e monti. Milan: Editore Nexo, 2013. RIZZINI, Marialuisa. “Note sul collezionismo seicentesco: la famiglia Gallio di Como,” Arte Lombarda. Milan: Vita e Pensiero, 1991.
- ZIMMERMANN, T. C. Paolo Giovio. Uno storico e la crisi italiana del XVI secolo. Milan: Lampi di Stampa, 2012.

== See also ==
- Paolo Giovio
- Tolomeo Gallio
- Pellegrino Tibaldi
- Angelo Maria Durini
- Villa del Balbianello
