= Calum Harper =

British model (born 2002)

- Born: Calum Jensen Harper; 18 July 2002 (age 24); Gloucester, England
- Occupations: Model; influencer
- Years active: 2022–present
- Modeling information
- Height: 1.86 m (6 ft 1 in)
- Hair color: Red
- Eye color: Blue
- Agency: Marilyn Agency; Fashion Model Management; Modelwerk; Public Image Management; Menace Model Management

Calum Jensen Harper (born 18 July 2002) is a British fashion model and social media influencer. He made his runway debut in 2022 at London Fashion Week walking for British-Chinese label Mithridate. He is best known for blending runway work in high fashion with authenticity on social media.

== Early life ==
Harper was born on 18 July 2002 in Gloucester, England. He grew up with an interest in performance and creativity, including acting and theatre during his youth.

== Career ==
Harper began pursuing a modelling career in 2020 during the COVID-19 pandemic after initially moving to London to pursue acting and attending drama school. After switching to Menace Model Management, he made his runway debut in 2022 at London Fashion Week, walking for British-Chinese label Mithridate. In 2023, during Milan Fashion Week, he walked for major luxury houses including Gucci, Zegna, Hermès and MSGM. He made his magazine cover for Flanelle Magazine in early 2025. He walked for the Diesel Spring/Summer 2025 runway show. In 2025, British Vogue named him one of the "most successful male models of all time" with other 22 models.

Harper has starred in multiple global campaigns for Karl Lagerfeld, including the Spring/Summer 2025 campaign and the Fall/Winter 2024 campaign photographed by Chris Colls, appeared in advertising work for Kenneth Cole as part of his commercial brand portfolio and been featured in campaigns for Tommy Hilfiger. Harper made his acting debut in a fashion film The Devil Wears Prada 2. In May 2026, he was featured as a guest judge in the penultimate episode of the season of Germany's Next Topmodel with Manon Bannerman. He made his magazine cover for Numéro Netherlands in June 2026.

== Filmography ==
=== Film ===
Year	Title	Role	Notes
2026	The Devil Wears Prada 2	Party guest	Supporting role

=== Television ===
Year	Title	Role	Notes
2026	Germany's Next Topmodel	Himself	Guest Judge
