= Luigi Porro Lambertenghi =

Italian nationalist, businessman and politician

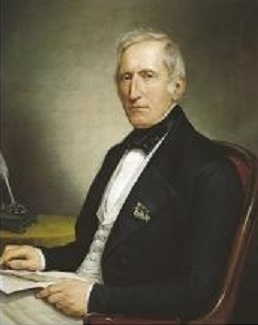
Portrait of Luigi Porro Lambertenghi, oil on canvas, modern art gallery, Milan

Count Luigi Renato Porro-Lambertenghi (July 12, 1780 in Como – February 9, 1860 in Milan) was an Italian nationalist, businessman, and politician. He was the son of politician and essayist Luigi Lambertenghi (1739–1813).

He inherited Villa del Balbianello in 1796 from his uncle, Cardinal Angelo Maria Durini. Among his guests were Silvio Pellico, who tutored Lambertenghi's two sons there. He was forced to leave Italy in March 1821, while in Milan, as the Austrian police were rounding up everyone suspected of conspiring against the government. His escape was effected by Timothy Yeats Brown, who drove out of Milan with Lambertenghi disguised as his footman. He fled to Geneva, and made his way to England in early 1822 via Paris, where Yeats Brown vouched for him at the Alien Office. When he was forced to leave Italy, Lambertenghi sold the villa to his friend, Giuseppe Visconti di Modrone, grandfather of Luchino Visconti.

Lambertenghi's grandson, Count Giulio Porro-Lambertenghi, was among the dignitaries who attended the Canonization of Joan of Arc.
