= Celtic Harp Orchestra =

Italian musical ensemble

- Orchestra
- Founded: 2002
- Location: Como, Italy
- Website: Arpaceltica.com

The Celtic Harp Orchestra (CHO), founded in 2002 by Fabius Constable, is a musical formation composed primarily of lever harps, or Celtic harps, as they are commonly known, alongside other instruments such as cello, violin, flute, accordion, guitar, bass, drums, soprano voice and choir. As of June 2018 CHO has released seven albums currently distributed by the label Ignorelands. The musicians who are part of this project form an interesting and harmonious heterogeneous group, aged between 17 and 60 years. In full, the formation numbers 16 harpists, of whom 12 are women. An important role in characterizing the sound of the Celtic Harp Orchestra goes to the voice of soprano Donatella Bortone, who joined the group in 2003, after having worked with Fabius Constable in an earlier project, "Fir Soar", CHO is considered the largest Celtic harp orchestra in Europe.

== History ==
On July 4, 2002, during the International Festival of Art, culture, and Music, "Celtica", on a stage set up in the woods of Peuterey, at the foot of Mont Blanc, a group called Harpe Diem performed for the first time. It was an extemporized formation of 44 harpists of all levels, from beginners to internationally acclaimed musicians, such as Briton Myrdhin, who had accepted the invitation of Fabius Constable to play harp together. The concert was held in front of 4000 people. This first success was the beginning of the history of the Celtic Harp Orchestra. The group was then organized. A repertoire, initially composed of ancient melodies and traditional Irish music, was selected and the orchestra began to rehearse and perform together.

Since then, Celtic Harp Orchestra has given many concerts in Italy (at Auditorium Parco della Musica in Rome, in various conservatories and universities, including Bocconi, the Compagnia Humanitaria in Milan, Villa Erba, Villa Olmo, Villa Balbianello on Lake Como, Vittoriale degli Italiani, the festival Mi.To.) and abroad with concerts in Spain, Switzerland, France, Ireland (at Trinity College in Dublin), Germany, Britain, China, Japan and Korea. Alongside touring there has been an intensive recording activity, that led to the release of four albums.

== Discography ==
=== Got the Magic ===
The first album, Got the Magic was released in 2003 and is a "live concert without an audience", organized by Svana Sound Recordings at Rocca Brivio Sforza, a villa of the 17th century, surrounded by an impressive park, not far from Milan. The sounds on the CD were left unchanged: there were no cuts and no equalizations in the post-production. In the background, are distinctly audible the sounds of nature, that come to be part of the music, in which harping and traditional tunes are predominant.

=== The Myst ===
In the spring of 2005, The Myst was produced: an expression of the musical and personal evolution of the group. It was the first real session in a recording studio for the orchestra. Amplifying and recording parts for such a large number of harps, as well as other instruments ("The Myst" saw the cooperation of nearly 40 musicians, including guest stars) required over 200 hours of hard work at Suonovivo Studios, near Bergamo. This second release gives room to a more diverse repertoire, comprising some rearranged traditional tunes and original compositions by Fabius Constable, echoing the most various influences, from tango to classical music, from folk to more introspective songs, like "A bigger Dream" and the title track "The Myst".

=== Tale of the Fourth ===
In 2008, the Celtic Harp Orchestra released the third CD, Tale of the Fourth: a concept album related to the Fibonacci sequence of numbers. It represents a further change in musical style, as some of the new tracks were composed while Fabius Constable was on tour in the Far East, and later rearranged with the addition of a typical rock trio: electric guitar, bass guitar, and drums. This recording session was held at Auditoria Records, near Como, paving the way for a lasting collaboration with producer Aki Chindamo. The third album, although containing some Irish classics, including Constable’s variations of "Greensleeves" and "O'Carolan's Concerto", is far from the canons of traditional music. Harp sound, which is strongly distinctive of CHO, is interpreted and mixed innovatively, with sounds such as Moog and Hammond. An experiment that was worth the nomination of Tale of the Fourth for best album and best recording at Prog Academy Awards in 2008.

=== Three Letters to the Moon ===
The intense touring of the next two years, gave birth, in 2010, to Three Letters to the Moon. The first part of the CD, Letter From The Sleeper, contains solo compositions by Fabius Constable. It emphasizes a more intimate and reflective style, resembling influences of Japanese, North African, and Celtic music. The second part, Letter From The Dreamers, has a massive sound impact, with the orchestra to the full, the presence of the choir, and the rock trio, already successfully tested in Tale of the Fourth. In the Letter from Inferno, finally, some new compositions are presented, never recorded before, but often performed during live shows, with enthusiastic response from the audience. They are compositions of part of the Dante's Dream Project, by Fabius Constable and Donatella Bortone, in which some of the most famous poems of Dante's Inferno (such as the V canto, with the moving love story of Paolo and Francesca) were set to music.

== Discography ==
- 2003 – Got the Magic (Ethnoworld)
- 2005 – The Myst (Ethnoworld)
- 2008 – Tale of the Fourth (Ethnoworld)
- 2010 – Three Letters to the Moon (Ethnoworld)
