= Angelo Maria Durini =

Italian Cardinal

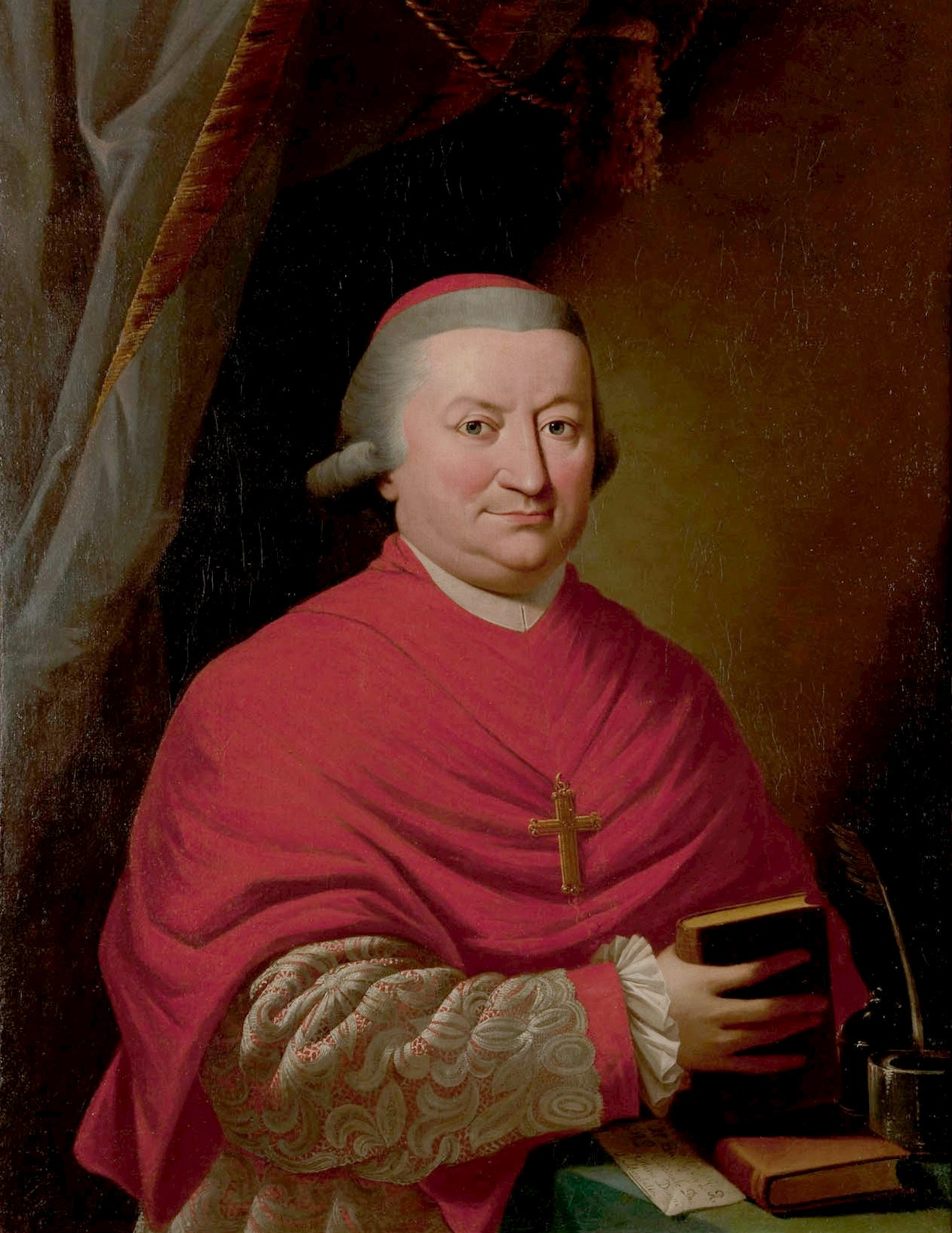
Angelo Maria Durini

Angelo Maria Durini (29 May 1725 – 28 April 1796) was an Italian Cardinal of the Roman-Catholic Church.

Durini was born in Milan. After studying in Rome and receiving the grade of a doctor, he worked in the papal nunciature in Paris. He was part of the Roman Curia and nuncio in Poland. From 1774 to 1776, Durini lived in Avignon. On 20 May 1776, Pope Pius VI made him Cardinal.

As Cardinal Durini was an important patron of the arts, his villa Balbianello on lake Como became a frequent venue for the most exclusive intellectual and social gatherings of the time.

On one famous occasion, the Cardinal served the first coffee in Italy, which was called "thé nero francese" (French black tea).

He died in his villa on Lake Como (the Villa Balbianello) in 1796. The villa passed to his nephew, Luigi Porro Lambertenghi.

== Villa Balbianello ==
The villa was built in 1787 on the site of a Franciscan monastery for the Cardinal Angelo Maria Durini. The two towers which can be seen in the picture are the campanili of the convent church.

A number of feature films have used the villa for location shooting, including A Month by the Lake (1995), Casino Royale (2006). The villa was also used for the lake retreat scenes in Star Wars: Episode II Attack of the Clones (2002); however, CGI was used in place of the building's true exterior.
