= Got the Magic (Celtic Harp Orchestra album) =

Studio album by Celtic Harp Orchestra
- Released: 2003
- Recorded: 2003
- Genre: Celtic, Folk
- Length: 54:27
- Label: Ethnoworld

Celtic Harp Orchestra chronology
Got the Magic (2003)	The Myst (2005)

Got the Magic is the first studio by Celtic Harp Orchestra, released by Ethnoworld in 2003.

== Tracks ==
1. An Analarc'h
2. Morrison Jig
3. With this Love
4. Brian Boru's March
5. Suil a Ruin
6. The Shrine
7. Children of Llyr
8. Miss Mc Dermot
9. Me, You & Bathroom
10. Mon
11. Let It Wait
12. Morrison Jig(alt. take)
13. She Once Smiled

== Musicians ==
Fabius Constable: Director, Harp

Donatella Bortone: Soprano

Sabrina Noseda: Harp
Chiara Vincenzi: Harp
Pauline Fazzioli: Harp
Ludwig Constable: Harp
Antonella d'Apote: Harp
Rossana Monico: Harp
Maria Assunta Romeo: Harp
Patrizia Borromeo: Harp
Adriano Sangineto: Harp
Caterina Sangineto: Harp
Alaits Andonegi: Harp
Azzurra Giudici: Harp
Elena Sambin: Harp
Gabriella Villa: Harp
Antonio Callea: Harp, Flute
Nicolò Righi: Harp
Maria Fraschini: Harp
Marzia Leccese: Harp
Francesco Accardo: Harp
Laura Scarpelli: Harp
Elisa Nicotra: Harp
Matteo Barni: Harp
Daniela Calò: Harp
Myriam Peverelli: Harp
Sarah Barni: Harp
Mirella Giuliani: Harp
Daniela Mancini: Harp
Donatella Ingesti: Harp
Laura Mainardi: Harp
Elisa Esposto: Harp
Giancarlo Rabericati: Harp
Ilenia Vietri: Harp
Elvezia Degli Esposti: Harp

Massimo Cerra: Oboe

Daniele Bicego: Uilleann pipes

Maurizio Berti: Percussion
Valerio Meletti: Percussion

Marco Carenzio: Guitar
