= The Afterglow =

Italian rock band

- Origin: Turin, Italy
- Genres: Indie rock Rock; Pop
- Years active: 1998–present
- Labels: Silent Revolution Ltd / EMI Publishing UK
- Members: Dave Timson; Vocals, Bass Guitar, Acoustic Guitars; Mik Lennard; Guitars, Piano, Programming, Backing Vocals; Alex Cherry; Drums
- Past members: Alberto Garau 2001; 2008-2012; Guitar; Michael Madsen 2006–2007; Bass Guitar

The Afterglow are an Italian rock band with clear English influences founded in 1998.

== History ==
Founder members the half-English frontman Dave Timson and guitarist Mik Lennard, who started the band in 1998. After a few line up changes drummer Alex Cherry, joined in 2002. The band decided to base themselves partially in Italy and partially in the UK on account of their sound which it was felt was more akin to an English four-piece than to a typical Italian band. Timson's ability to write and speak fluent English on account of a Sheffield-born mother was the principal reason for this. From 2004 to 2010 The Afterglow have been managed by Ethnoworld/Silent Revolution partner and managing director Valerio Meletti.

Their first official four-Track EP Modern Life Virus was published by the London-based record label Silent Revolution Ltd (who discovered the band after getting a copy of their previous unofficial EP) in 2004, with the release of debut single Journey. Their second Ep Love's The Cure (2005) contained the single Love, receiving much critical acclaim in both the UK and Italy and featured on MTV. This was the first release from the band after they had signed to EMI Publishing UK. 2006 proved to be a fundamental year for the band, extensively on tour in both Italy and United Kingdom, when their debut album Decalogue Of Modern Life mixed by Steve Orchard (U2, Travis, McCartney, Coldplay), was released in November. The album received airplays across the world including the UK, US, Canada, Australia, Italy and other European countries, while the third single Setting Sun was broadcast on MTV amongst others. Following the departure of former bassist David Madson, the band kept playing live as a three-piece including appearing at the HUB Festival In Liverpool for the third consecutive year, with Timson taking the role of singer-bass player. The band settled on their current four-piece lineup in May 2008, when they welcomed back former guitarist Alberto Garau (who had had a stint with the band in 2001).

The band released their second studio album Sorry, in June 2009. The album has been recorded and mixed at Suonovivo Studios (Bergamo, Milan) by Dario Ravelli (mix assistant for the first album), and production was assigned to Dave Timson and Mik Lennard.

On 2 February, anticipating the album's worldwide release, five different singles were taken and launched in different countries (US, UK, Italy, Japan, Australia) where the band had been successful with their debut album. The release of Sorry was followed by a promotional tour in which the band played in several well known UK venues (such as 'The Fly', in London, 'The Cavern', in Liverpool and 'The Classic Grand' in Glasgow). During that tour, the band played their first live gigs in Belgium (the Beursschouwburg in Brussels among the others) and The Netherlands.

All of You (Piss me off), Merry-Go-Round, Your heart plastic skin became video tapes directed by Davide Valle, a young and talented film-maker who followed the band all along their European tour. Sorry's latest single ("Before the Afternoon") has been widely airplayed on many international radios, all across Europe (Virgin Radio-Italy-, XFM-UK-, BBC6-UK- to name but a few).

Sorry recently reached the considerable number of 20,000 downloaded copies.

In May 2011, the band's website announced a new side-project called Adam Frei, launched by Rat Singer, an ironic, politically incorrect animated videoclip.

In 2012, after three and a half years of activity with the band, Alberto left for professional reasons, to dedicate his full efforts to other projects. The band decided to keep going as a trio.

In 2018, after fifteen years, Alex Cherry left the band to dedicate himself to a solo project.

In june 2024, after being away for 6 years, Alex Cherry rejoined the band as drummer.

== Discography ==
=== Albums ===
- Decalogue of modern life (2006, Silent Revolution Ltd/EMI Publishing UK) - Produced by The Afterglow, recorded by Dario Ravelli, mixed by Steve Orchard, mastered by Kevin Metcalfe.
- Sorry. (2009, Doublemind Records Ltd/EMI Publishing UK/Ethnoworld Publishing) - Produced by The Afterglow, recorded and mixed by Dario Ravelli, mastered by William Halfpenny.
- Things I’ve Lost 2004-2013 The Greatest Hits
- Strong Words Softly Spoken (2015, Ignoreland)
- Gemini (2020, Ignoreland)

=== EPs ===
- Modern Life Virus(2004, Silent Revolution Ltd) - Produced by The Afterglow, mixed by Dario Ravelli.
- Love's The Cure (2005, Silent Revolution Ltd/EMI Publishing UK) - Produced by The Afterglow, mixed by Dario Ravelli.
- Pills, Parents And Pigs (2014)

=== Singles ===
- "I Still Go" (November 2012 Ethnoworld/EMI) – recorded and produced by Steve Orchard, Smokehouse Studios, London.
- "X- Song" (April 2013 Ethnoworld/EMI) – recorded & produced by Steve Orchard, Smokehouse Studios, Londonprecedes the release of “things i’ve lost”, a collection of past hits out this September!
- "Everything" (November 2013 Ethnoworld/EMI)
- "Fuckinbloody Young / Rage" (February 2019 The Afterglow)
