= Tale of the Fourth =

Studio album by Celtic Harp Orchestra
- Released: 2008
- Recorded: 2008
- Genre: Celtic, Fusion, Progressive Rock
- Length: 41:30
- Label: Ethnoworld

Celtic Harp Orchestra chronology
The Myst (2005)	Tale of the Fourth (2008)	Three Letters to the Moon (2010)

Tale of the Fourth is the fourth CD produced by the Celtic Harp Orchestra, released by Ethnoworld in 2008.

The album consists of three parts: "Tale of the Fourth," "Variations" and "Other Numbers". The first part, "Tale of the Fourth", contains a suite of five songs written and composed according to the Fibonacci sequence. The second part, "Variations", is made of four traditional tunes, rearranged in the peculiar style of Celtic Harp Orchestra. The last part, "Other Numbers," contains three tracks composed by Constable.

== Tracks ==
1. Fibonacci's Primacy
2. Ghost in the Shell
3. Interlude
4. Solve
5. Coagula
6. On Greensleeves
7. Carolan's Concerto
8. On Morrison Jig
9. On the Green Fields of Rossbeg
10. Ling Ling met a Saint in Wonderland
11. Nausicaa
12. Entree

== Musicians ==
Fabius Constable : Director, Cello, Harp, Piano.

Donatella Bortone: Soprano

Sabrina Noseda: Harp
Chiara Vincenzi: Harp
Danilo Marzorati: Harp
Pauline Fazzioli: Harp
Federica Maestri: Harp
Nicolò Righi: Harp
Antonella d'Apote : Harp
Silla Orlando: Harp
Patrizia Rossi: Harp
Eleonora Latis: Harp
Teodora Cianferoni: Harp
Giada Giorgia Pederzolli : Harp
Erika Molteni: Harp
Chiara Rolla: Harp
Lidia Morra: Harp
Daniela Morittu: Harp
Rossana Monico: Harp
Maria Assunta Romeo: Harp

Filippo Pedretti: Violin
Tommaso Latis: Violin

Paolo Pigni: Bass guitar

Luca Briccola: Guitars

Mirko Soncini: Drum, Percussion, Tubular bells

Bernardo Ruggiero: Choir
Riccardo Tabbì: Choir
Anne Delaby: Choir
Irene Casartelli: Choir
