= Villa del Balbianello =

Villa in Lenno, Italy

Coordinates: 45°57′54″N 9°12′09″E

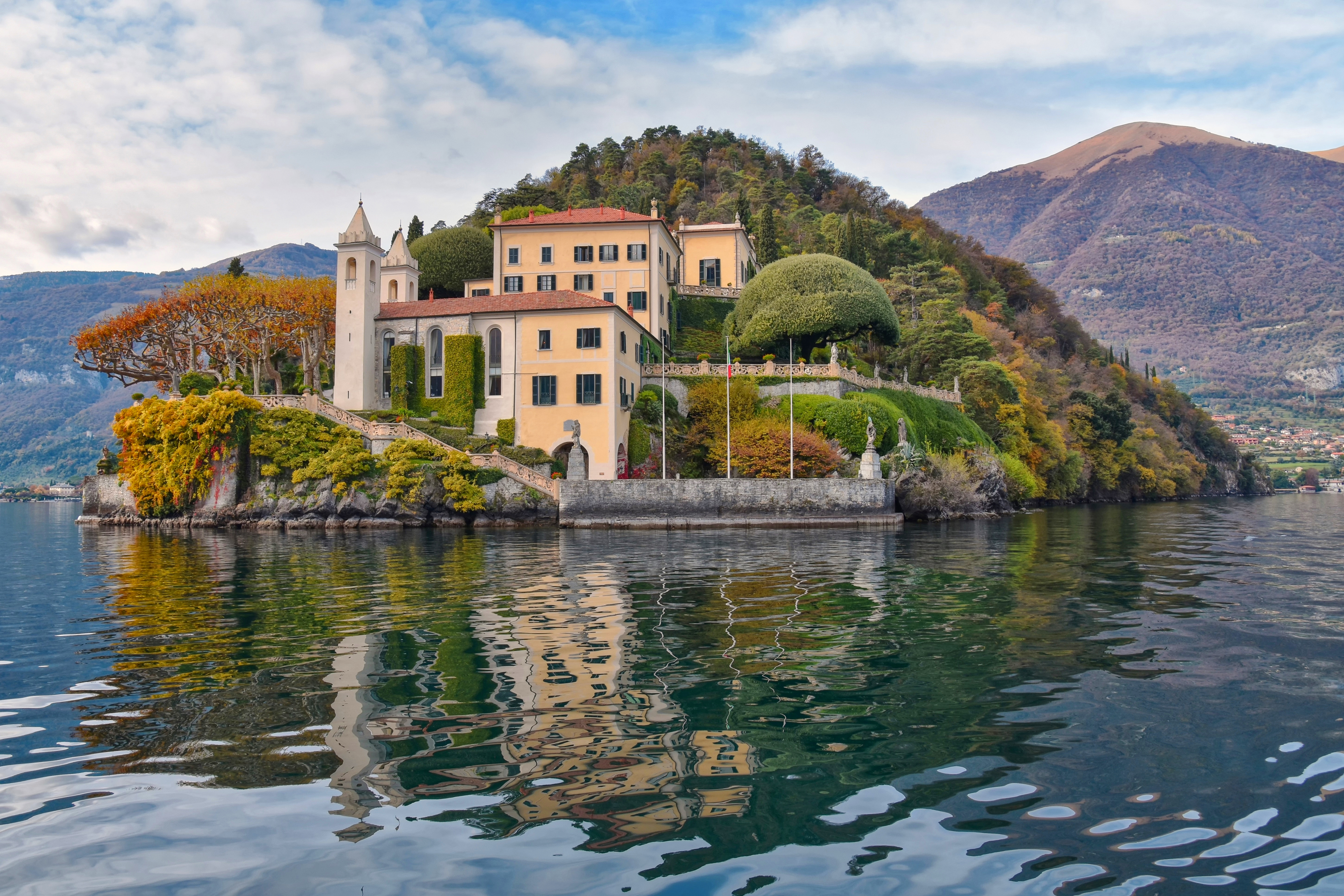
The Villa del Balbianello

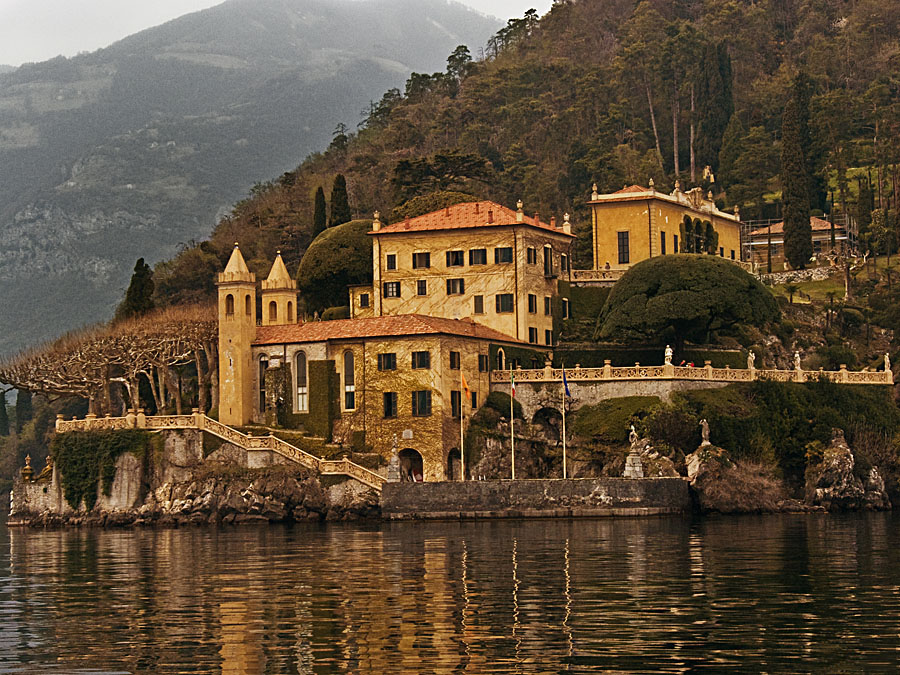
The Villa del Balbianello

The Villa del Balbianello is a villa in the comune of Lenno (province of Como), a province in the north of the Lombardy region of Italy, overlooking Lake Como. It is located on the tip of the small wooded peninsula of Dosso d'Avedo on the western shore of the south-west branch of Lake Como, 1500 metres east from the Isola Comacina. The villa is famous for its elaborate terraced gardens.

== History ==
A Franciscan monastery had existed on the tip of the peninsula of Dosso d'Avedo since the 13th century. The two towers which remain on the property are the remnants of the campanili of the monastery's church.

After failing in his attempts to buy the nearby Isola Comacina, Cardinal Angelo Maria Durini purchased this property in 1785. In 1787, he converted the monastery structure into a villa for use during the summer and added a loggia, which allowed viewers to obtain two different panoramas of the lake.

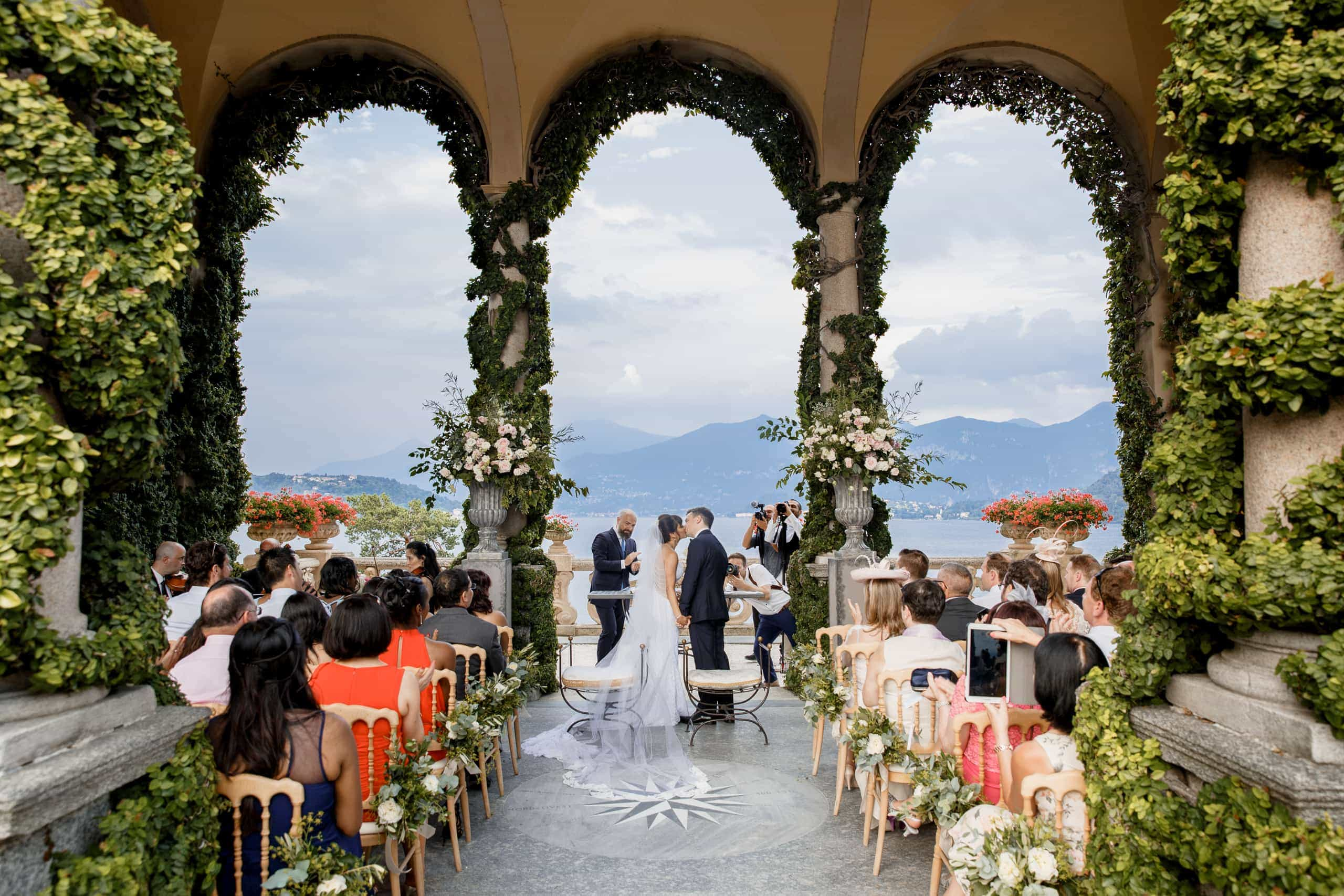
Wedding at Villa del Balbianello overlooking Lake Como

After the cardinal’s death in 1796, the villa passed to his nephew, Luigi Porro Lambertenghi. During his ownership, the villa became a centre for republican activity and meetings, where Italian patriots and Carbonari met. Among Lambertenghi's guests at the villa was the writer Silvio Pellico, who tutored Lambertenghi's sons. In 1820, Pellico was arrested by the Austrian government, and Lambertenghi was forced to move to Belgium, where he was supported by the Arconati-Visconti family. Lambertenghi subsequently sold the villa to his friend, Giuseppe Arconati Visconti.

Visconti made improvements to its gardens and the loggia. To this day, the balustrade in front of the church bears the Visconti emblem of a serpent with a man in its mouth. During the period of Visconti ownership, the villa hosted politicians and writers Giovanni Berchet, Alessandro Manzoni, Giuseppe Giusti, as well as the artist Arnold Böcklin. The gradual decline of the family resulted in a neglect of the villa for more than 30 years.

Just prior to World War I, American businessman Butler Ames saw the villa for the first time. He made an offer to purchase it from the Arconati Visconti family and was initially rejected. He kept returning with ever-larger cash offers, until in 1919 he was successful in obtaining ownership. Ames renovated the villa and its garden.

In 1974, Ames's heirs sold the villa to businessman and explorer Count Guido Monzino (leader of the first Italian expedition to climb Mount Everest). While Monzino left the exterior essentially unchanged, he had the interior of the villa completely re-decorated, installing artefacts acquired on his expeditions as well as important pieces of English Georgian and French antique furniture from the 18th and 19th centuries, Beauvais tapestries, French boiseries and Oriental carpets. After the assassination of Aldo Moro in 1978 by the Red Brigades, Monzino became worried about his safety, and added a system of hidden passages, linking parts of the property.

Monzino died in 1988 and left the villa along with most of the Dosso d'Avedo and an endowment to pay for maintenance, to the Fondo Ambiente Italiano (FAI), the National Trust of Italy. Its grounds now form part of the Grandi Giardini Italiani. Today, the Villa del Balbianello is the most visited among the 52 FAI properties with over 135,000 visitors in 2019.

In 2016, the Fondo per l'Ambiente Italiano commenced a €413,000 project to restore and improve the villa’s jetty, install new signage, new security, emergency lighting and fire prevention systems. The villa's existing diesel fuel system will be replaced with a modern heating system, new visitors bathrooms and drainage systems, and improvements to the bookshop and ticket office space.

== Film appearances ==
A number of feature films have used the villa for location shooting, including A Month by the Lake (1995) and Casino Royale (2006). The villa was also used for the lake retreat scenes in Star Wars: Episode II Attack of the Clones (2002), with computer-generated imagery used in place of the building's true exterior.

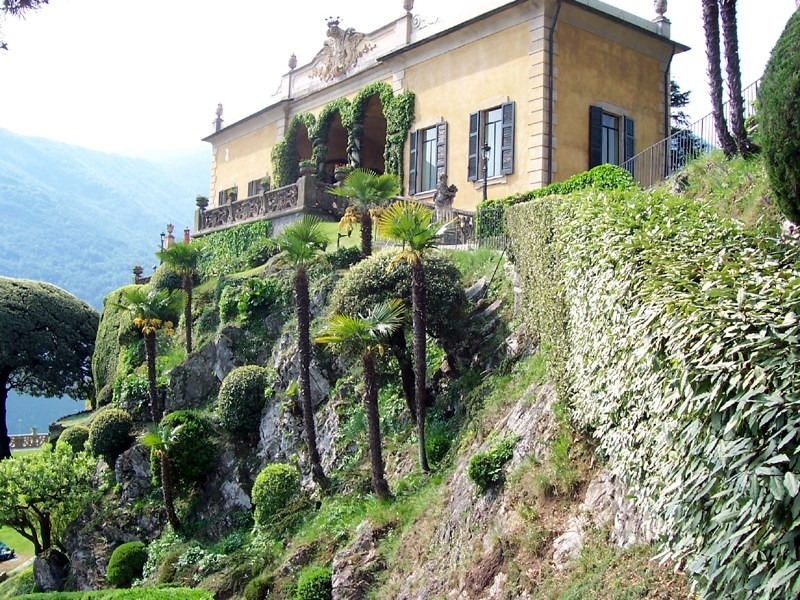

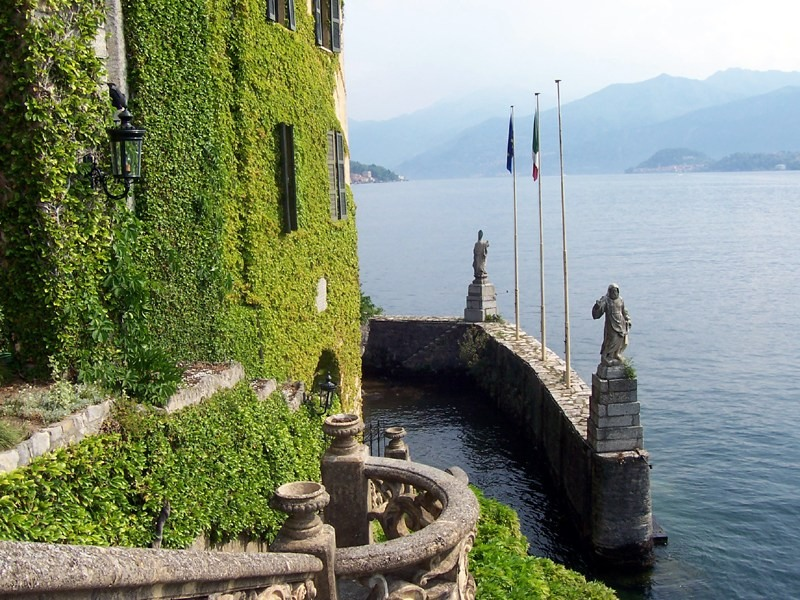

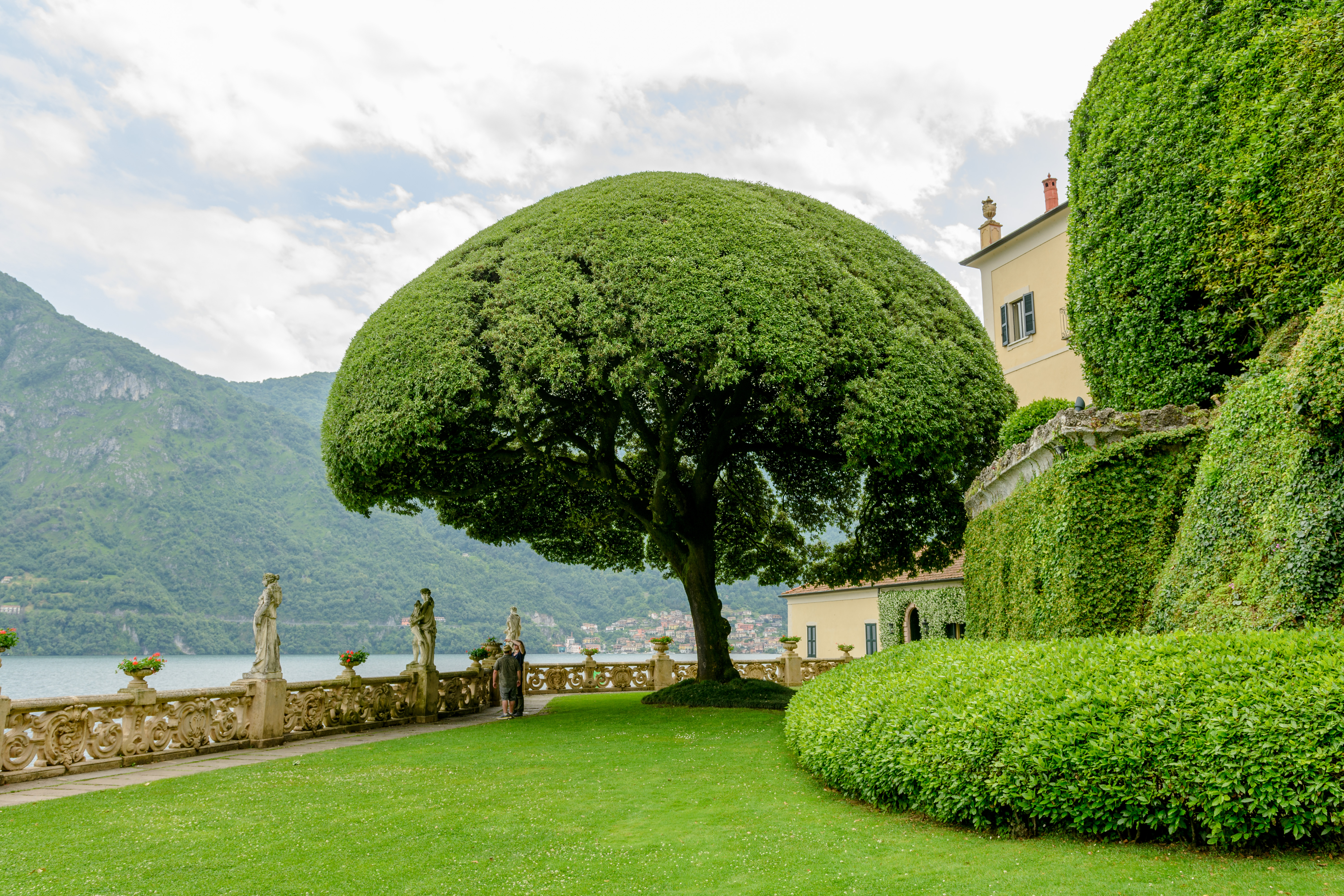

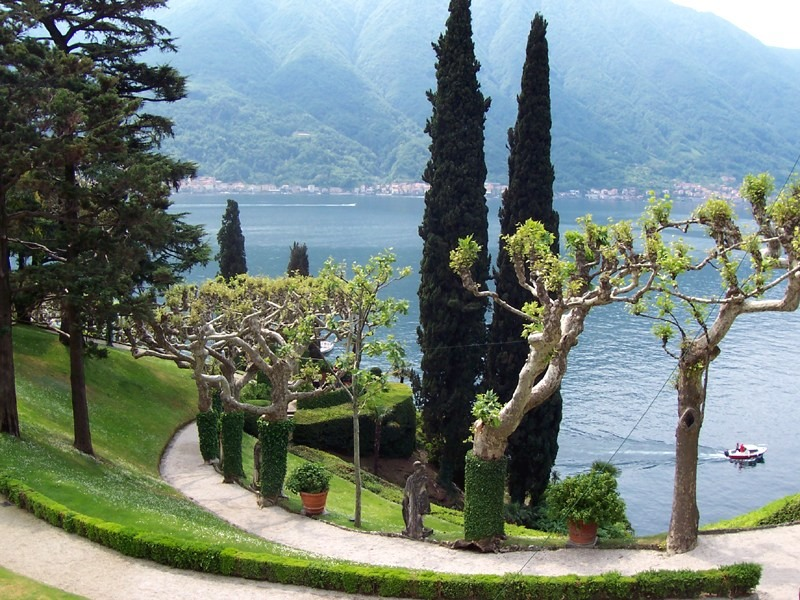

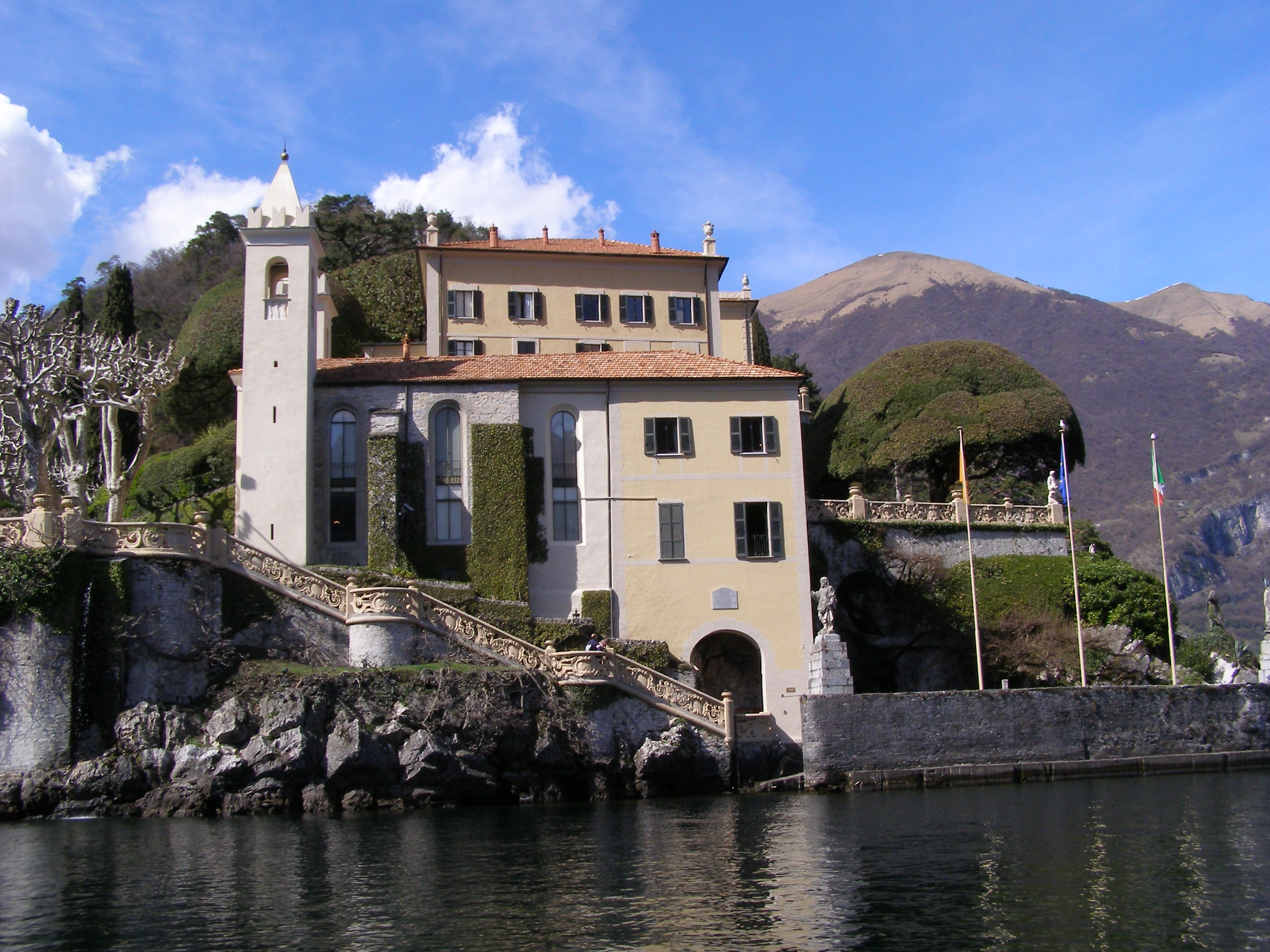

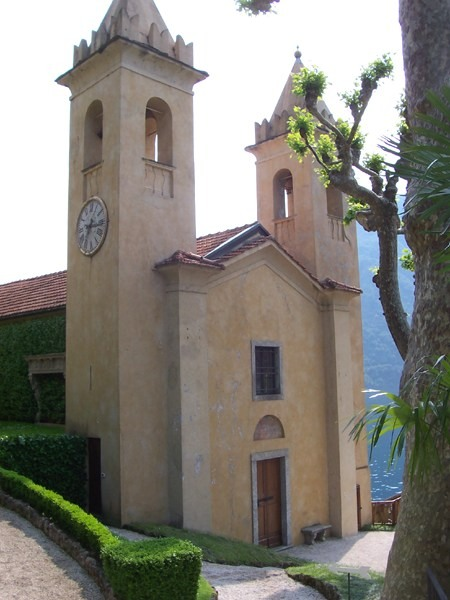

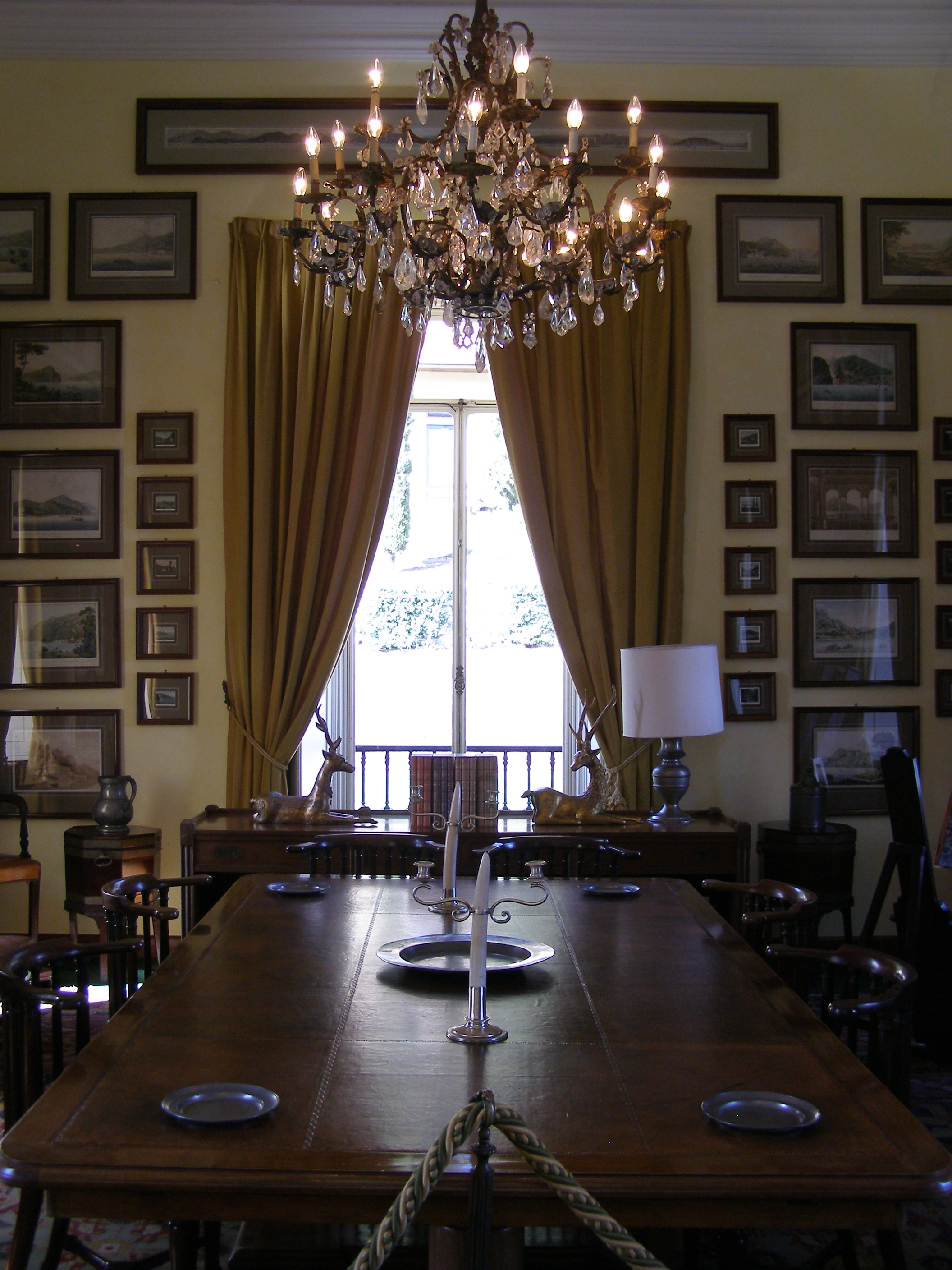
Villa del Balbianello

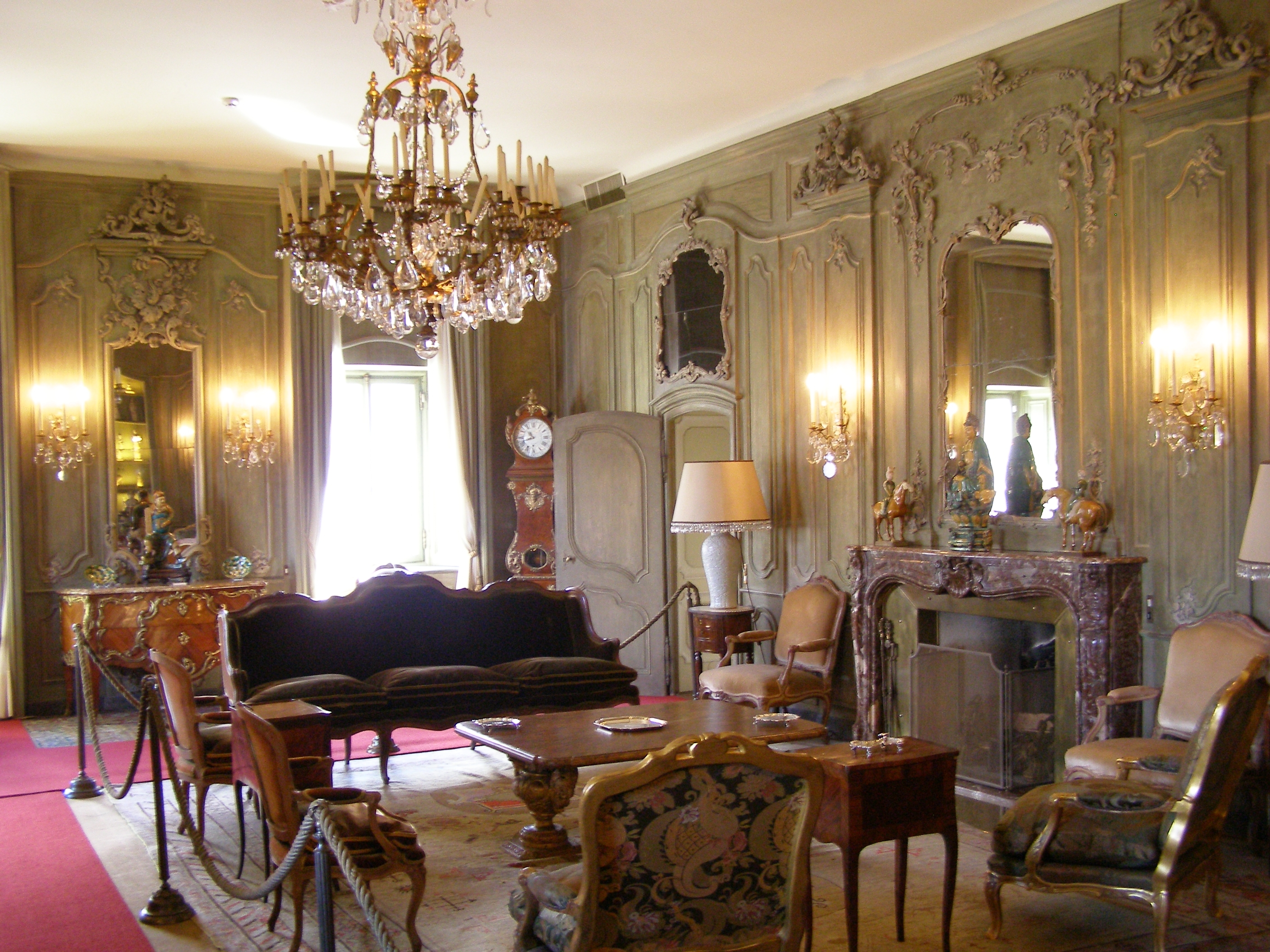
Lenno Villa

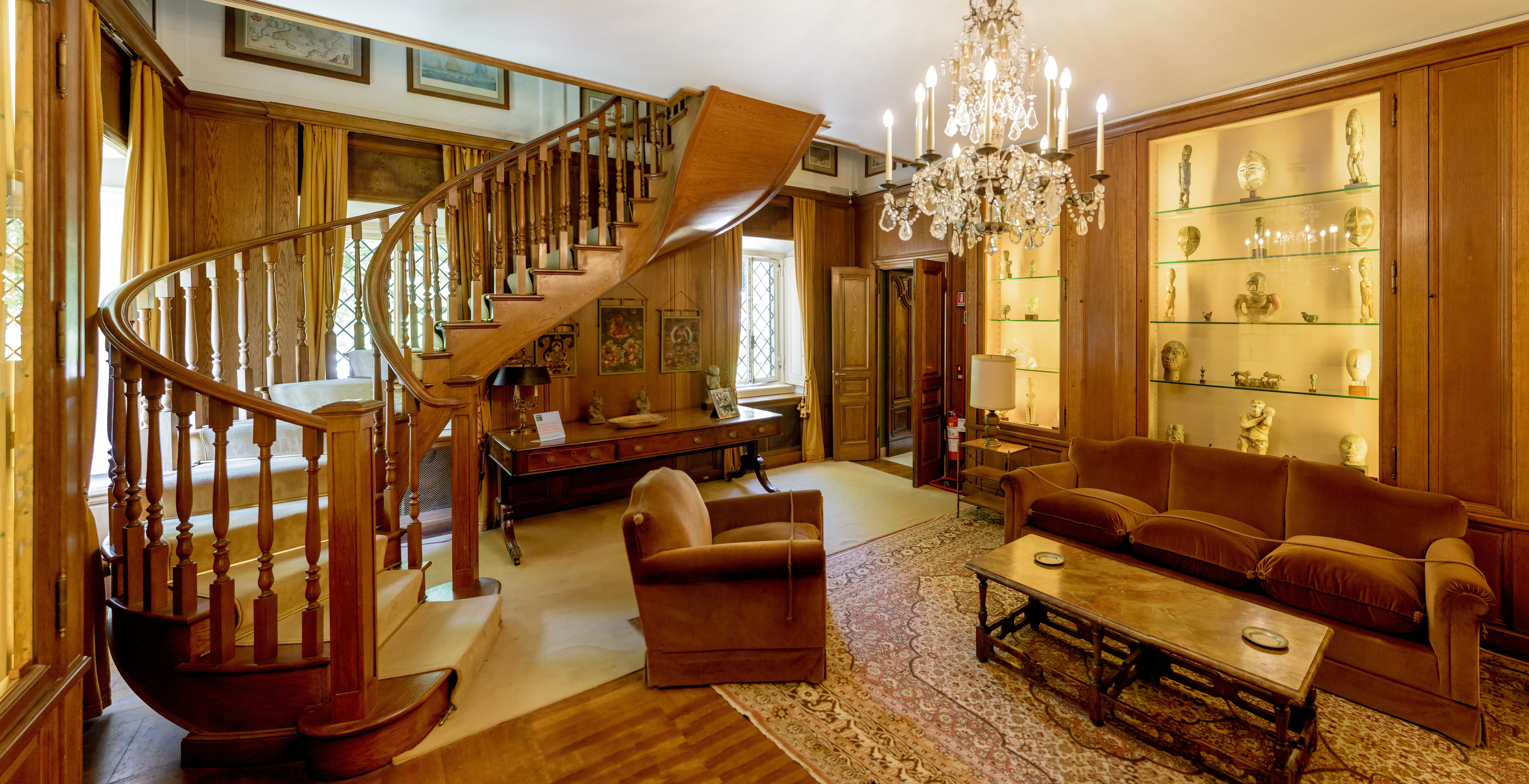
Exhibition room

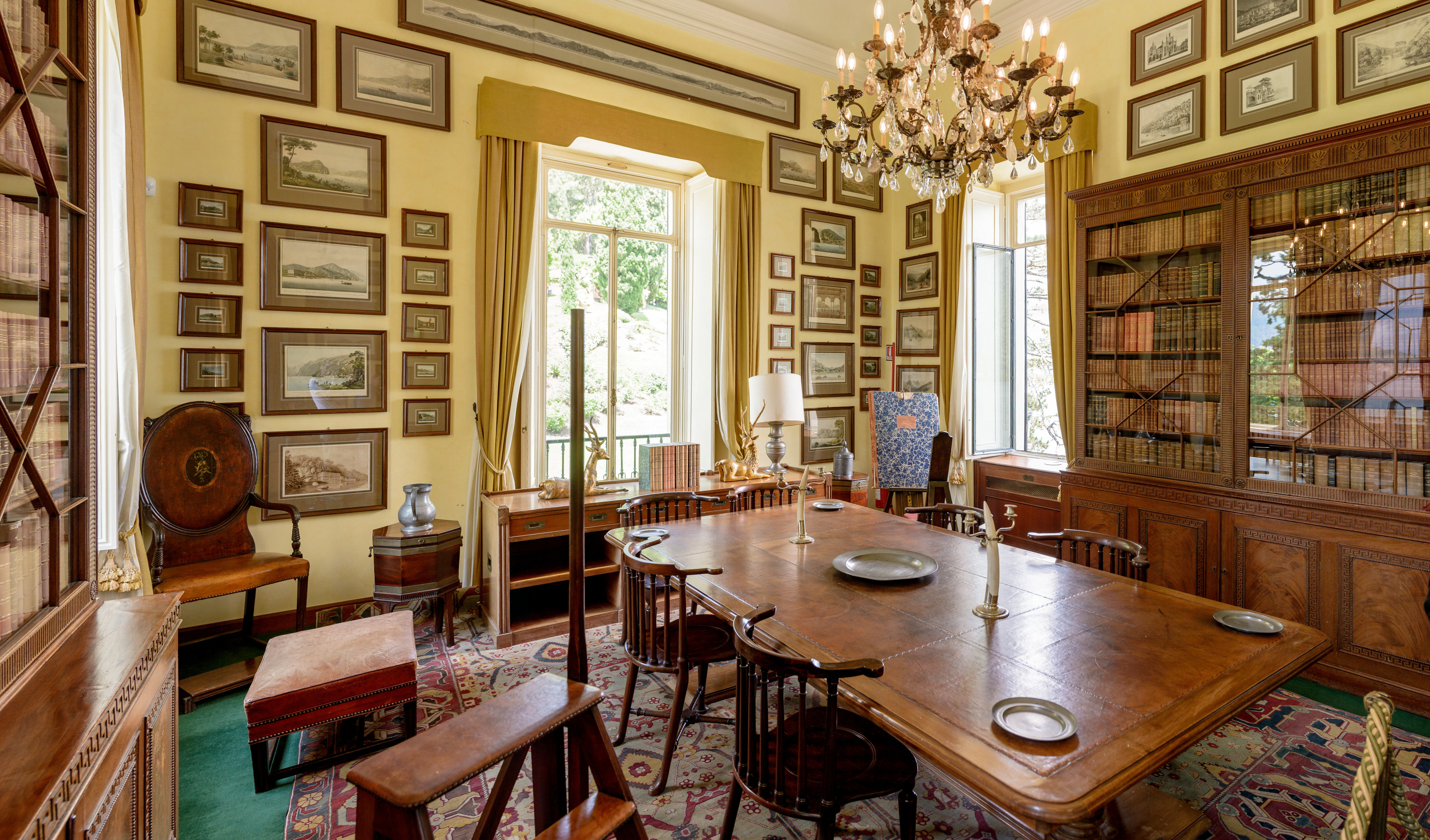
Map room

== See also ==
- Villa Bernasconi
- Villa Carlotta
- Villa Erba
- Villa d'Este, Cernobbio
- Villa Melzi
- Villa Monastero
- Villa Olmo
- Villa Serbelloni
- Villa Vigoni
