= The Myst =

Studio album by Celtic Harp Orchestra
- Released: 2005
- Recorded: 2005
- Genre: Celtic, Folk, Fusion
- Length: 53:03
- Label: Ethnoworld

Celtic Harp Orchestra chronology
Got the Magic (2003)	The Myst (2005)	Tale of the Fourth (2008)

The Myst is a studio album recorded by Celtic Harp Orchestra, released by Ethnoworld in 2005. The CD has been released in a limited edition as well, which includes in the cardboard double-box, an empty disc, pre-printed with the original graphics, to allow fans to burn an extra copy of The Myst.

== Tracks ==
1. Miranda and the Tempest
2. Gwersu
3. The Myst
4. Wings of the Dragonfly
5. The Dance of Lugh
6. Just Coffee and one Egg
7. Lover's Ghost
8. Myrdhyn's Last Spell
9. Evidence of Beauty
10. Not This, Not Yet
11. Bouncing Bach to You
12. A Bigger Dream
13. Keltango

== Musicians ==
Fabius Constable : Director, Cello, Harp, Piano, Accordion, Vocal in "A Bigger Dream".

Donatella Bortone: Soprano

Sabrina Noseda: Harp, Coro
Chiara Vincenzi: Harp
Danilo Marzorati: Harp
Pauline Fazzioli: Harp
Federica Maestri: Harp, Choir
Ludwig Constable: Harp
Antonella d'Apote : Harp
Teodora Cianferoni: Harp
Rossana Monico: Harp
Maria Assunta Romeo: Harp
Adriano Sangineto: Harp
Caterina Sangineto: Harp
Alaits Andonegi: Harp
Azzurra Giudici: Harp
Elena Sambin: Harp
Gabriella Villa: Harp
Antonio Callea: Harp, Flute
Nicolò Righi: Harp

Tommaso Latis: Violin
Camilla Uboldi: Violin, Mandolin

Massimo Cerra: Oboe

Andrea Scuffi: Bass guitar, Double bass

Giuseppe Festa: Lakota flute

Stefano Basurto: Sitar

Domenico Isolda: Percussion, Tubular bells
Valerio Meletti: Percussion

Giuseppe Vitali: Mix in Keltango

Marco Carenzio: Guitar, Choir, Vocal in "Lover's Ghost"
