= Andrea Appiani =

Italian painter (1754–1817)

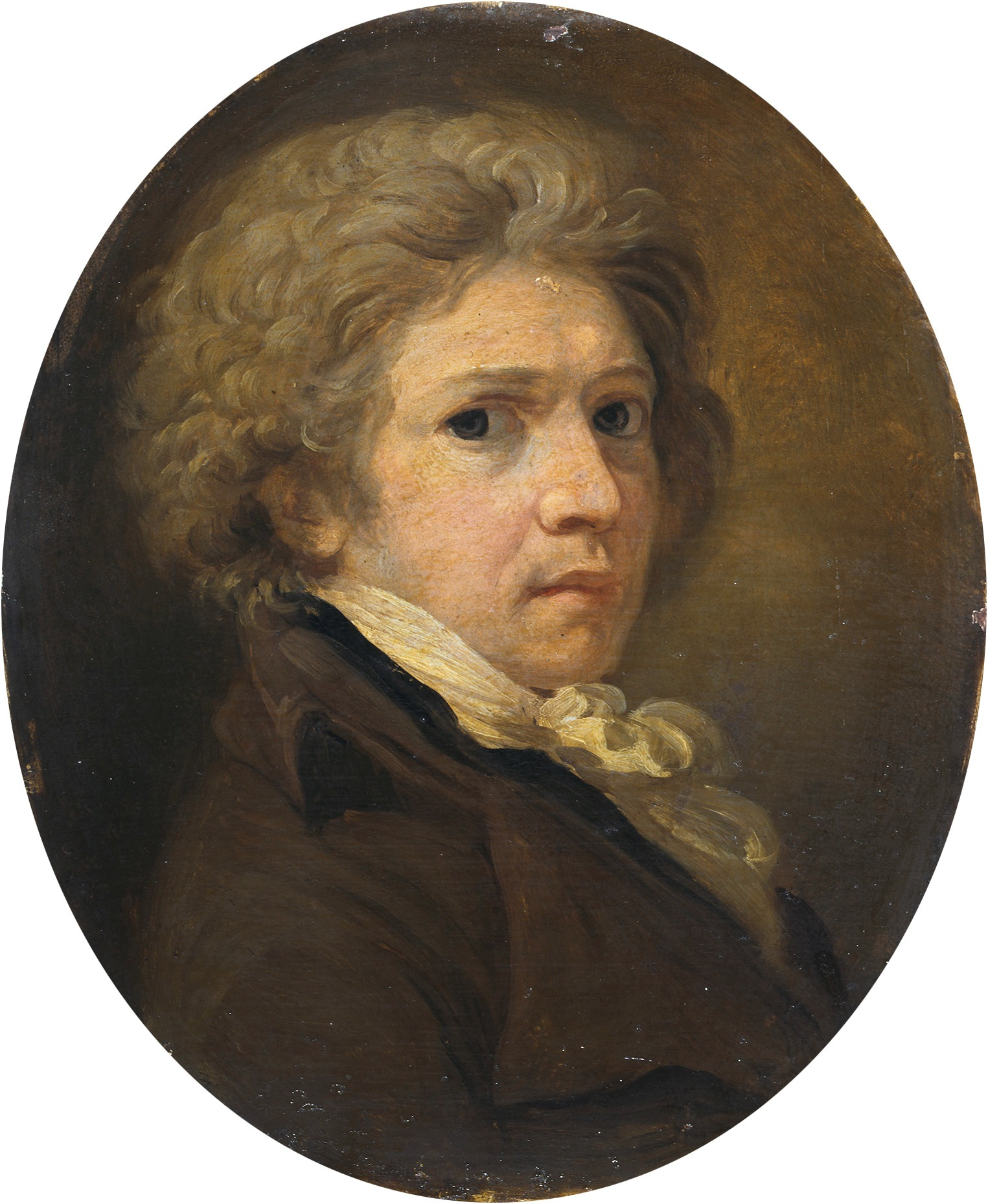
- Self-portrait, 1790s
- Born: 31 May 1754; Milan, Duchy of Milan
- Died: 8 November 1817 (aged 63); Milan, Lombardy–Venetia, Austrian Empire
- Education: Carlo Maria Giudici
- Known for: Painting
- Movement: Neoclassicism

Signature
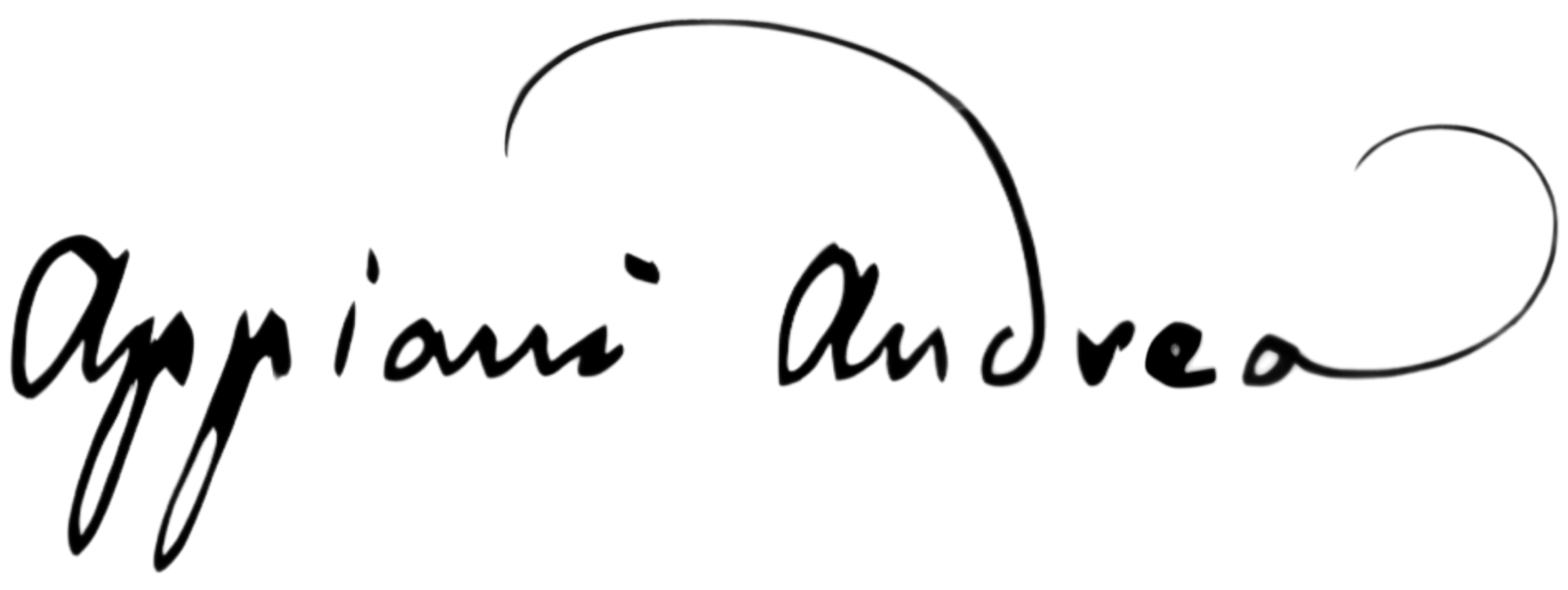

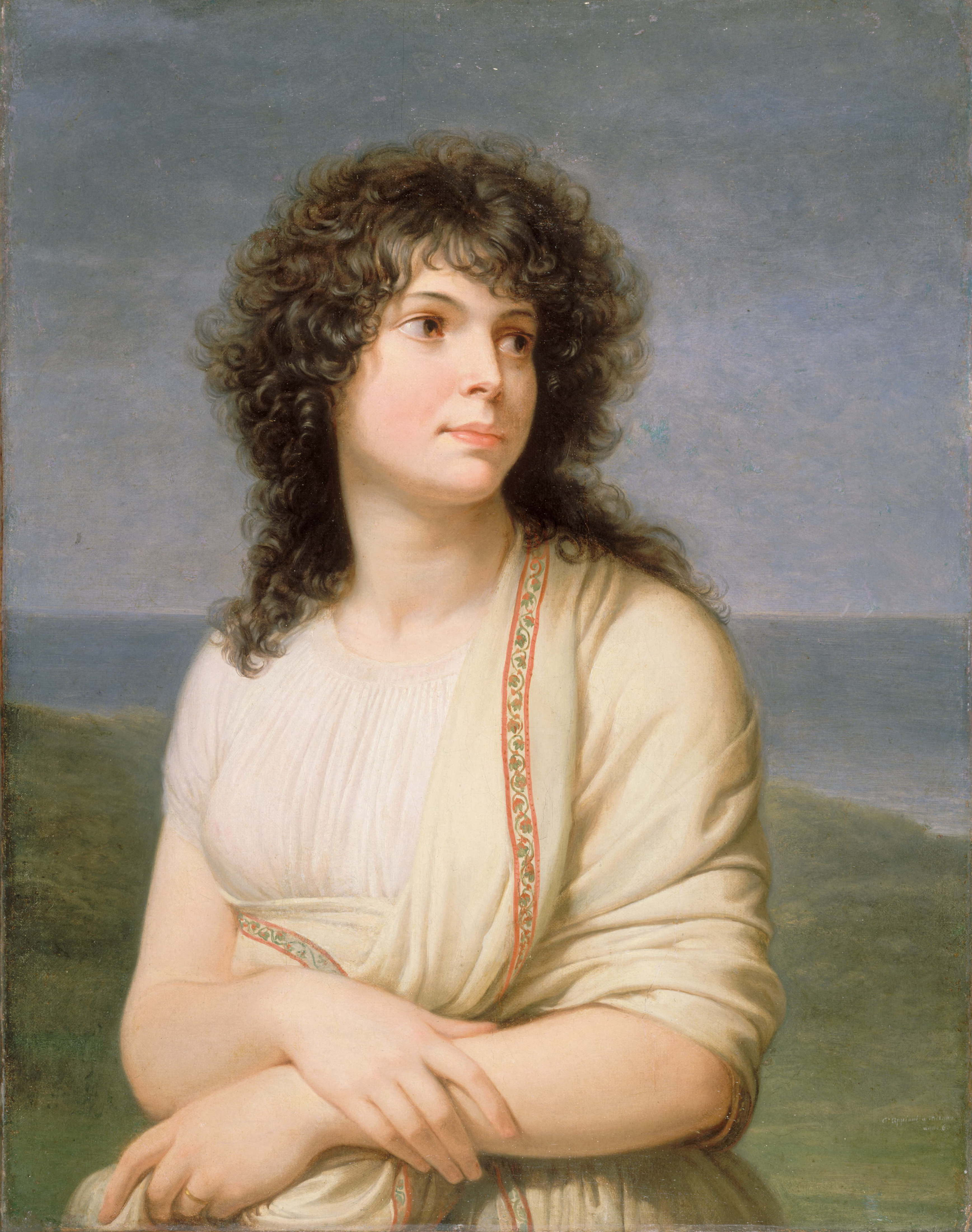
Portrait of Madame Hamelin (1798)

Andrea Appiani (31 May 1754 – 8 November 1817) was an Italian neoclassical painter. He is known as "the elder", to distinguish him from his great-nephew Andrea Appiani, a historical painter in Rome.

== Life ==
=== Early life and education ===
Born in Milan, it had been intended that he follow his father's career in medicine but instead entered the private academy of the painter Carlo Maria Giudici (1723–1804) where he received instruction in drawing, copying mainly from sculpture and prints. From there, he then joined the class of the fresco painter Antonio de' Giorgi, which was held at the Ambrosiana picture gallery in Milan. At the same time, he also frequented the studio of Martin Knoller, where his knowledge of painting in oils was deepened. Also, he studied anatomy at the Ospedale Maggiore in Milan with the sculptor Gaetano Monti.

Appiani's interest in aesthetic issues was stimulated by the classical poet Giuseppe Parini, whom he drew in two fine pencil portraits. In 1776, he entered the Brera Academy of Fine Arts to follow the painting courses of Giulio Traballesi, receiving a mastery of the fresco technique. Appiani made his début with the fresco dedicated to Saints Gervasio and Protasio, executed in 1776–7 for the church at Caglio. In 1782, he painted the altarpiece of the Nativity for the collegiate church of Santa Maria Nascente at Arona. Between 1783 and 1784, he worked successfully in Florence as a stage designer. Dating from 1786 is the architectural project (completed in 1798) for the high altar of Duomo of Monza, which was followed by frescoes with mythological subjects for the Palazzo Busca Arconati, Milan. In 1788, he painted the portrait of Alessandro Litta Arese and carried out the decorations, in collaboration with Traballesi, for the Palazzo Orsini Falcò, Milan. In 1788, he had also begun for the Congregazione degli Osti, Milan, the great Supper at Emmaus, which was finished only in 1796.

=== First major works ===
In 1789, Appiani produced his first masterpiece, the cycle of frescoes depicting the Story of Psyche in the Rotonda of the Royal Villa of Monza, commissioned by the Habsburg Archduke Ferdinand and influenced by Raphael’s decorations in the Villa Farnesina, Rome. From the study of antique lamps and cameos, he derived the inspiration for Venus and Cupid (1789–90), painted for Giovanni Battista Sommariva. During this period, Appiani was also active as a designer of fashionable Neo-classical furniture. In 1791, he made a nine-month journey to study in Bologna, Florence, Rome and especially in Parma, where he studied the frescoes of Correggio. On his return to Milan, he was entirely occupied between 1791 and 1795 on the frescoes for the cupola and pendentives of the church of Santa Maria presso San Celso, which are considered his masterpieces (many of the drawings and preparatory cartoons are kept in Milan, Brera and Sforza Castle). In 1795 he was a guest at the Palazzo Moriggia in Balsamo, where he executed frescoes on mythological subjects, of which the surviving portions are preserved in the Villa Ghirlanda at Cinisello.

=== Napoleonic period ===
In 1796, on the entry of Napoleon into Milan, Appiani made a splendid pencil portrait of him (Milan, Brera), which won him the favour of the General and numerous commissions within the Cisalpine Republic. He designed many medals and the headings for official papers, and was put in charge of choosing the works of art to be requisitioned and transferred to France. In 1798, he produced the fresco for the salone of the Palazzo Castiglioni in Milan, adorned with putti and mythological scenes, and a painted drop-curtain for the Teatro Patriottico, Milan, which represents Virtue Putting Vice to Flight. In 1799–1800, he completed the cycle of frescoes with the Myths of Apollo at the Casa Sannazzaro, Milan, later the Casa Prina (Milan, Brera; Milan, Gal. A. Mod.), and executed a beautiful posthumous portrait of Louis Desaix (Versailles, Château). Appiani was sent to the Consulte de Lyon in 1801, and he also travelled to Paris, where he made numerous portraits of members of the Bonaparte family.

Returning to Milan the same year, he frescoed two ceilings in the palazzi Litta and Passalacqua with a depiction of Aurora, inspired by Guido Reni. In 1802, having been nominated Commissario Generale delle Belle Arti, Appiani drew attention to the need to restore Leonardo’s Last Supper; from 1803 he worked with Giuseppe Bossi on the preparation of the Pinacoteca di Brera. Also in 1803, he painted the celebrated portraits of Napoleon and of Francesco Melzi (both Bellagio, Villa Melzi-d’Eril). The same year he began work on the Fasti di Napoleone, a series of 35 monochrome canvases for the Sala delle Cariatidi in the Royal Palace of Milan, which were completed in 1807 (destr.; engraved under the supervision of Appiani himself and the direction of Giuseppe Longhi).

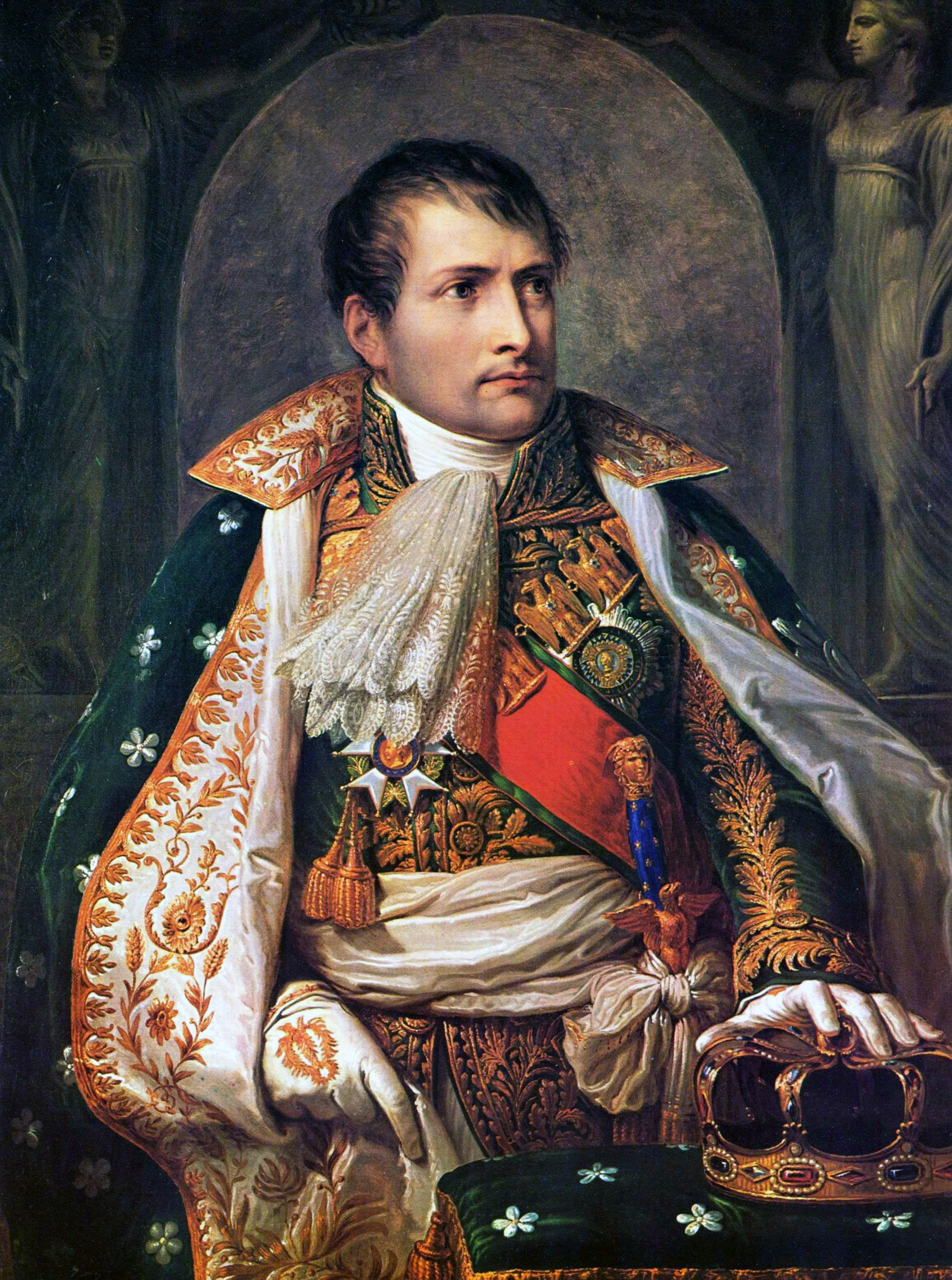
Portrait of Napoleon (1805)

In 1804, Appiani went to Paris for the coronation of Napoleon and met Jacques-Louis David. In 1805, he painted the portrait of Napoleon, King of Italy (Vienna, Ksthist. Mus.), and the same year he completed the canvas of the Meeting of Jacob and Rachel, which he had begun in 1795 (Alzano Lombardo, Basilica of San Martino). His activity as a decorator at the Palazzo Reale in Milan was notable; he painted frescoes for a series of staterooms (destr. 1943). The only ones to survive (Tremezzo, Villa Carlotta) are those for the Sala del Trono, completed in 1808: the Apotheosis of the Emperor Napoleon on the vault and four lunettes representing Justice, Prudence, Fortitude and Temperance. In the Sala delle Udienze Solenni he represented Minerva Showing the Shield of History to Clio on the vault and the Four Continents in the lunettes (1809), and in the Sala della Rotonda he painted Peace and Hymen (1810) to commemorate the wedding of Napoleon with Maria Luisa. Appiani died before completing the decorations of the Sala della Lanterna, where he had completed two frescoes with the Continence of Scipio and Mucius Scaevola and where he had planned the Death of Lucretia, the Pacification between the Romans and the Sabines, as well as Veturia and Coriolanus (preparatory drawings Milan, Sforza Castle). Among his pupils are Carlo Prajer, Angelo Monticelli, and Giuseppe Bossi.

=== Legacy ===
Appiani, who was perhaps the chief exponent of Italian Neoclassical painting, was valued for his impeccable technique and for his superb handling, whether in drawings, oil paintings or frescoes. His distinctive style, which was based chiefly on gentle chiaroscuro passages and on a delicate gradation of tone inspired by Correggio and by the school of Leonardo, differs from the severe and statuesque manner of David and resembles more closely that of Pierre-Paul Prud'hon. His paintings, particularly his frescos, were preceded by numerous preparatory drawings carried out in pencil or charcoal. The effects of extreme softness and luminosity that characterise his drawings are also found in the paintings, which appear to have been executed with an extraordinary facility and grace. In particular, in the portraits, where he was able to overcome the formal conventions of his time, he eliminated over-attention to the surroundings through a refined feeling for colour and atmosphere. He was able to achieve similar results in his grand decorations in fresco, where the iconographic allusions to Classical antiquity or the requirements of political allegory are resolved in compositions that are lively and refined.

== Gallery ==
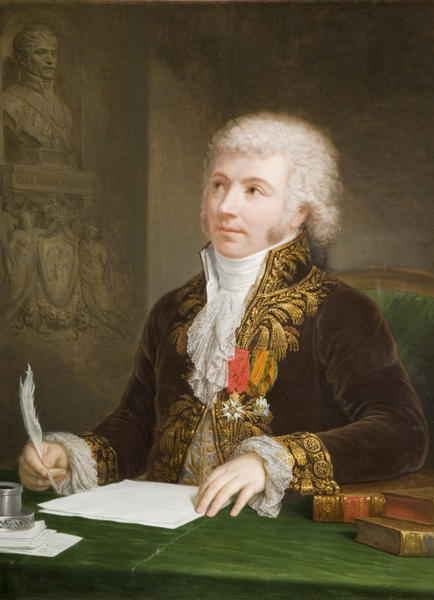
Étienne Mejan

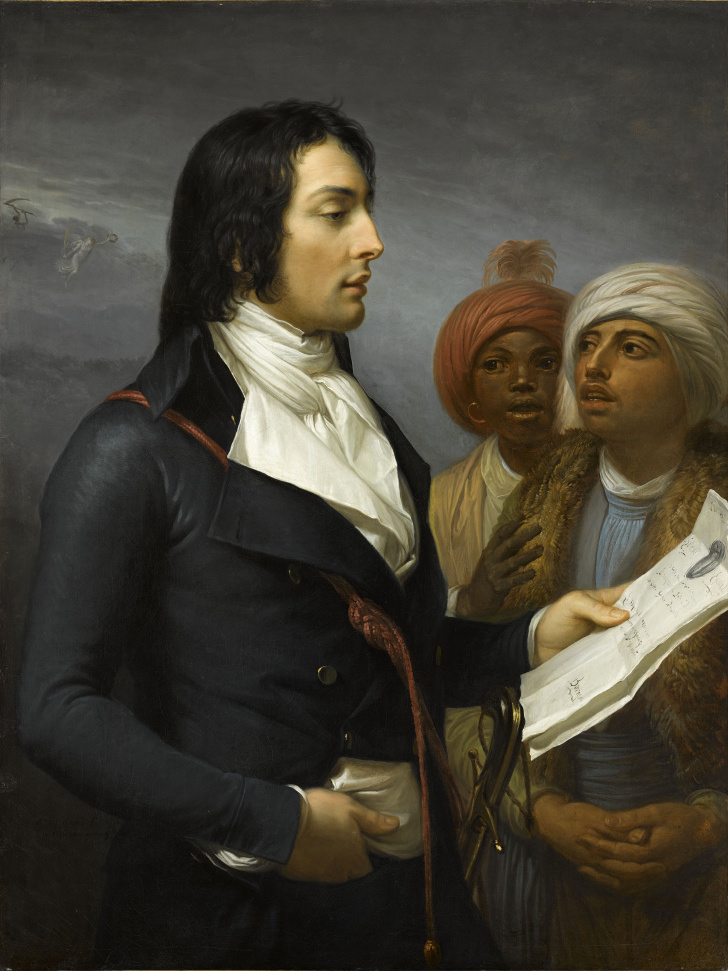
Louis Desaix
(1800)

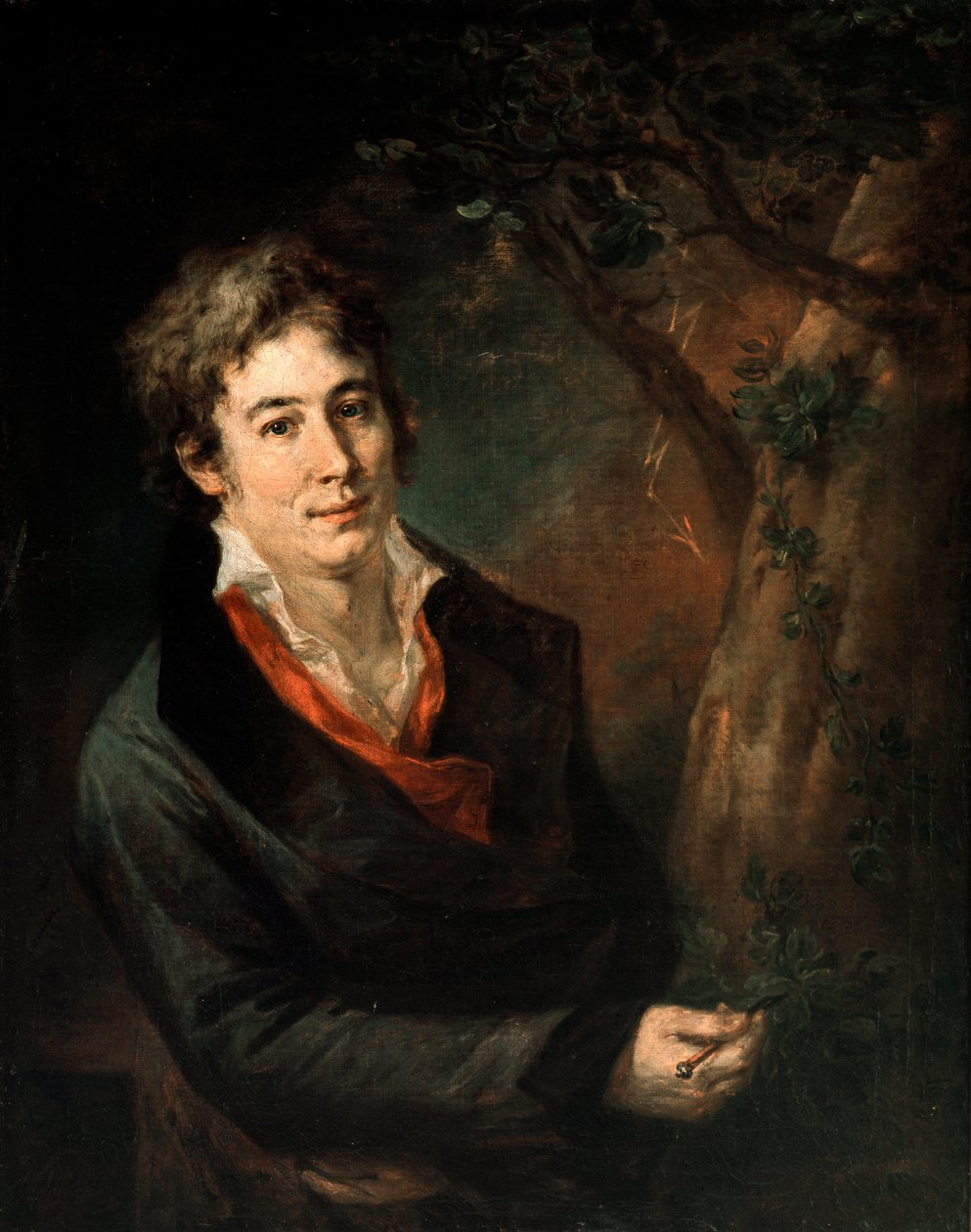
Ugo Foscolo

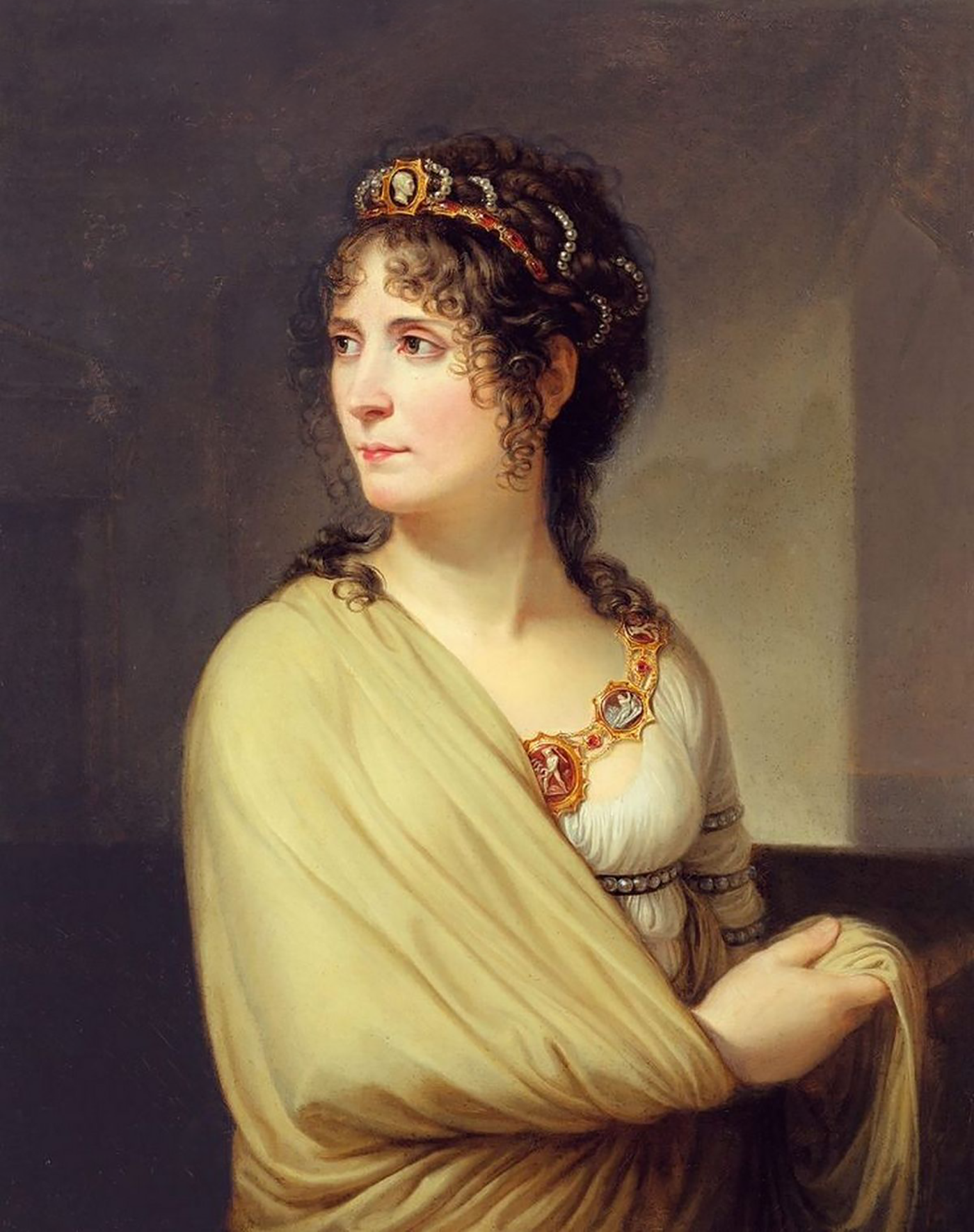
Josephine

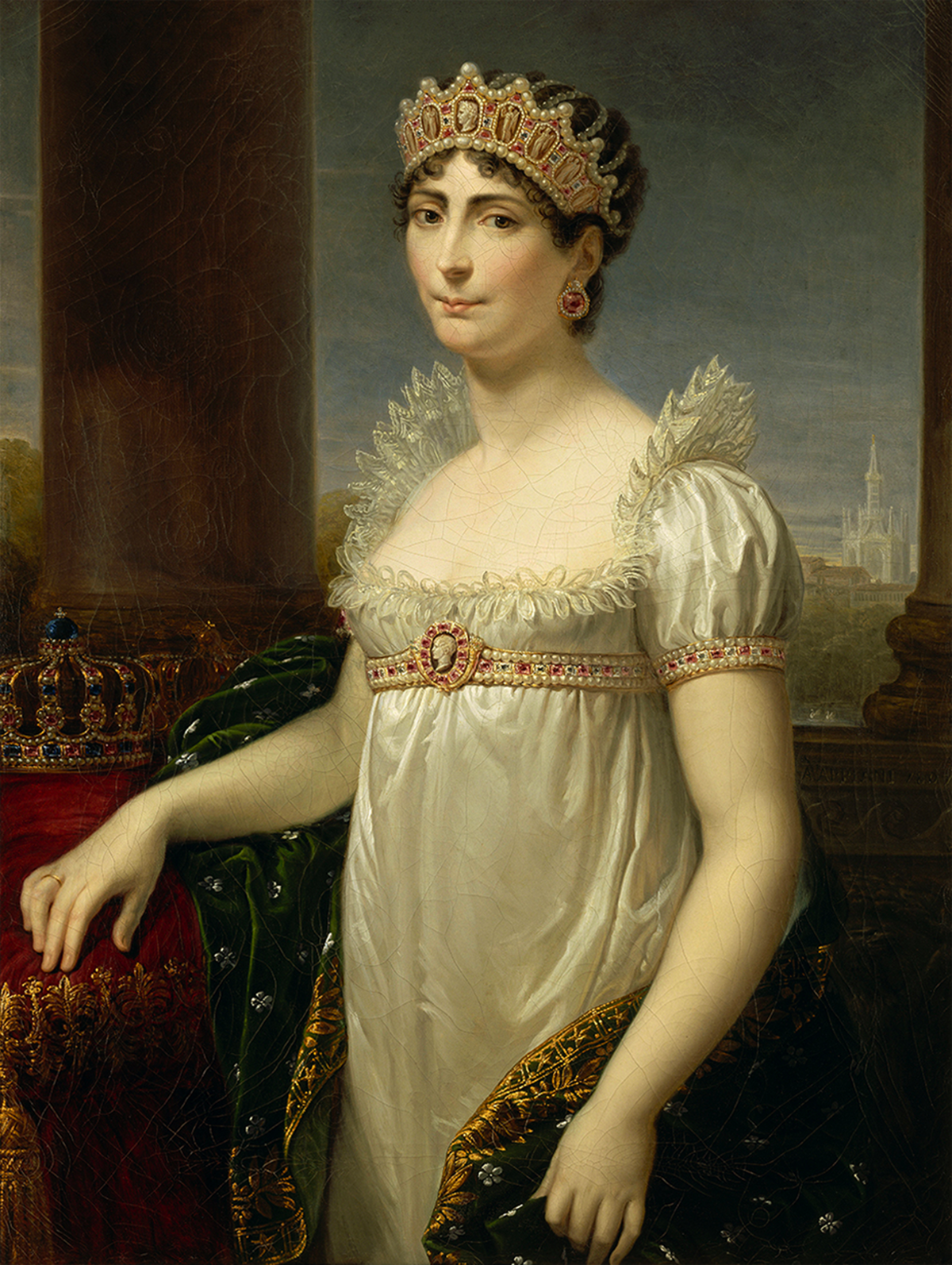
Josephine, Queen of Italy

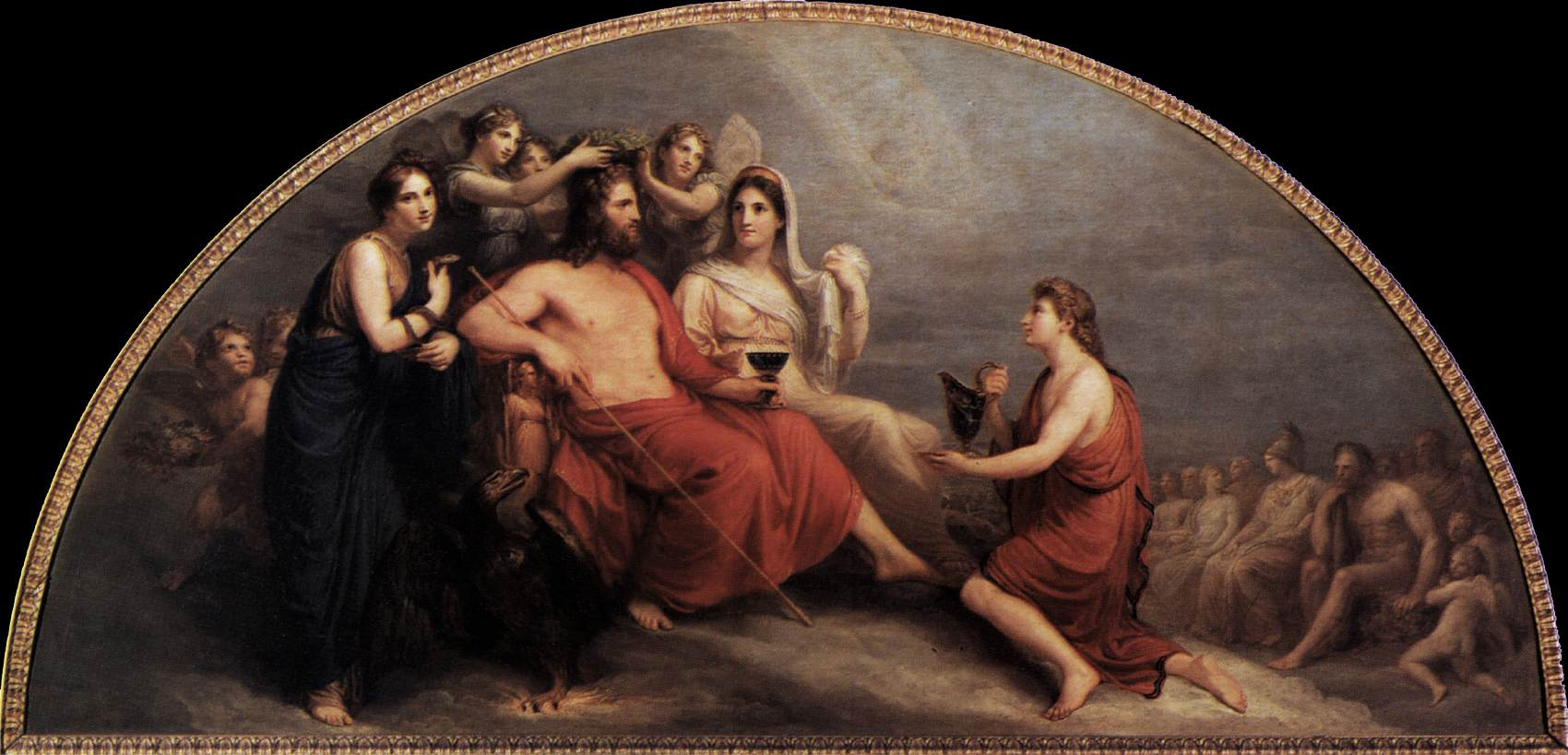
The Olympus

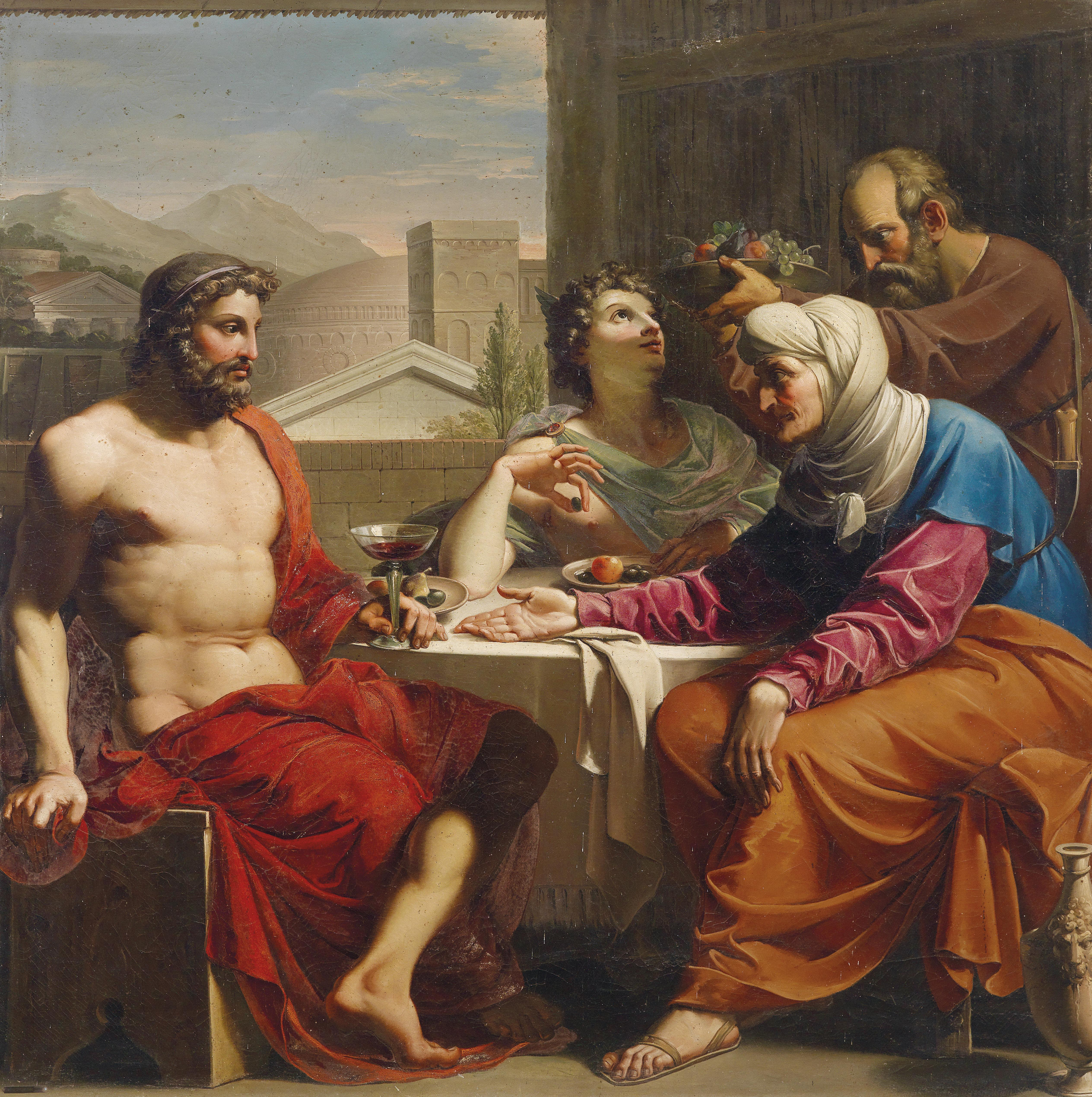
Jupiter, Mercury, Philemon, and Baucis

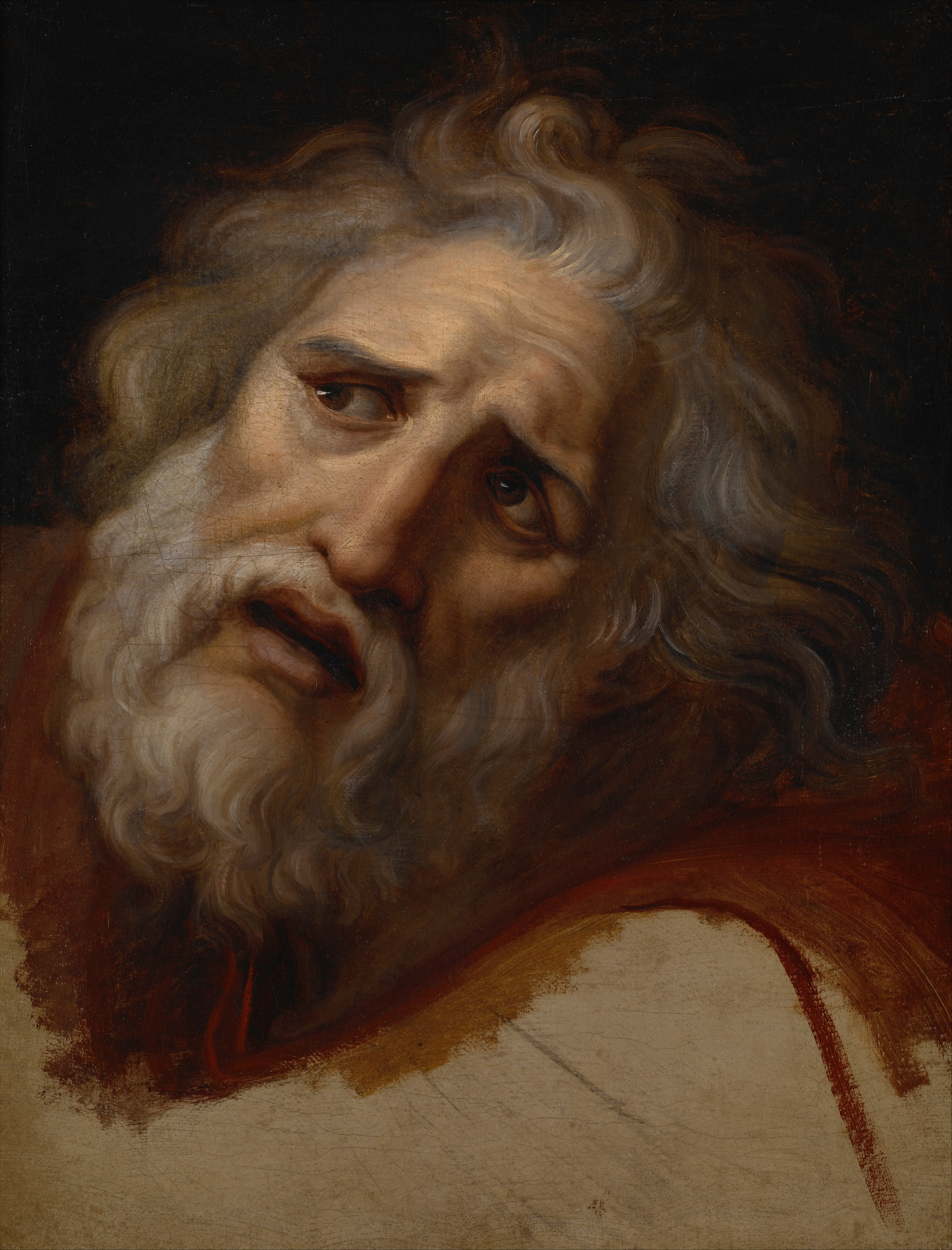
Head of Laocoön, about 1790

Eugène Beauharnais, portrait by Appiani, 1800.

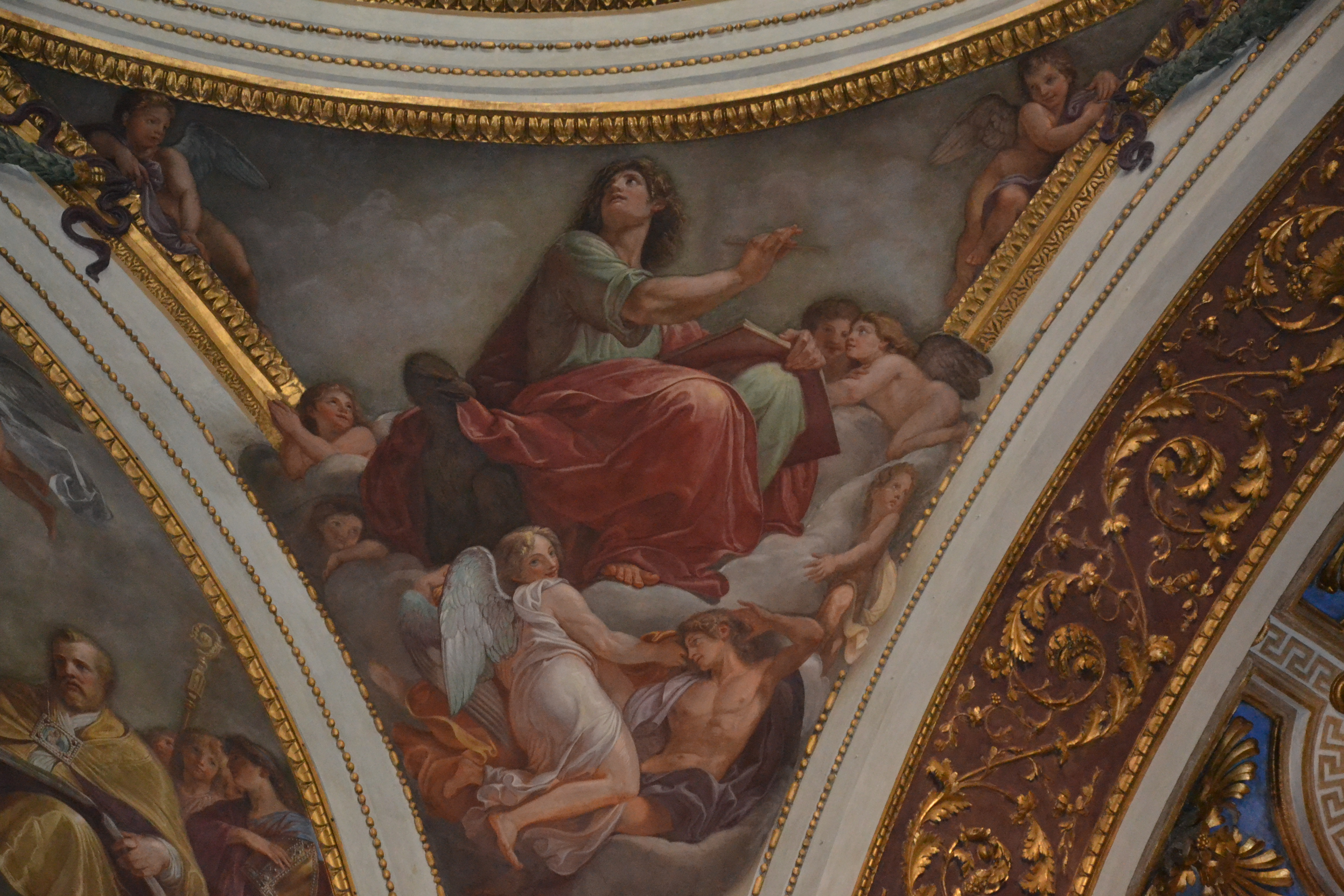
The Evangelists, detail

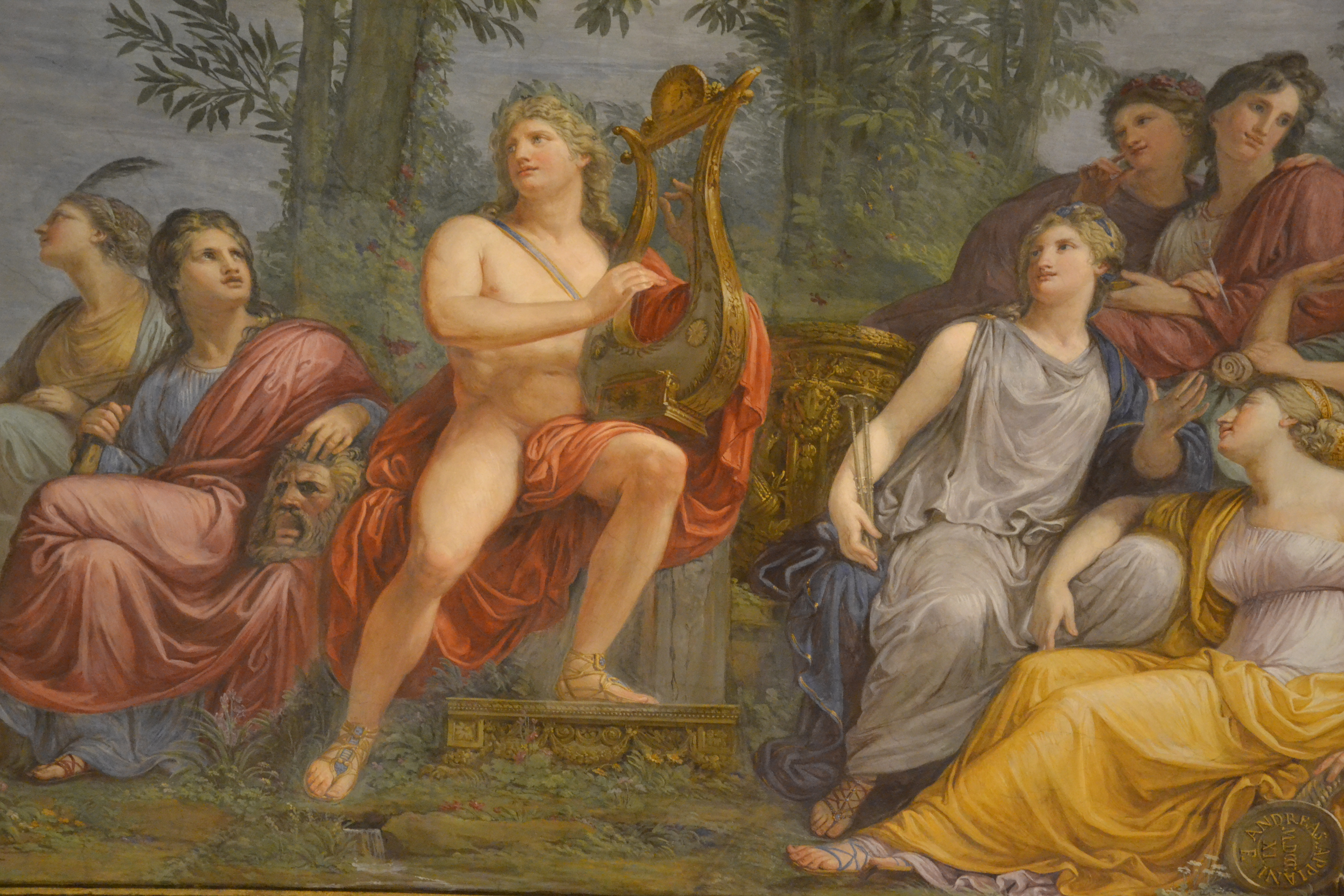
The Parnassus, detail

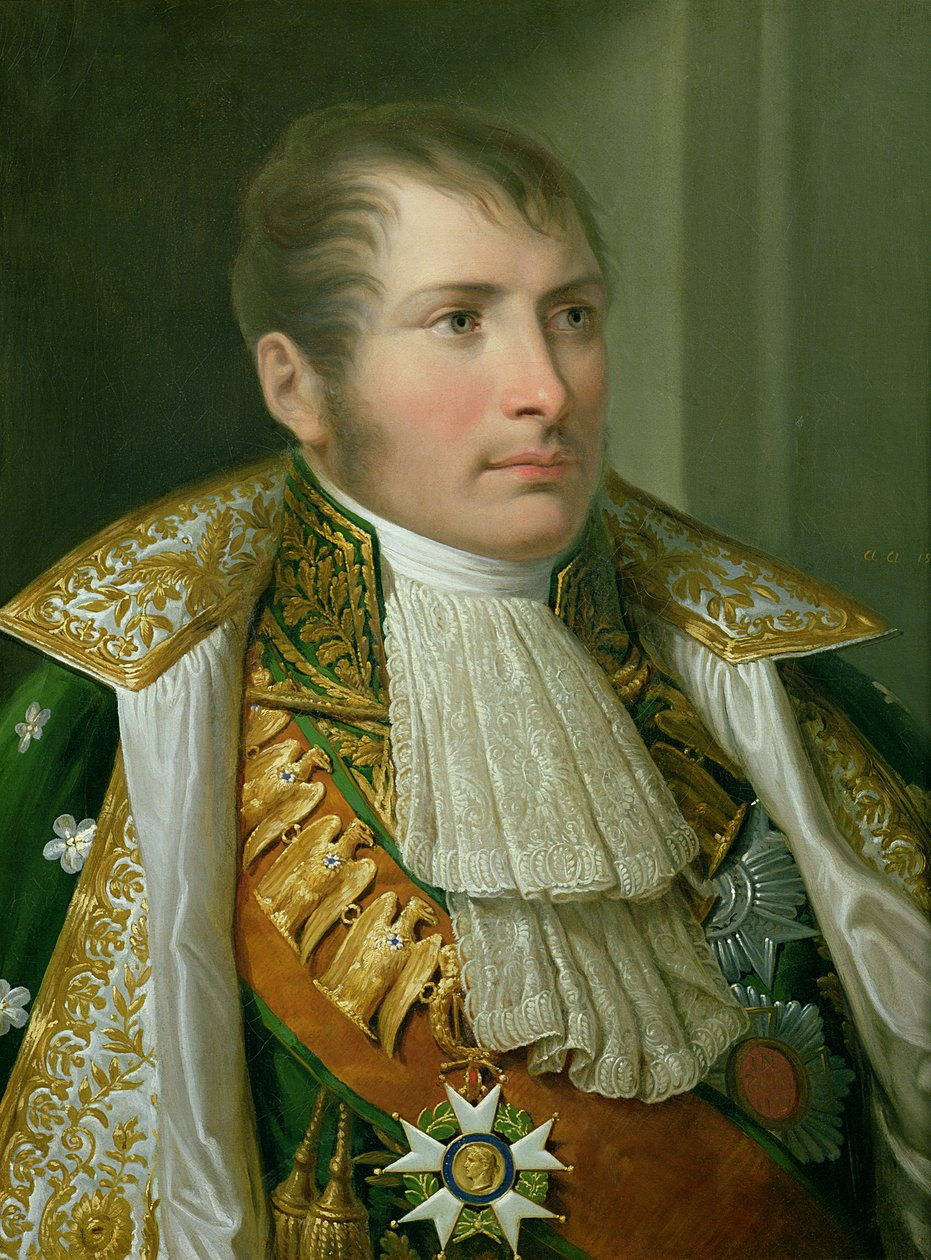
Eugene de Beauharnais (1810)
