= Giovan Battista Caniana =

Italian sculptor and architect

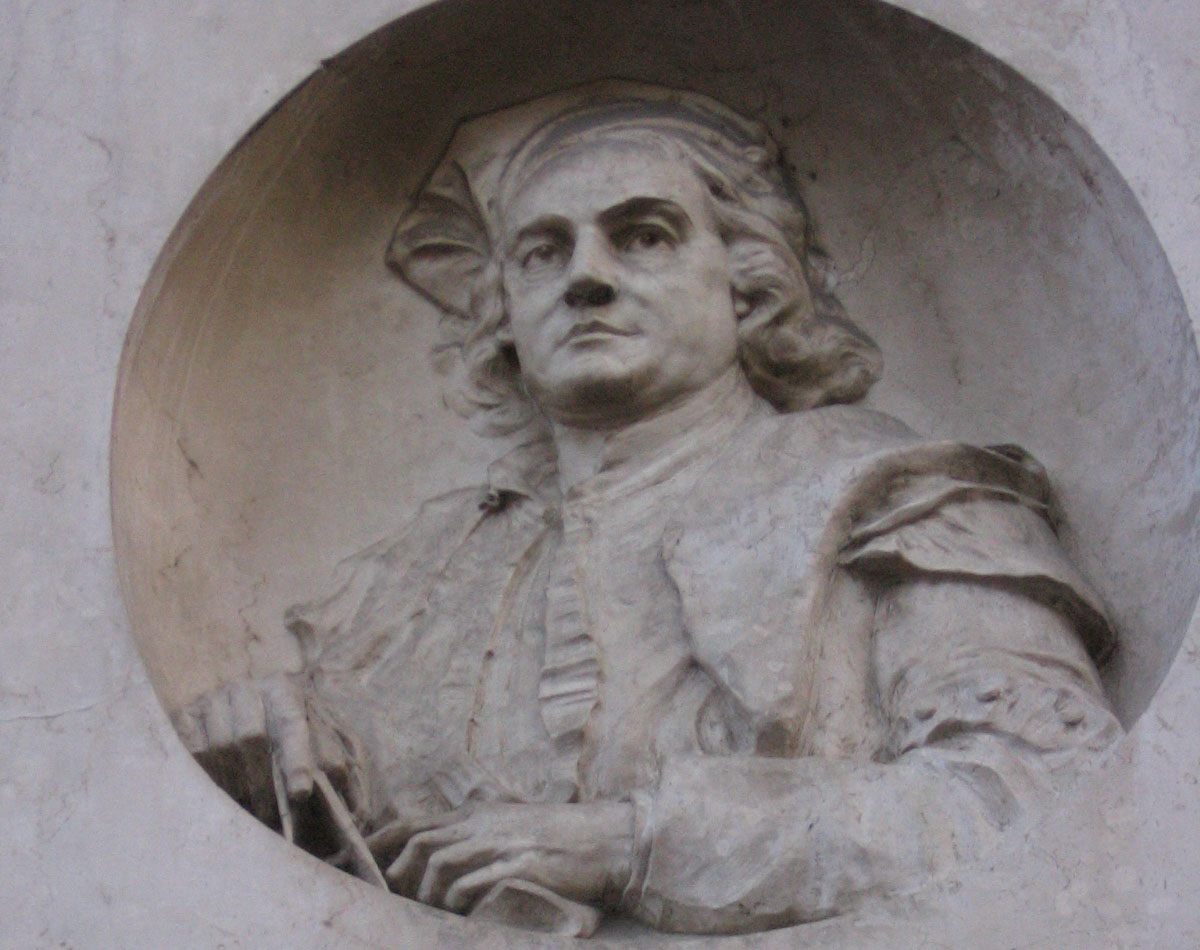
Marble relief of Giovan Battista Caniana, outside the Basilica of San Martino, Alzano Lombardo

Giovan Battista Caniana (8 May 1671 – 5 May 1754) was an Italian sculptor and architect.

== Biography ==
Caniana was born in Romano di Lombardia, and his father, Giacomo Antonio, also a sculptor, died when he was 8 years old. His mother, Datila, sent him to study at Longhena, where he trained under Andrea Brustolon. A few years later, Caniana returned to his family, where he worked in a shop with his brothers. In 1694, after he married Bridget Grass, he turned to architecture and worked on a number of local projects. He died in Alzano Lombardo, aged 82.

His grandson, Giacomo Caniana, was also an architect.
