= Carlo Prajer =

Italian painter

Carlo Prajer or Carlo Prayer (Active 1789-1832) was a late 18th- and early 19th-century painter and engraver. He was born in Milan, and active in Lombardy. A pupil of Andrea Appiani, he became director of the Accademia Carrara in Bergamo. He painted four canvases designed by Giuseppe Bossi depicting the Life of Leonardo for the Villa Melzi d'Eril in Bellagio.
