= D'Agincourt =

d'Agincourt is a surname. Notable people with the surname include:

- François d'Agincourt (1684–1758), French harpsichordist, organist, and composer
- Jean Baptiste Seroux d'Agincourt (1730–1814), French archaeologist and historian
