= Pietro Labruzzi =

Italian painter (1739–1805)

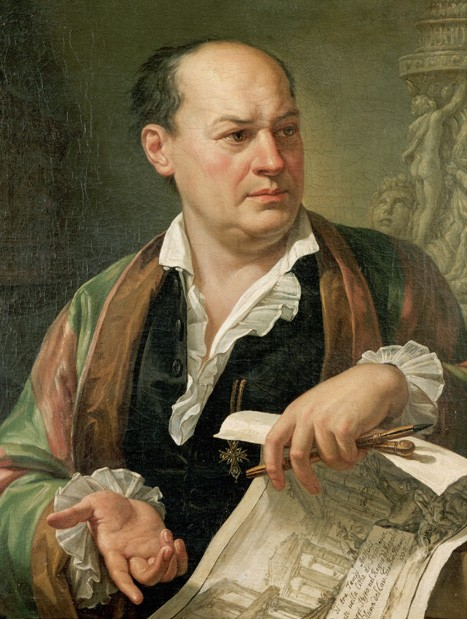
Pietro Labruzzi portrait of Giovanni Battista Piranesi

Pietro Labruzzi (1739–1805) was an Italian painter of the Neoclassical period, active in Rome and Poland. He is best known for his altarpieces and portraits.

He was born and died in Rome. Pietro was recruited as a painter for the court of Stanislaus Augustus, King of Poland. Among his works is an altarpiece of the Chapel of the Madonna for the church of Gesù e Maria in Rome.

His younger brother Carlo Labruzzi was a respected landscape painter in Rome. His son, Tommasso Pietro Labruzzi, was a history painter in Rome, died in 1808. One of his pupils was William Thomas Hadfield.
