= Giuseppe Bossi =

Italian painter (1777–1815)

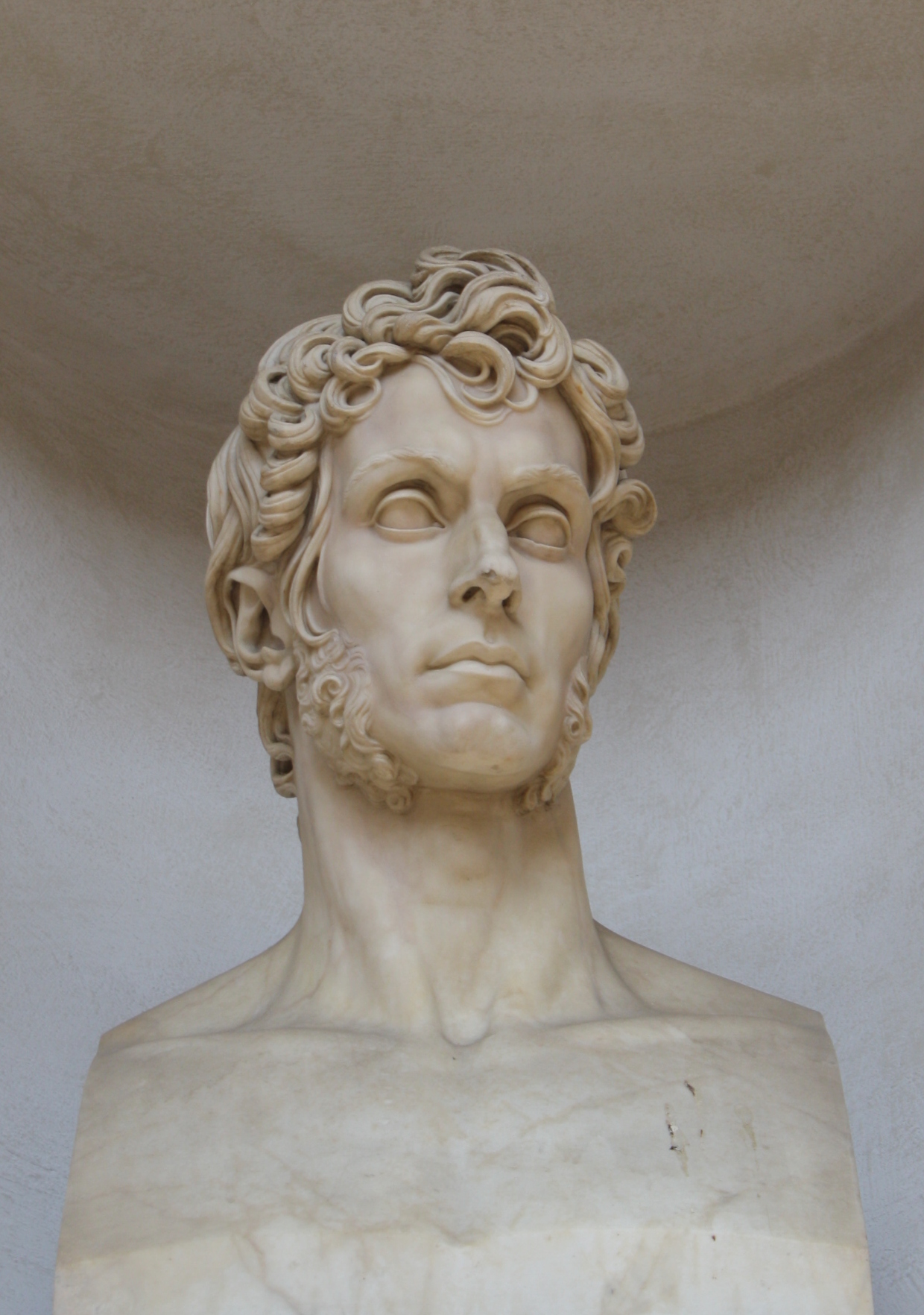
- Giuseppe Bossi, bust by Camillo Pacetti
- Born: 11 August 1777; Busto Arsizio, Duchy of Milan
- Died: 9 November 1815 (aged 38); Milan, Kingdom of Lombardy–Venetia
- Known for: Historical and religious painting
- Movement: Neoclassicism

Giuseppe Bossi (11 August 1777 – 9 November 1815) was an Italian painter, arts administrator and writer on art. He ranks among the foremost figures of Neoclassical culture in Lombardy, along with Ugo Foscolo, Giuseppe Parini, Andrea Appiani or Manzoni.

== Biography ==
=== Early life and education ===
Giuseppe Bossi was born in the town of Busto Arsizio, near Milan. He was educated at the college of Monza; and his early fondness for drawing was fostered by the director of the college. He then studied at the Brera Academy of Fine Arts at Milan, and spent the years 1795 to 1801 in Rome, where he drew Roman remains and honed his skills in drawing anatomy at the morgue of a hospital and formed an intimate friendship with Canova, who made a portrait bust of Bossi. In Rome, Bossi acquainted himself with such Neoclassical artists as Angelica Kauffman and Marianna Candidi Dionigi as well as writers, scholars and archaeologists, notably Jean Baptiste Seroux d'Agincourt, Giovanni Gherardo De Rossi and Ennio Quirino Visconti. He studied Antique and Renaissance works, making copies of the statues in the Museo Pio-Clementino and the frescoes by Raphael and Michelangelo in the Vatican, also furthering his studies of the nude in the Accademia of Domenico Conti Bazzani and making anatomical drawings of corpses in the Ospedale di Santa Maria della Consolazione.

=== The Napoleonic period ===
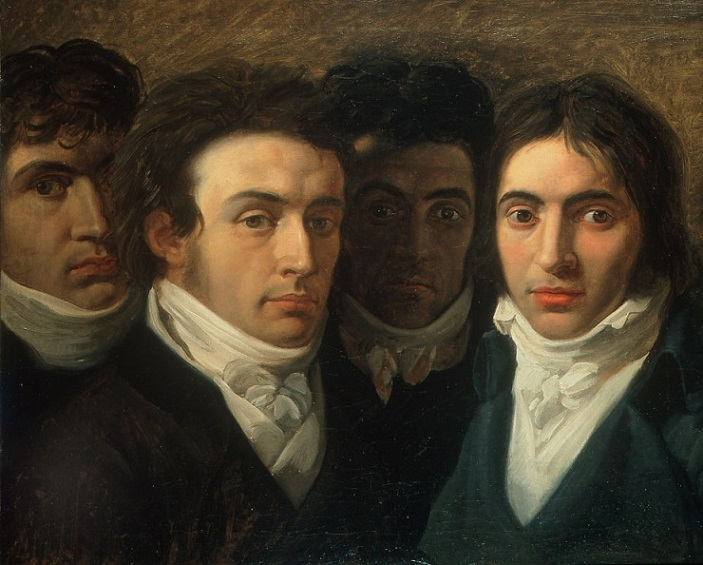
Giuseppe Bossi, Self portrait with Gaetano Cattaneo, Carlo Porta and Giuseppe Taverna, oil on canvas, Pinacoteca di Brera, Milan

On his return to Milan he fell in with the circle of progressive young artists gathered around the poet Carlo Porta, the Cameretta Portiana. He became assistant secretary, and then secretary (1802–1807) of the Brera Academy, whose collection of paintings, the Pinacoteca di Brera he essentially founded. He prevented numerous works from being smuggled abroad or dispersed and was responsible for their inclusion in the Pinacoteca. Among his most famous acquisitions were Raphael’s Marriage of the Virgin (1504) and the Virgin and Child by Giovanni Bellini. In 1802 Bossi traveled to Lyon to take part in the Consulte de Lyon about the future of Italy. In France he met such painters as Jacques-Louis David, Anne-Louis Girodet and François Gérard. This led to a socio-political slant in his painting, as in the Italian Republic’s Gratitude to Napoleon (1802; Milan, Pinacoteca di Brera). He later diluted his youthful academicism with a more poetic and sensual style, as in his mythological frescoes The Night and the Dawn (1805–6; Erba, Como, Villa Amalia), which presage the development of his taste for Romanticism.

In Milan Bossi met such intellectuals as Giuseppe Parini, Pietro Verri and Alessandro Manzoni and people from the art world including Felice Giani, Vincenzo Camuccini and Leopoldo Cicognara. In 1804, in conjunction with Barnaba Oriani, he drew up revised organizational rules for the three academies of art of Bologna, Venice and Milan, which lent weight to the need for public collections of great examples of the arts, which were being supplied from the dissolved monasteries and secularized churches of Lombardy, under Napoleonic administration. He was rewarded with the Order of the Iron Crown. On the occasion of the visit of Napoleon to Milan in 1805, Bossi exhibited at the Pinacoteca a drawing of the Last Judgment of Michelangelo, and paintings representing Aurora and Night, Oedipus and Creon, and the Italian Parnassus.

In 1807, by command of prince Eugène de Beauharnais, viceroy of Italy, Bossi undertook to make a copy of The Last Supper of Leonardo da Vinci, then almost obliterated, for the purpose of getting it rendered in mosaic. The drawing was made from the remains of the original with the aid of copies and the best prints. The mosaic, 9.18 m in length, was executed by the Roman mosaicist Giacomo Raffaelli, and was placed in the Minoritenkirche, Vienna. Bossi made another copy in oil, which was placed in the Pinacoteca Brera.

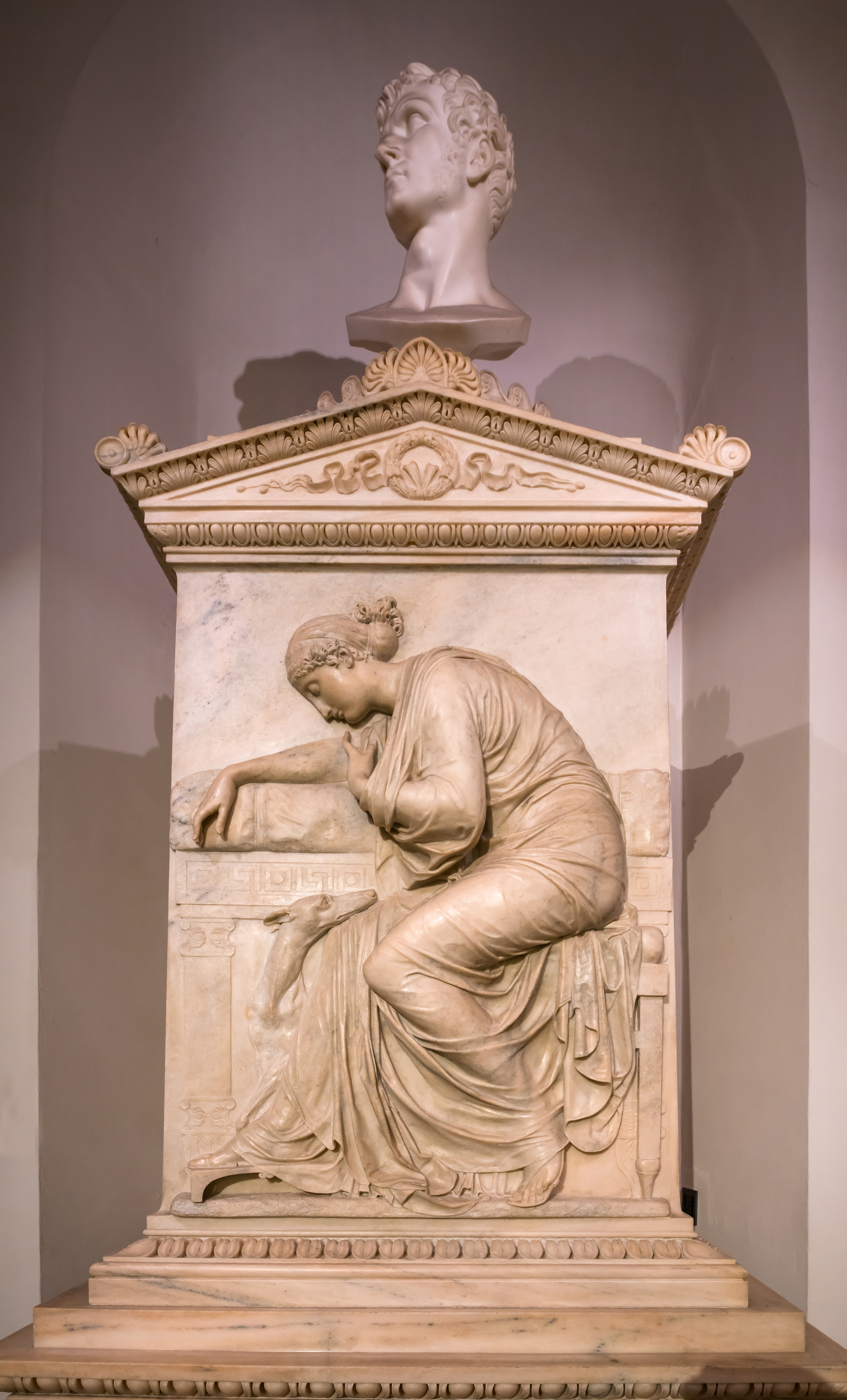
Monument for Giuseppe Bossi by Canova and Marchesi in Milan.

Bossi devoted a large part of his life to the study of the works of Leonardo, whose drawing manner he imitated accurately enough for his productions to have passed as Leonardo's. and his last work was a series of drawings in monochrome representing incidents in the life of that great master. He left unfinished a large cartoon in black chalk of the Dead Christ in the bosom of Mary, with John and the Magdalene. In 1810 he published a special work in large quarto, entitled Del Cenacolo di Leonardo da Vinci, which had the merit of greatly interesting Goethe, who shared Bossi's urgent dream of saving Leonardo's fresco.

Bossi's other publications were Delle Opinioni di Leonardo intorno alla simmetria de corpi umani (1811), and Del Tipo dell'arte della pittura (1816). His diary, 1807–1815, is a useful guide to the official artistic life of Napoleonic Milan. Bossi died at his home in via S. Maria Valle, Milan. A monument by Canova was erected to his memory in the Biblioteca Ambrosiana, and a bust was placed in the Accademia di Brera.

=== Art collection ===
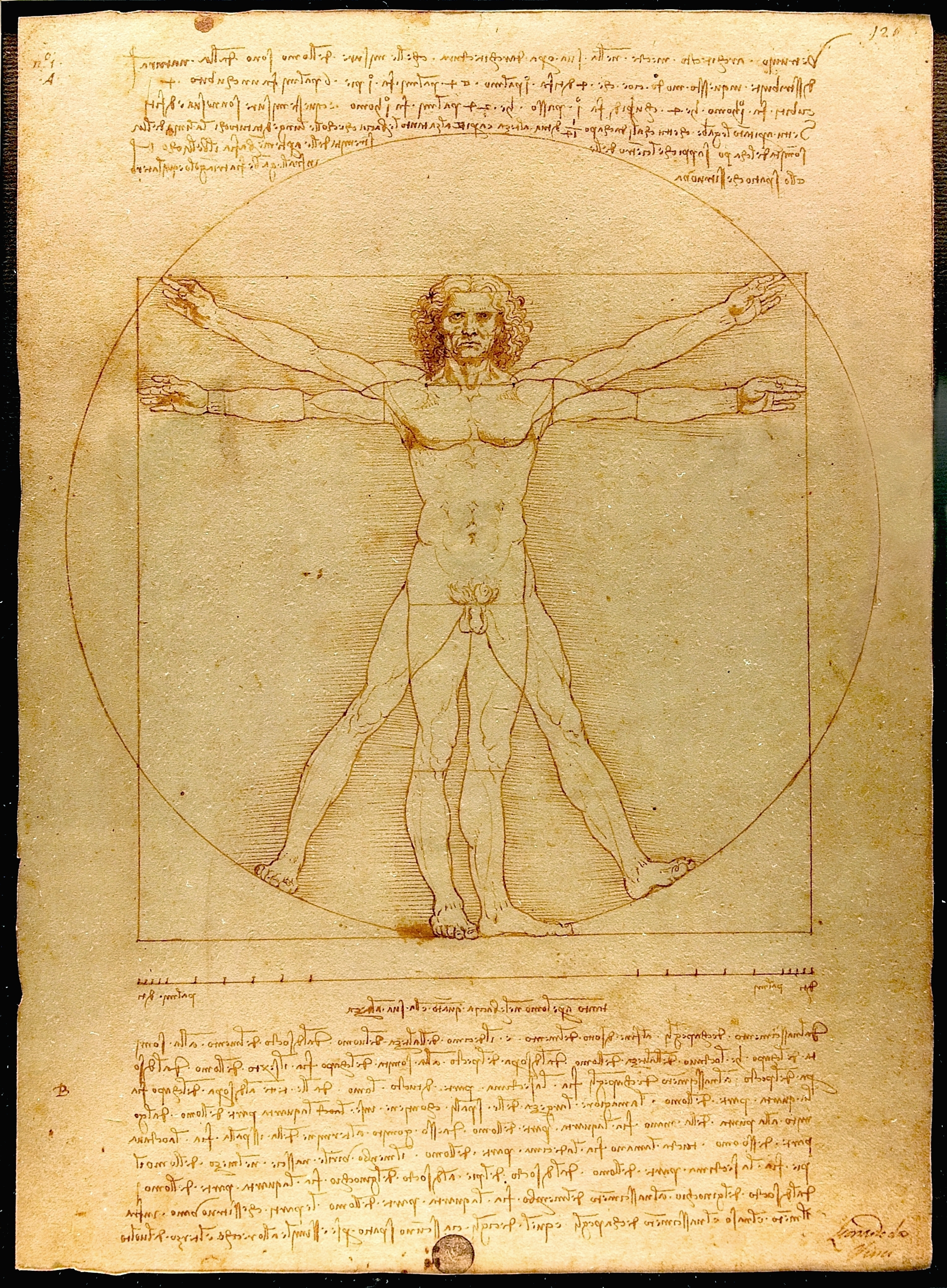
The Vitruvian Man, one of Leonardo's drawing owned by Bossi

Bossi was a passionate archaeologist, bibliophile and collector, constantly acquiring coins, paintings, sculpture, antiques and especially prints and drawings. His collection of prints served not so much to satisfy aesthetic needs as to provide documentary evidence to further his knowledge of art history. He was particularly interested in the Lombard school, collecting many drawings by Giovanni Ambrogio Figino (then little known) and Leonardo, regarded as the founder of the school. He also owned a considerable body of drawings by Neoclassical artists, often given to him by such friends as Canova, Giuseppe Cades, Camuccini, Giuseppe Bernardino Bison, Appiani, Luigi Sabatelli and Giocondo Albertolli, as well as a collection of copies of Renaissance works by David Pierre Humbert de Superville that reveals an early interest in the Italian ‘Primitives’. His collection of 3092 drawings, prints and engravings was auctioned in 1818; it was acquired in 1820 by the Venetian abbot Luigi Celotti and in 1822 by the Accademia di Belle Arti di Venezia, where it remains in the Galleria dell’Accademia.

== Gallery ==
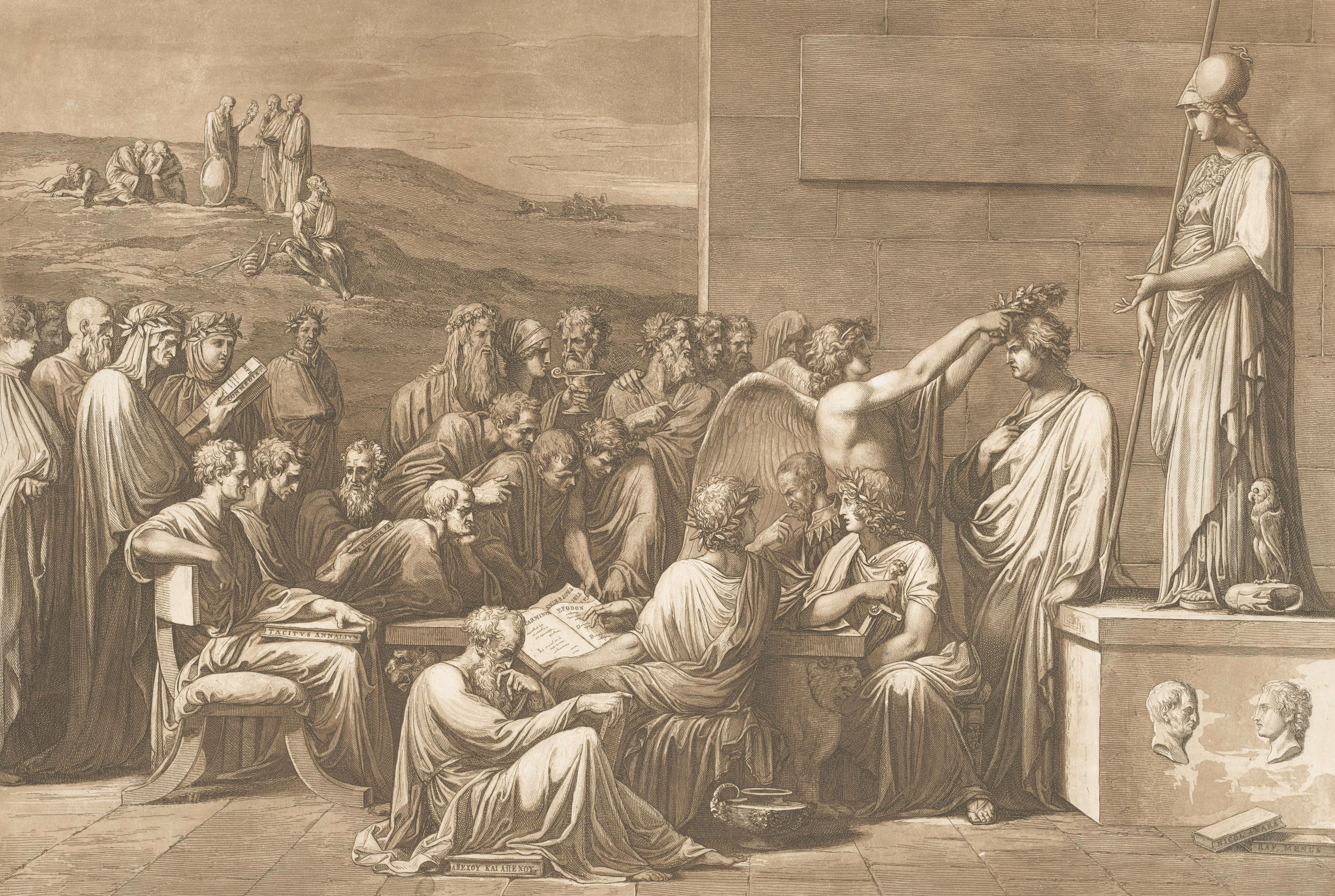
Allegorical Glorification of the Printer Giovanni Battista Bodoni, Rijksmuseum, Amsterdam

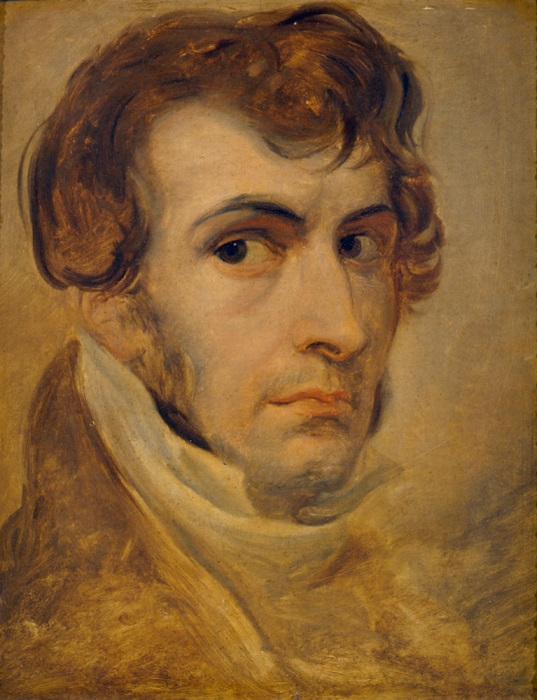
Self-portrait, Pinacoteca di Brera, Milan

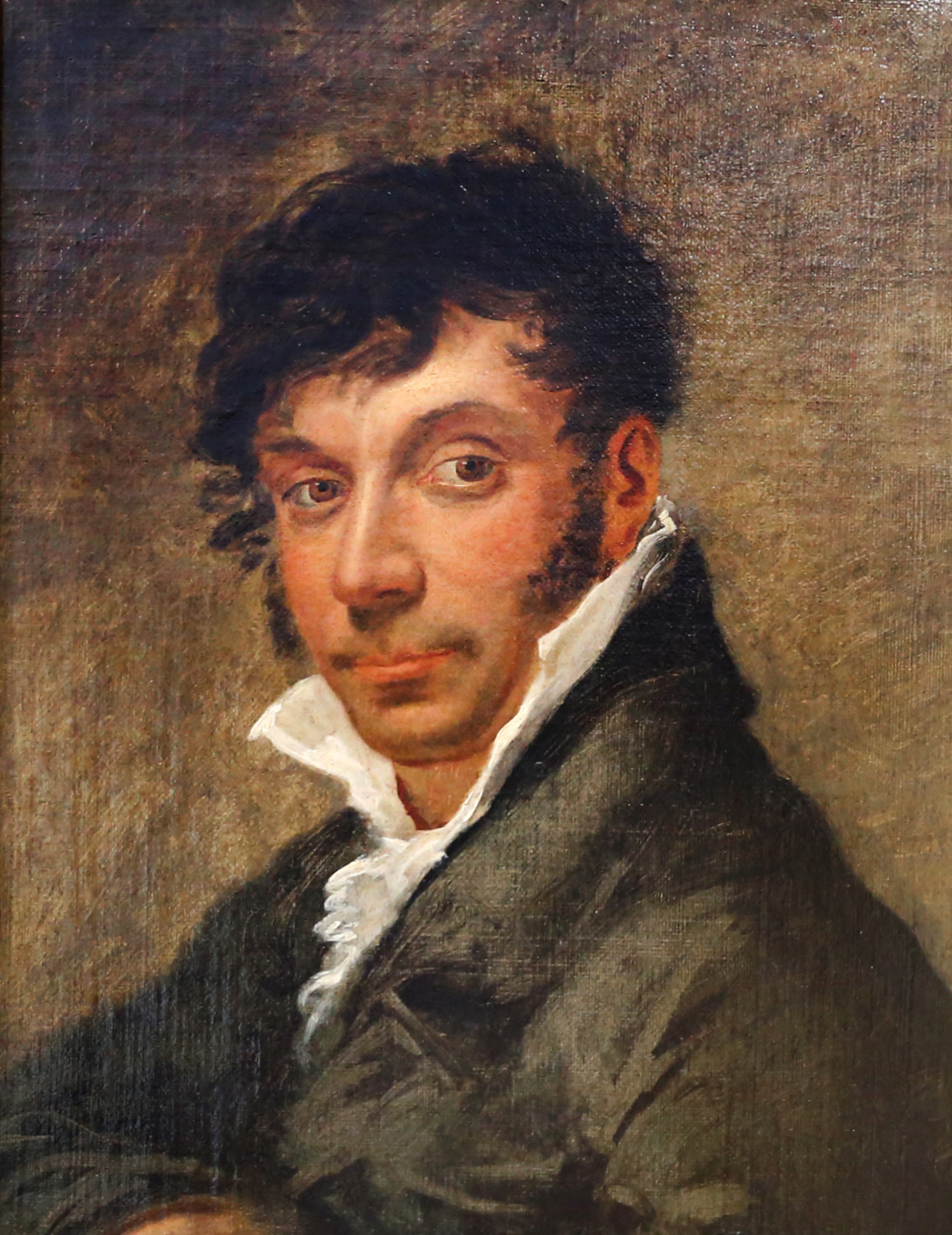
Portrait of man, priv. col.

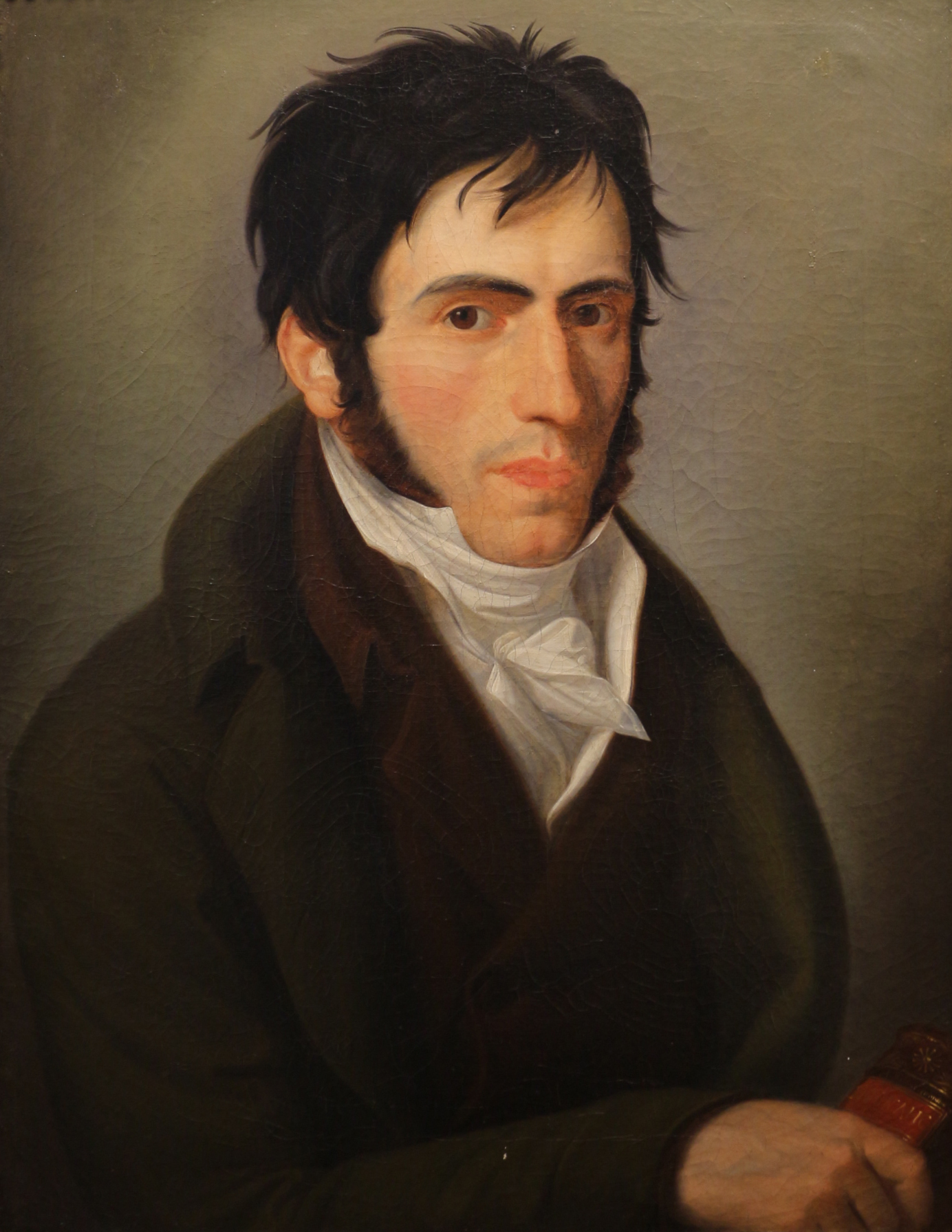
Portrait of Felice Bellotti, Galleria d'Arte Moderna, Milan

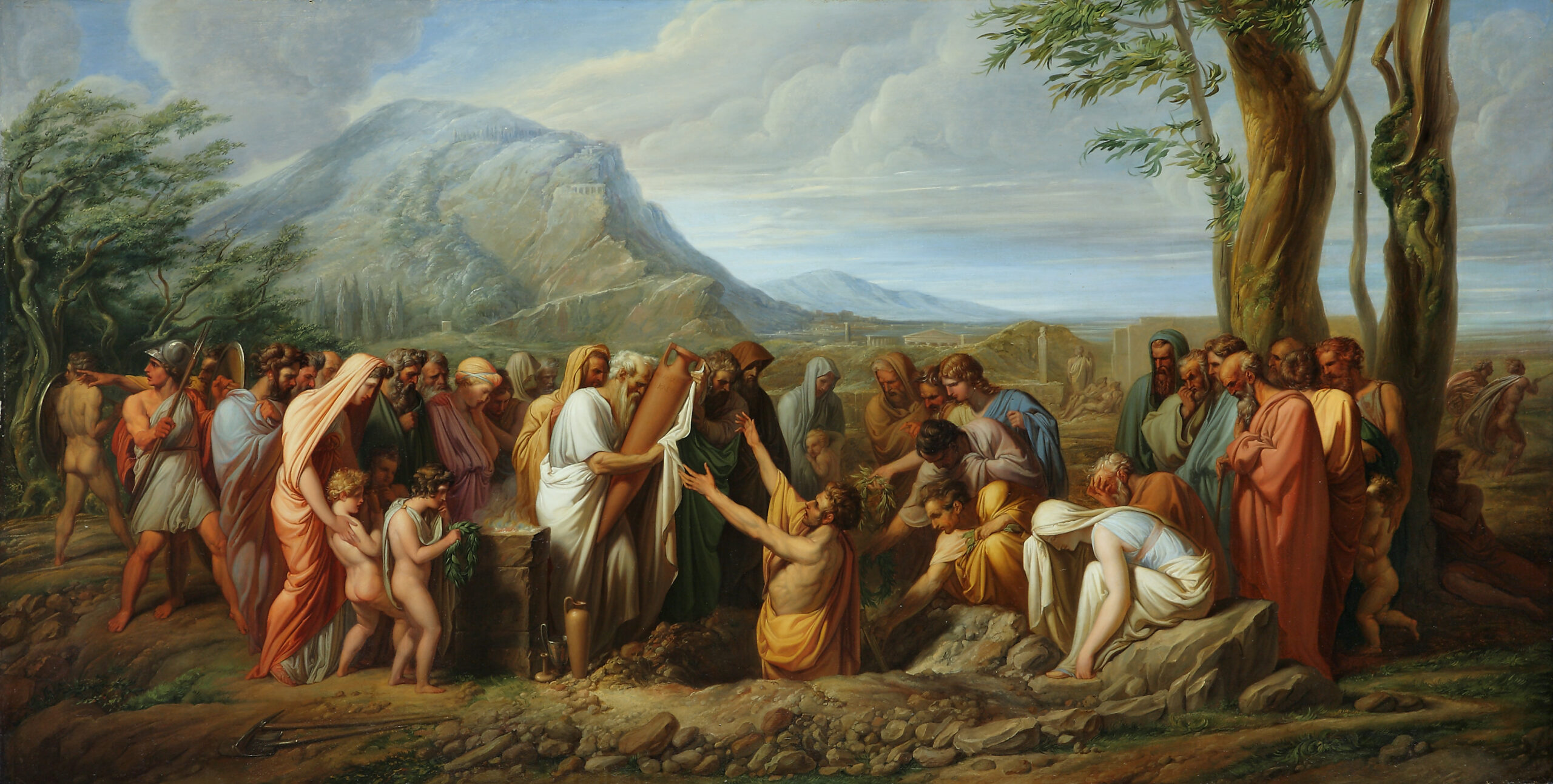
The Burial of Themistocles' Ashes, Pinacoteca di Brera, Milan

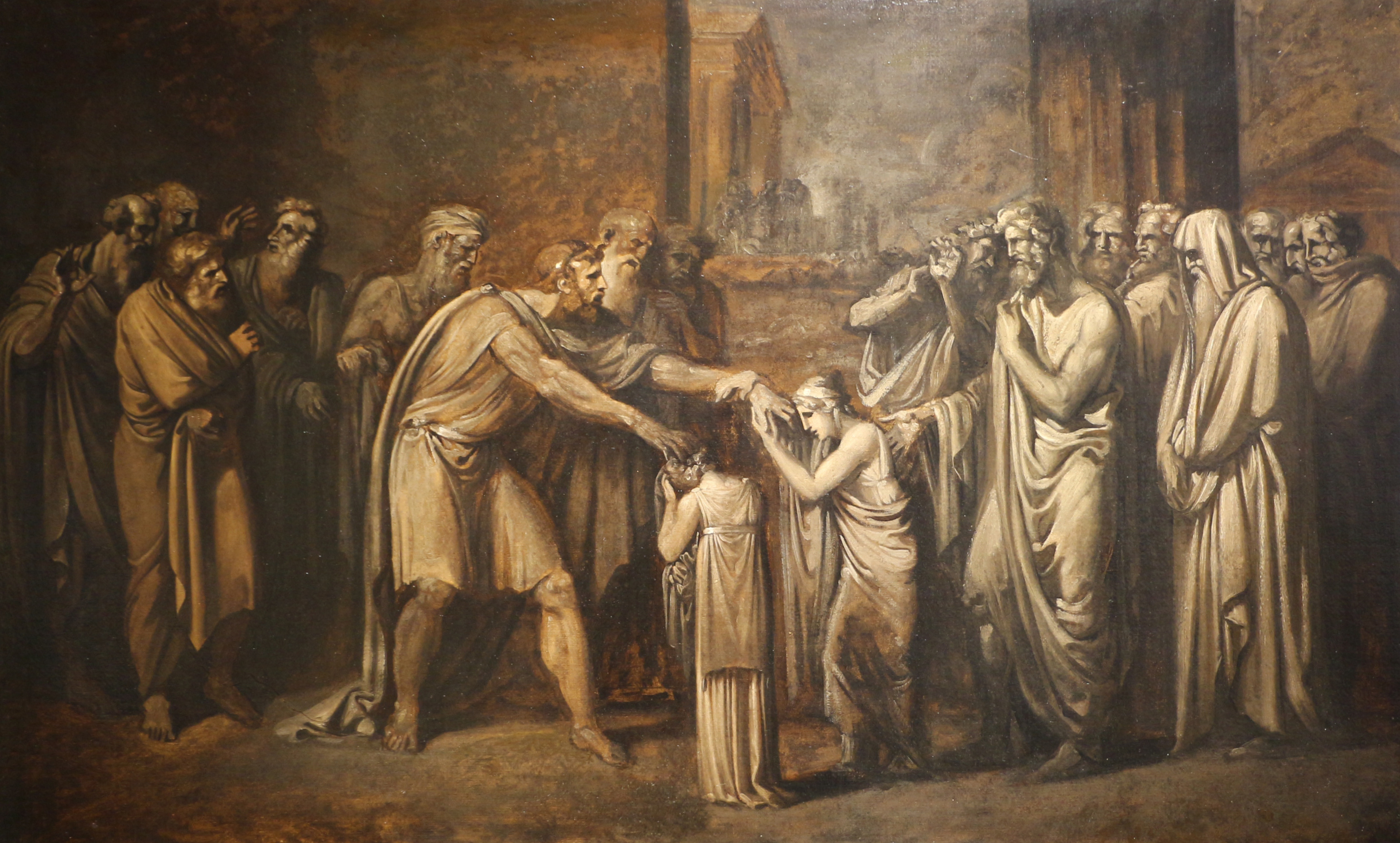
Oedipus at Colonus, Galleria d'Arte Moderna, Milan

== Writings ==
- R. P. Ciardi, ed. (1982). Scritti sulle arti. Florence: S.P.E.S.
