= Marianna Candidi Dionigi =

Italian artist, writer (1756–1826)

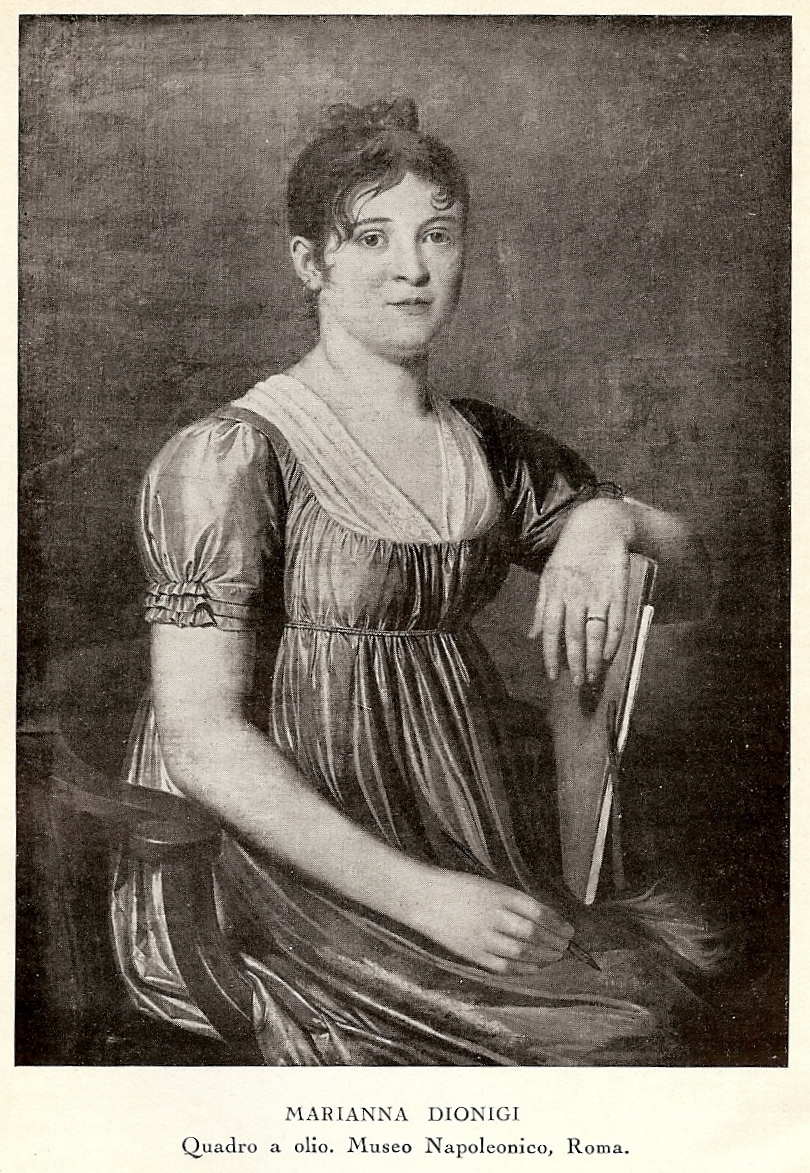
- Born: 3 February 1756; Rome
- Died: 10 June 1826 (aged 70); Lanuvio
- Education: Academy of Fine Arts
- Spouse: Domenico Dionigi
- Children: 7

Marianna Candidi Dionigi (1756-1826) born in Rome, was an Italian painter, writer and salonnière who took an interest in archaeology. She wrote archaeological descriptions of buildings and monuments during a journey in Lazio.

== Biography ==
Dionigi was born to Giuseppe and Maddalena Candidi Scilla, an aristocratic Roman family, in 1756. She was well educated, speaking various languages, and an excellent musician. She also took an interest in both archaeology and painting, studying initially under the landscape painter Carlo Labruzzi, then studying at the Academy of Fine Arts of Perugia.

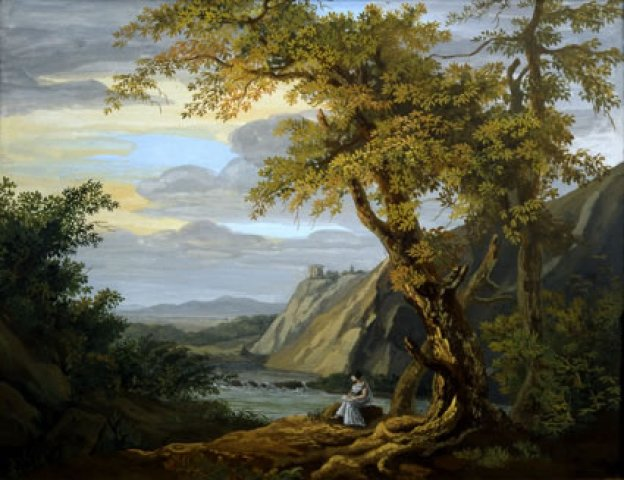
Paesaggio by Dionigi

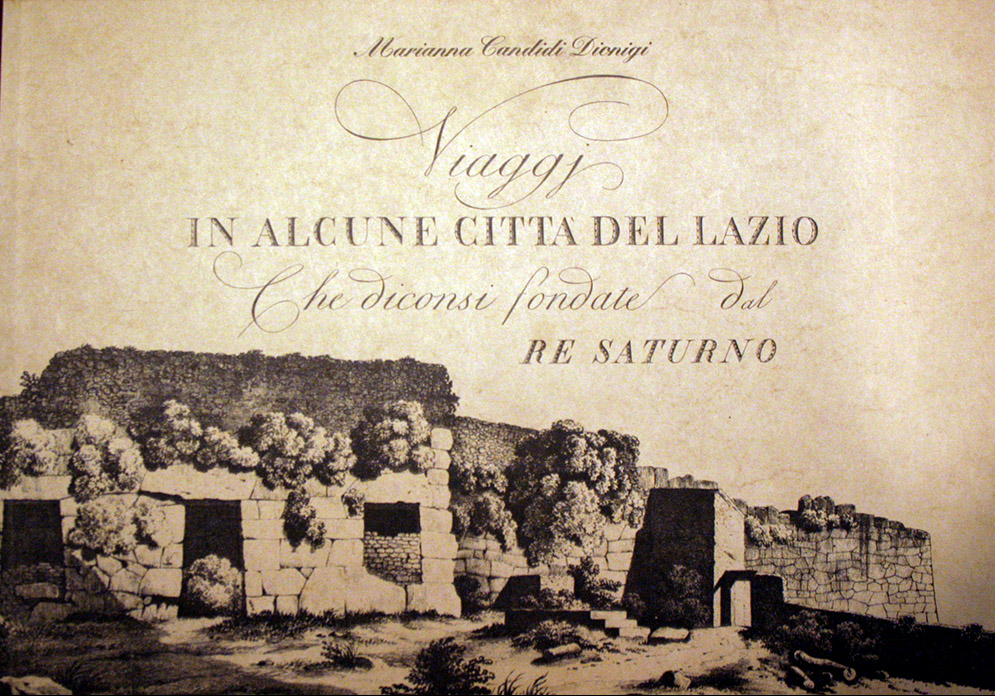
Dionigi's book

Dionigi wrote a monograph on painting and about her travels through Lazio. The story is told in a series of letters from a 50 year old woman. She describes archaeological sites and each letter was accompanied by a sketch. She describes five towns south of Rome which had been believed to have been founded by the mythological god Saturn. Each of the etchings were detailed and accurate. Moreover Dioigi included plans and elevations and transcribed inscriptions.

She was a salon hostess and she was a friend of Vincenzo Monti, Shelley, Antonio Canova, Giacomo Leopardi and the archeologist Jean Baptiste d'Agincourt. As a young woman she married the jurist Domenico Dionigi, a Count of the Lateran Palace and aristocrat from Ferrara. They had seven children. Her drawings and paintings were displayed at the Palazzo della Cancelleria, the Accademia di San Luca, and the Reggia di Caserta. She died in Lanuvio.

Dionigi died in 1826 in Lanuvio.
