= Carlo Maria Giudici =

Italian painter (1723–1804)

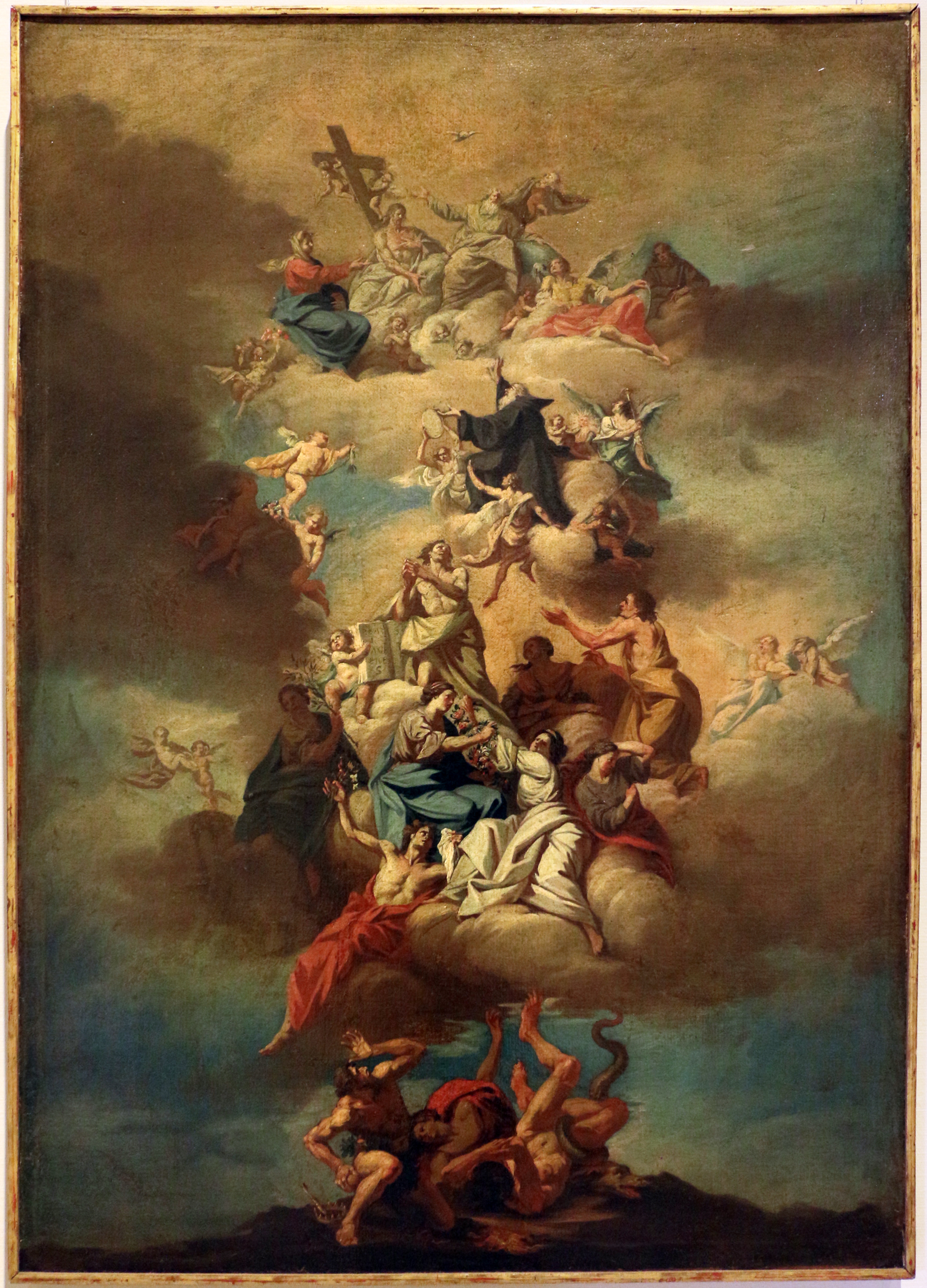
Glory of Saint Francis of Padua, 1750–60 circa, Castello Sforzesco, Milan

Carlo Maria Giudici (1723 in Viggiù – 1804 in Milan) was an Italian painter. He was born in Viggiù and became a professor at the Brera Academy of Milan. Among his pupils were Giovanni Battista Riccardi, il Sala, and Andrea Appiani.
