= Carlo Labruzzo =

Italian painter (1748–1817)

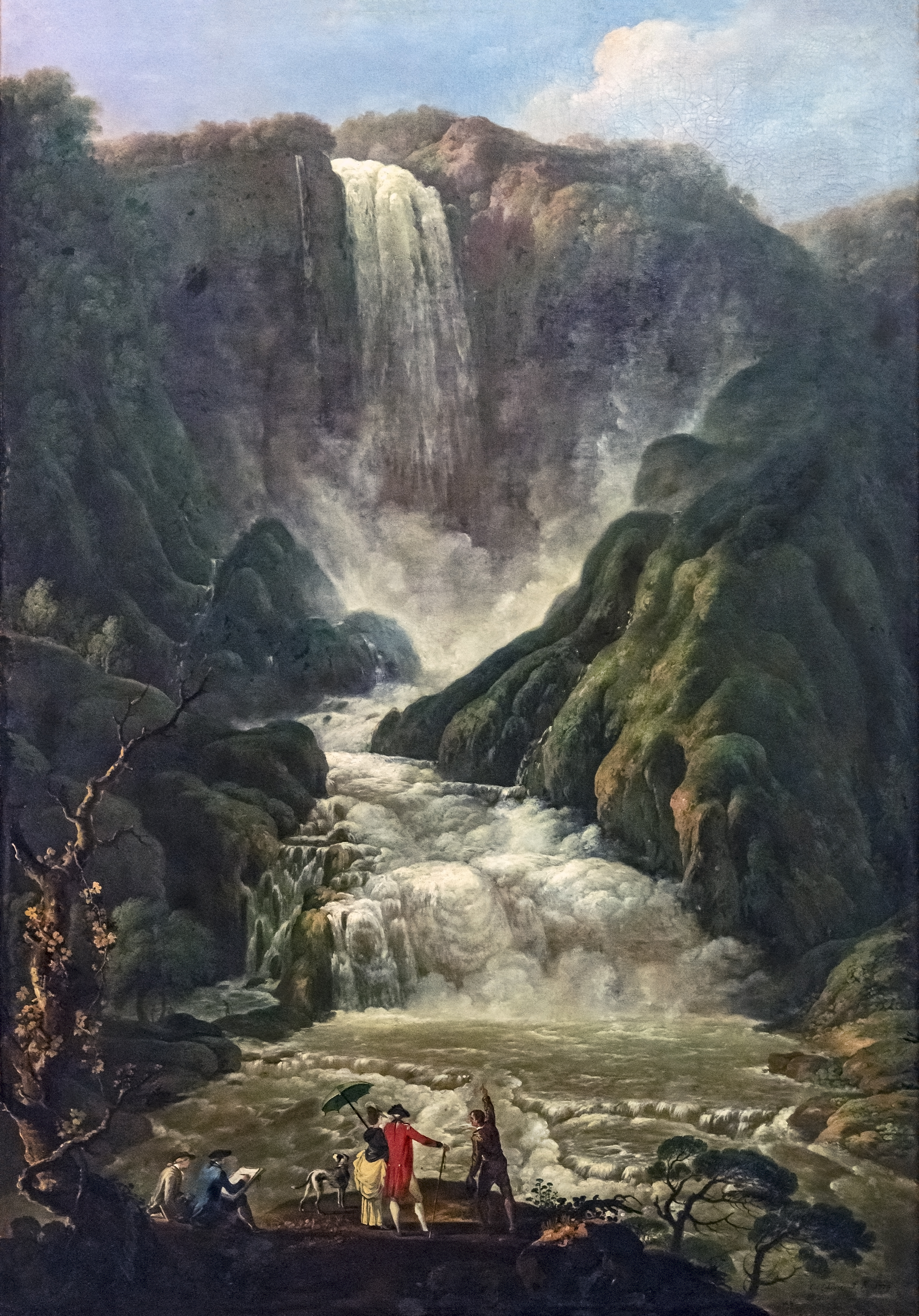
Cascade of Terni

Carlo Labruzzi (1748–1817) was an Italian painter, primarily of landscapes who was born in Rome.

In 1798, he was nominated professor at the Academy of Fine Arts of Perugia, and in 1812, he became director. He died in Perugia in December 1817. He was replaced by Tommaso Minardi. Among his pupils in Perugia were Silvestro Massari, Margherita Lazi, and Marianna Candidi Dionigi.
