= Basilica of San Martino =

Church building in Alzano Lombardo, Italy

Coordinates: 45°44′02″N 9°43′51″E

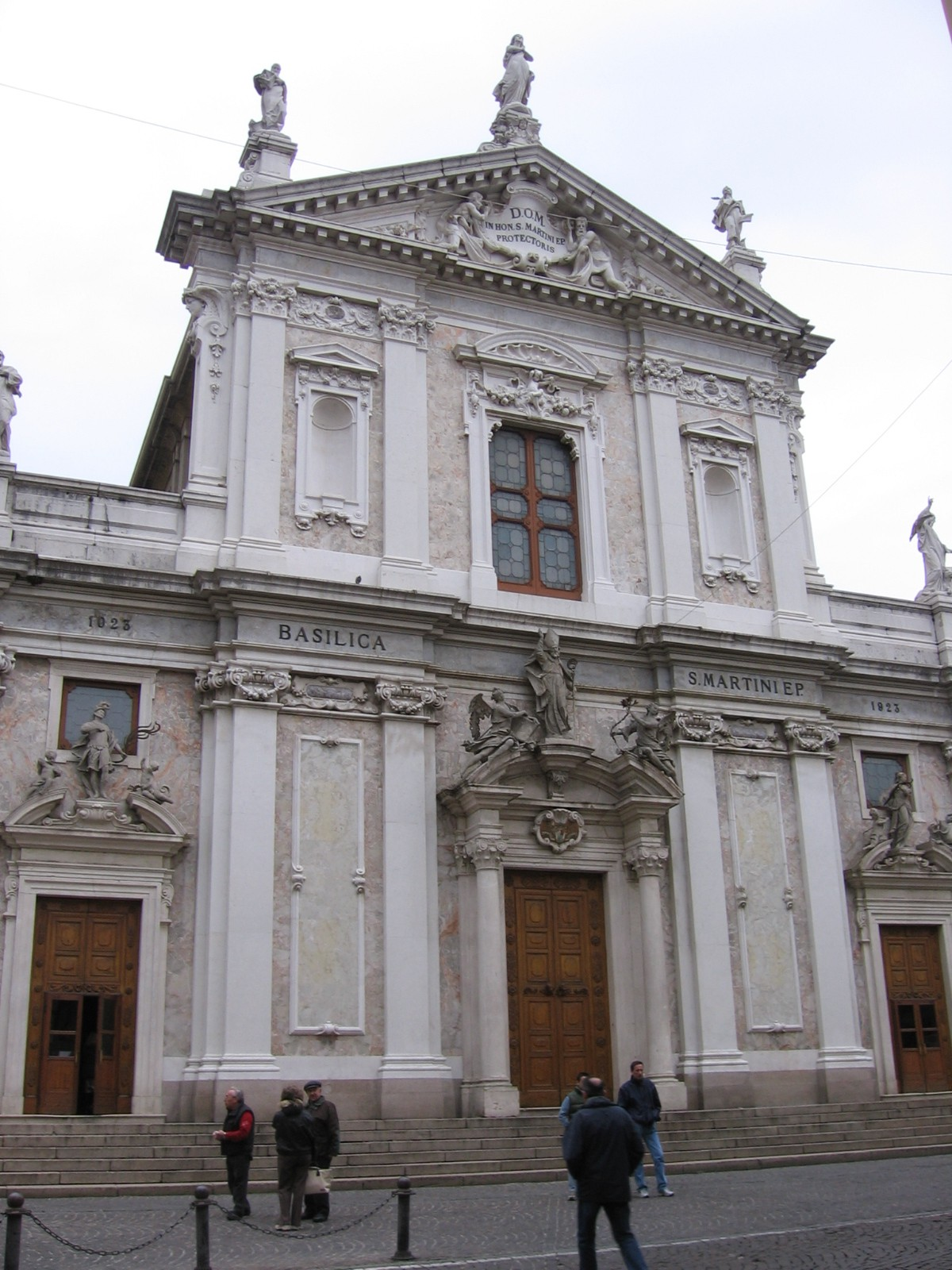

The Basilica of San Martino is a church in piazza Italia at the junction of via Fantoni and via Roma in the historic centre of the north Italian town of Alzano Lombardo. Dedicated to Martin of Tours, it was promoted to the status of a minor basilica in 1922 by Pope Pius XI. Adjoining it is the San Martino Museum of Religious Art, named after the basilica.

== History ==
It is first recorded in 1023, when it occupied a much smaller buildings. Several others were built over it over the centuries, including the much larger 15th century version with a stone campanile, of which only the campanile survives. Early in the 17th century the generous bequest of 1,700 scudi from Bernardino Fugazza, a citizen of the town, allowed the chancel to be rebuilt. At the same time the paintings The Miracle of St Martin and Saint Martin in his Cathedra were commissioned from Gian Paolo Cavagna, as well as St Martin and the Poor Man on the counter-facade.

The present structure also dates to the 17th century and another bequest, this one in 1656 70,000 gold scudi from the local merchant Nicolò Valle to the church's 'Fabbriceria', the body charged with building maintenance. It was decided to spend the money on a completely new building, designed by Gerolamo Quadrio, chief architect of Milan Cathedral, who decided to retain the new chancel. The foundation stone was laid on 3 April 1659 and work took about ten years.

== Bibliography ==
- (in Italian) Luigi Pagnoni, Chiese parrocchiali bergamasche: appunti di storia e arte, Bergamo 1992, 324.
- (in Italian) A. Mandelli, Alzano nei secoli, Bergamo, 1988
- (in Italian) Riccardo Panigada, La Basilica diSan martino e le sue sagrestie, Normaeditrice, 2009.
