= Alzano Lombardo =

- Comune
- Città di Alzano Lombardo
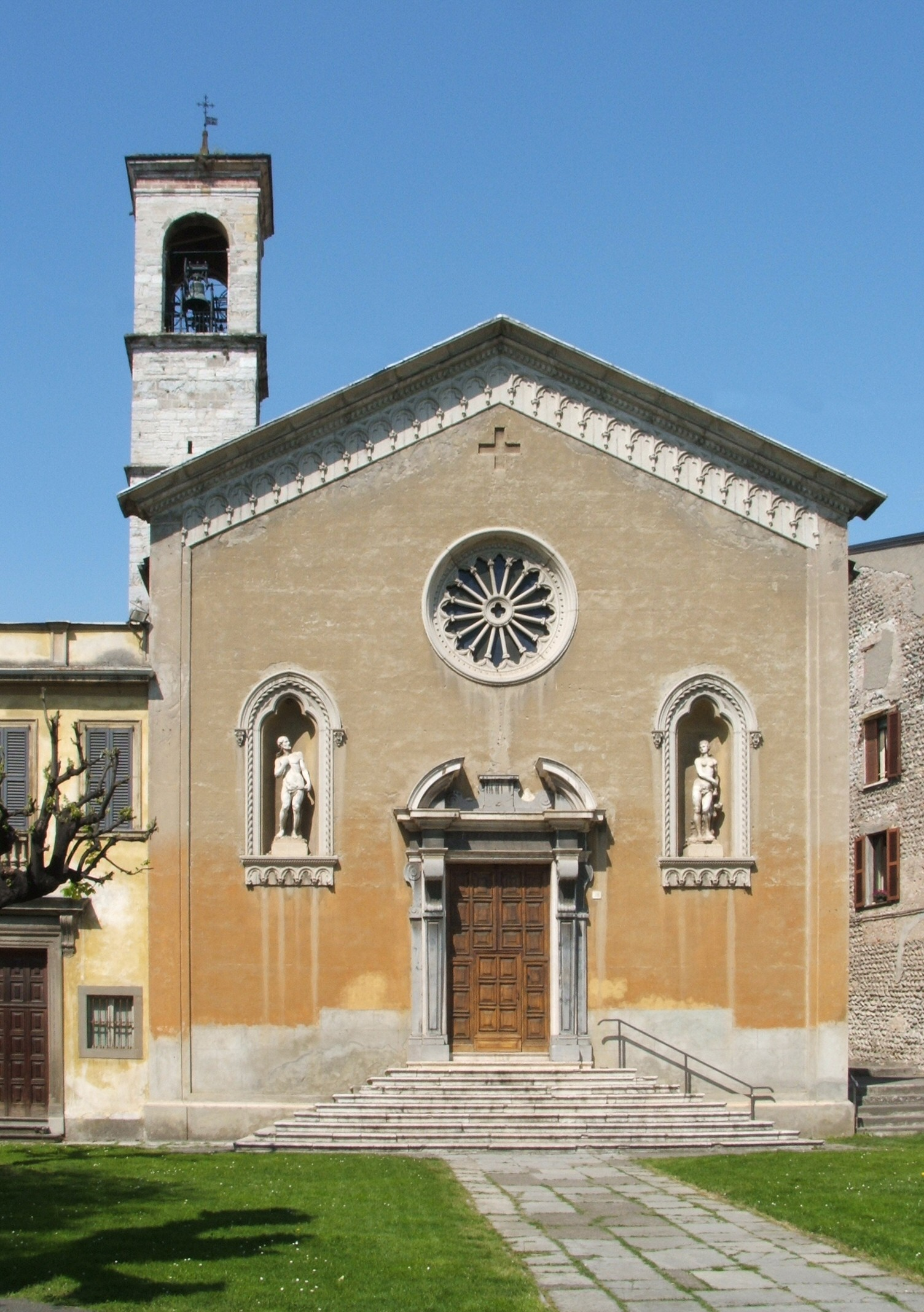
- Saint Peter's Church, Alzano Lombardo

- Coat of arms

- Location of Alzano Lombardo in Italy Alzano Lombardo (Lombardy)
- Coordinates: 45°43′54″N 9°43′43″E
- Country: Italy
- Region: Lombardy
- Province: Province of Bergamo (BG)
- Frazioni: Alzano Sopra, Nese, Monte di Nese, Burro, Busa, Brumano, Olera

Government
  - Mayor: Camillo Bertocchi

Area
  - Total: 13.43 km^{2} (5.19 sq mi)
- Elevation: 304 m (997 ft)

Population (30 January 2026)
  - Total: 13,379
  - Density: 996.2/km^{2} (2,580/sq mi)
- Demonym: Alzanesi
- Time zone: UTC+1 (CET)
  - Summer (DST): UTC+2 (CEST)
- Postal code: 24022
- Dialing code: 035
- ISTAT code: 016008
- Patron saint: San Martino
- Saint day: 11 November
- Website: Official website

Alzano Lombardo (Bergamasque: Lsà) is a comune in the province of Bergamo, Lombardy, northern Italy.

Alzano received the honorary title of city with a presidential decree of 11 March 1991. It is home to the San Martino Museum of Religious Art and the Basilica of San Martino.

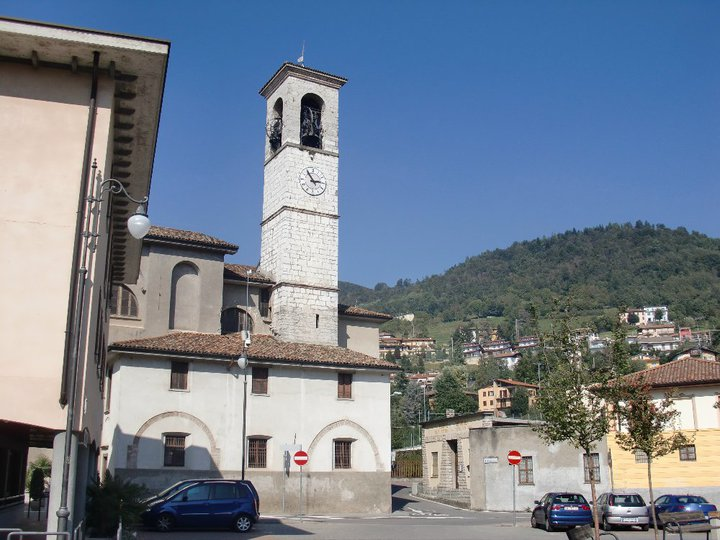
Saint Giorgio's Church, Nese

Nese is a frazione of the comune of Alzano Lombardo. It has around 4000 inhabitants.
