= Jean Baptiste Seroux d'Agincourt =

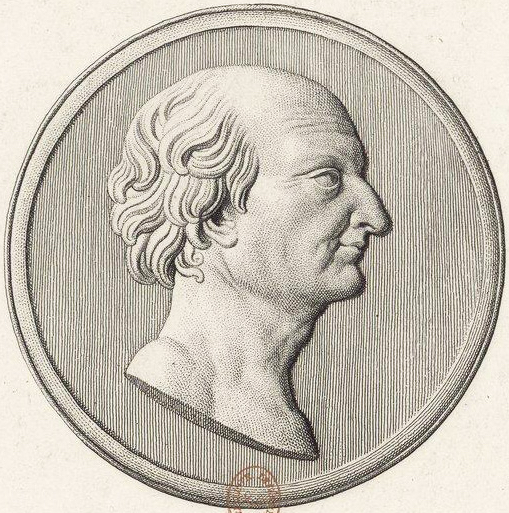
- Born: Jean Baptiste Louis George Seroux D'Agincourt; 5 April 1730; Beauvais
- Died: 24 September 1814 (aged 84); Rome
- Occupations: Antiquarian; Archaeologist

Jean Baptiste Louis George Seroux D'Agincourt (5 April 1730 – 24 September 1814) was a French archaeologist and historian.

Born in Beauvais, he was a descendant of the counts of Namur, and in his youth he served as an officer in a regiment of cavalry. Finding it necessary to quit the army in order to take charge of his younger brothers who had been left orphans, he was appointed a farmer-general by Louis XV. In 1777 he visited England, Germany and the Dutch Republic; and in the following year he travelled through Italy, with the view of exploring thoroughly the remains of ancient art. He afterwards settled in Rome and devoted himself to preparing the results of his researches for publication.

He died in 1814, leaving the work, which was being issued in parts, unfinished; but it was carried on by M. Gence, and published complete under the title L'Histoire de l'Art par les monuments, depuis sa décadence au quatrième siècle jusqu'à son renouvellement au seizième (6 vols. fol. with 325 plates, Paris, 1823). In the year of his death D'Agincourt published in Paris a Recueil de fragments de sculpture antique, en terre cuite.
