= Fiumelatte =

Fiumelatte may refer to:

- Fiumelatte (river)
- Fiumelatte (Varenna), frazione of Varenna, Italy
