= Pirelli (surname) =

Pirelli is an Italian surname. Notable people with the surname include:

- Gennaro Pirelli (born 2000), Italian judoka
- Giovanni Battista Pirelli (1848–1932), Italian entrepreneur, engineer and politician, founder of Pirelli
- Leopoldo Pirelli (1925–2007), Italian businessman
- Piero Pirelli (1881–1956), Italian entrepreneur

== See also ==
- Pirelli
- Pirelli (disambiguation)
