= Villa Monastero =

Building in Varenna, Italy

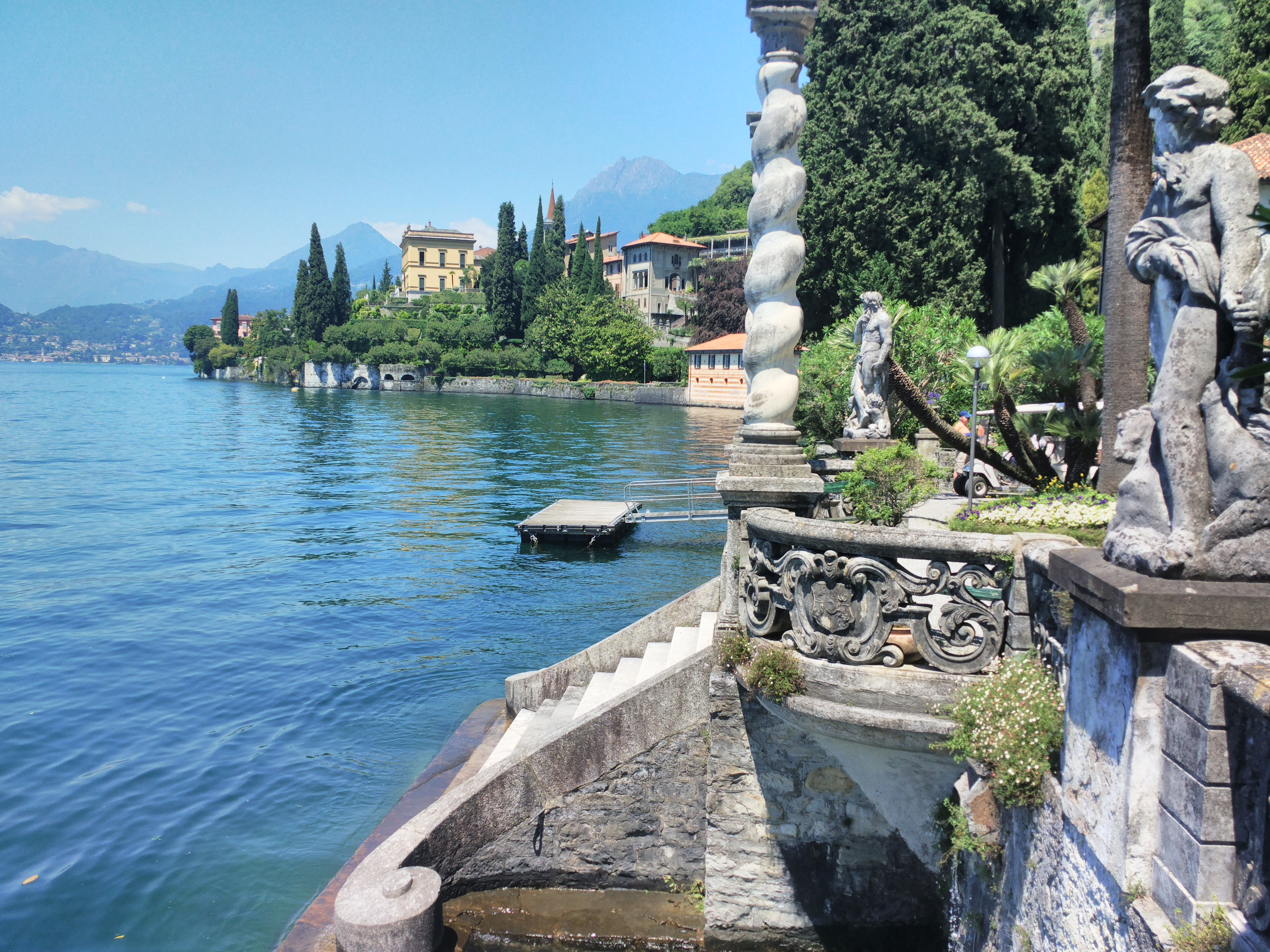
- Interactive map of the Villa Monastero area

General information
- Architectural style: eclectic, Nordic
- Location: Via Polvani, 4, Varenna, Italy
- Coordinates: 46.009279°N 9.285496°E
- Construction started: 12th century
- Renovated: 1897-1909
- Owner: Province of Lecco

Other information
- Parking: Parking garage

Villa Monastero is located in Varenna, Province of Lecco, on the shore of Lake Como. It includes a botanical garden, a museum, and a convention center, contains precious architecture, period furniture, works of art and a beautiful park that extends to Fiumelatte (river) with paths overlooking the lake, tall cypresses and many species of exotic plants.

== Geography ==
The villa lies south of the village, halfway between Varenna and Fiumelatte, overlooking the banks of the Lario.

== History ==
Villa Monastero is an eclectic villa built in the Nordic style.

The site was originally a Cistercian convent, founded at the end of the 12th century in Varenna, which now lies beneath the modern building. The convent grew in importance and wealth, purchasing many properties, especially around Lierna, but eventually declined to only six mothers, and was closed by papal bull in 1567.

The whole estate was purchased by Paolo Mornico in 1569, using his fortune amassed through iron mining in Valsassinia, who transformed it into a prestigious residence. In the 17th century the Mornico family incrementally rebuilt and decorated it in the eclectic style.

Walter Kees of Leipzig bought the villa in the 1890s, and between 1897 and 1909 carried out modifications which give its current Eclectic style. Some of the architects involved include Emilio Alemagna, Achille Majnoni, and Enrico Citterio, the construction itself was overseen by G. Bertarini of Varenna. Restoration occurred during the second half of the nineteenth century by Carolina Maumary, sister-in-law of the then prime minister of the Kingdom of Sardinia-Piedmont Massimo D'Azeglio. The final phase of construction expanded the garden, with the cooperation of Enrico Achler of Menaggio.

In 1936 the Milanese De Marchi family, originally from Switzerland, donated the villa to the public and it became a museum. In 1940 the gardens were opened to the public.

In 1953 the conference center was created. Nobel Laureates, among them Enrico Fermi, have been meeting for international courses in physics. It has been hosting summer courses for the "Enrico Fermi" International School of Physics, and as of 2013 had heard lectures by more than thirty-four Nobel Laureates.

In the 1970s, the compound was taken over by the National Research Council, and managed by the Province of Como.

In 1996, as new province boundaries were established, management passed to the Province of Lecco and the museum house founded. In 2009 the entire complex was acquired by the Province of Lecco.

=== Museum house ===
A museum house was set up within Villa Monastero, and opened to the public in 2003. It was officially recognized by Lombardy in 2005. The monumental part of the house was already completed by 1996, with 14 rooms featuring original decorations and furniture from its various owners. The museum house has been visited by more than 40,000 guests. The museum house also contains a collection of optical, electronic, and mechanical instruments originally belonging to Giovanni Polvani.

== Photo gallery ==
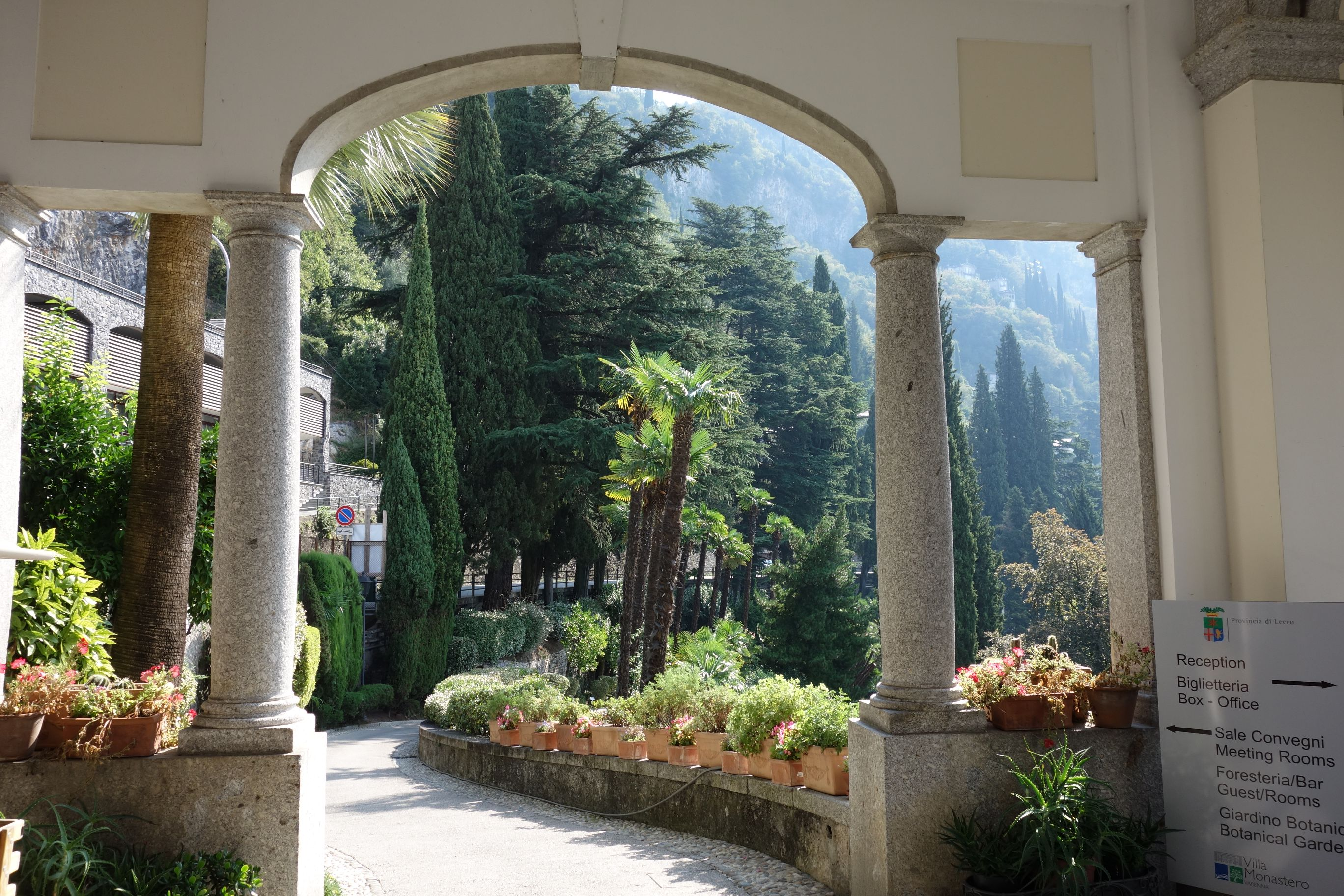
Villa Monastero garden's entrance

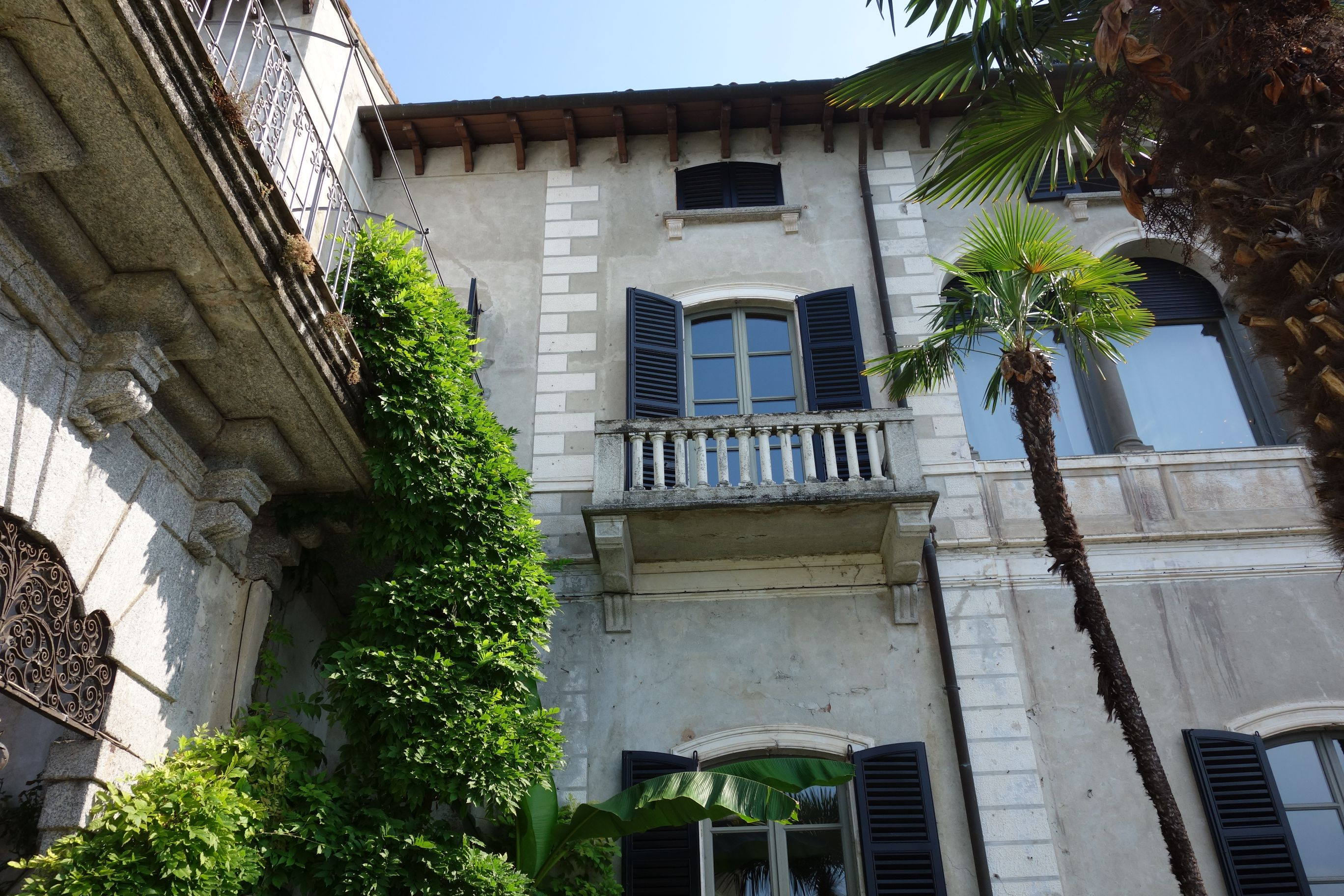
Front of Villa Monastero's building

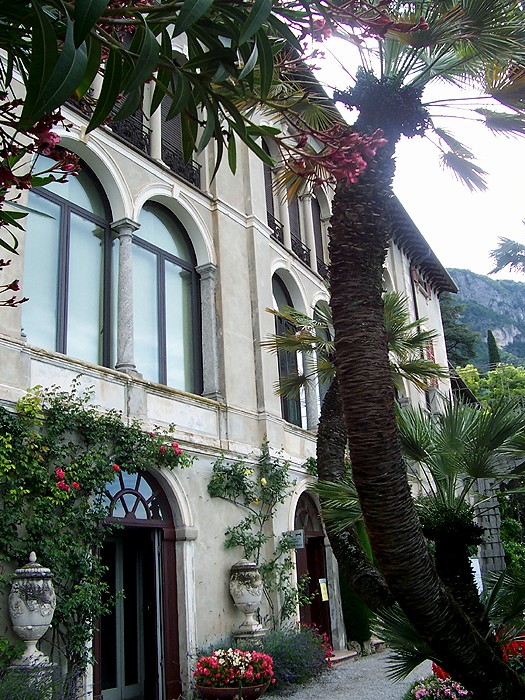
Villa Monastero museum house

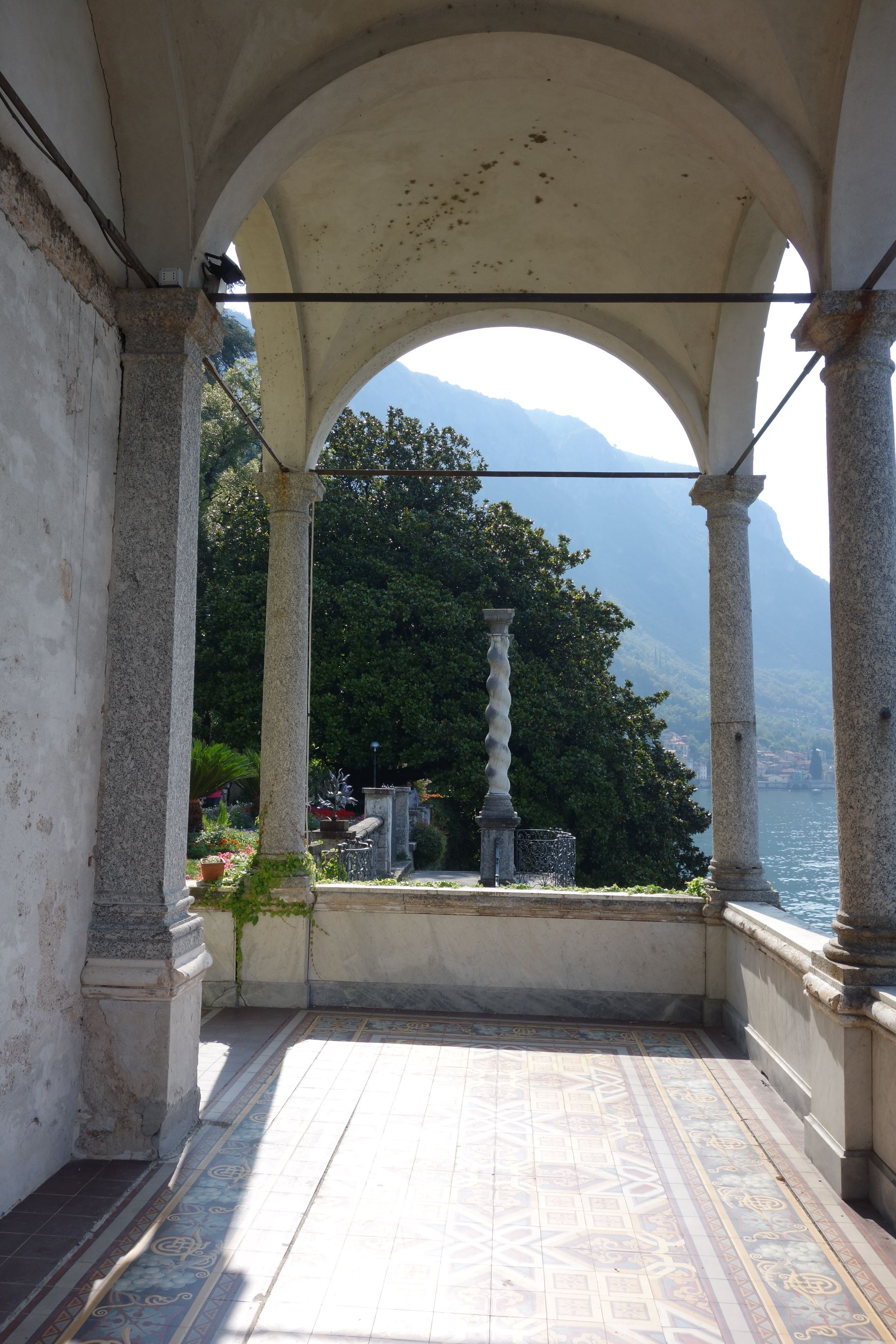
Villa Monastero's architecture

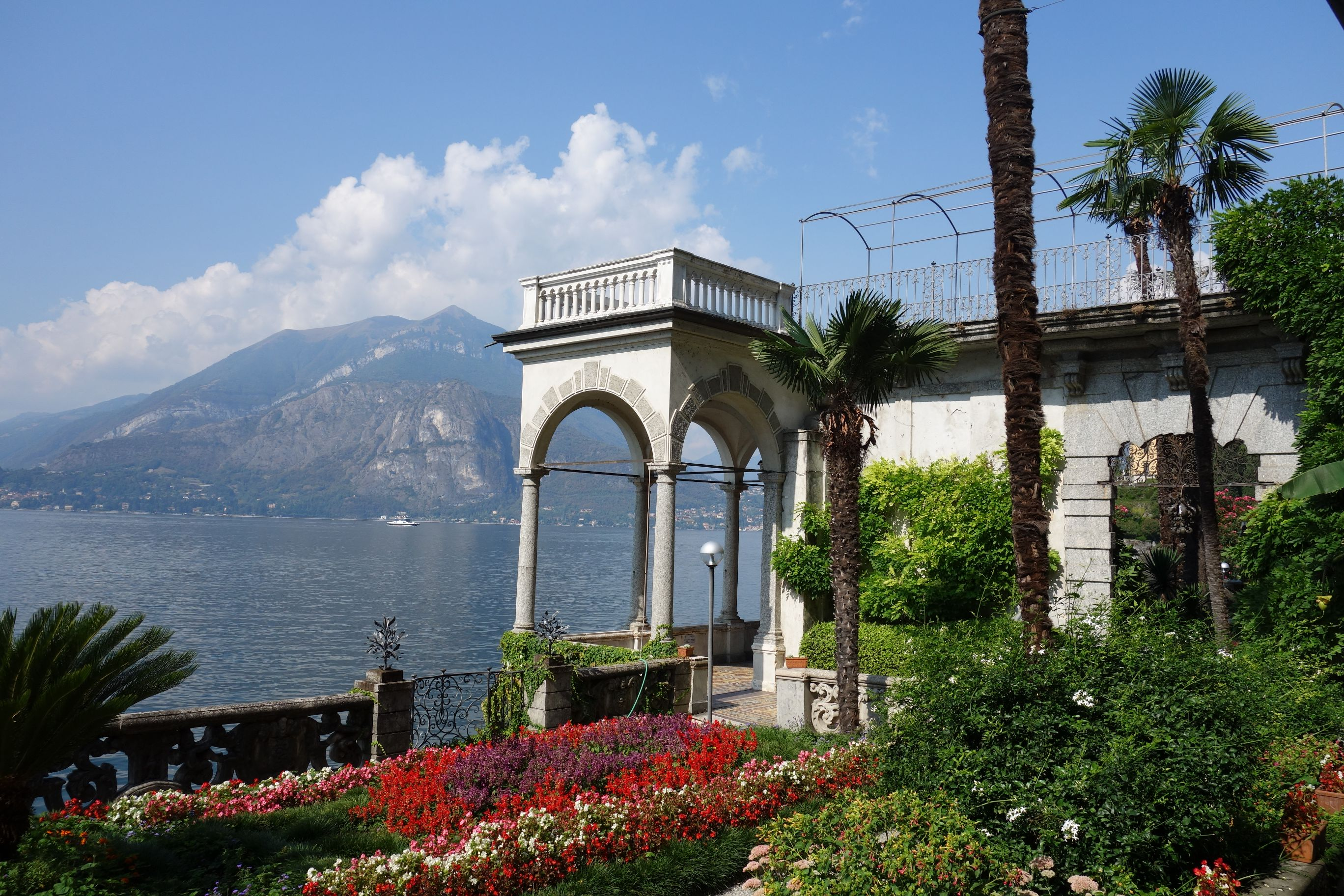
Giardino di Villa Monastero

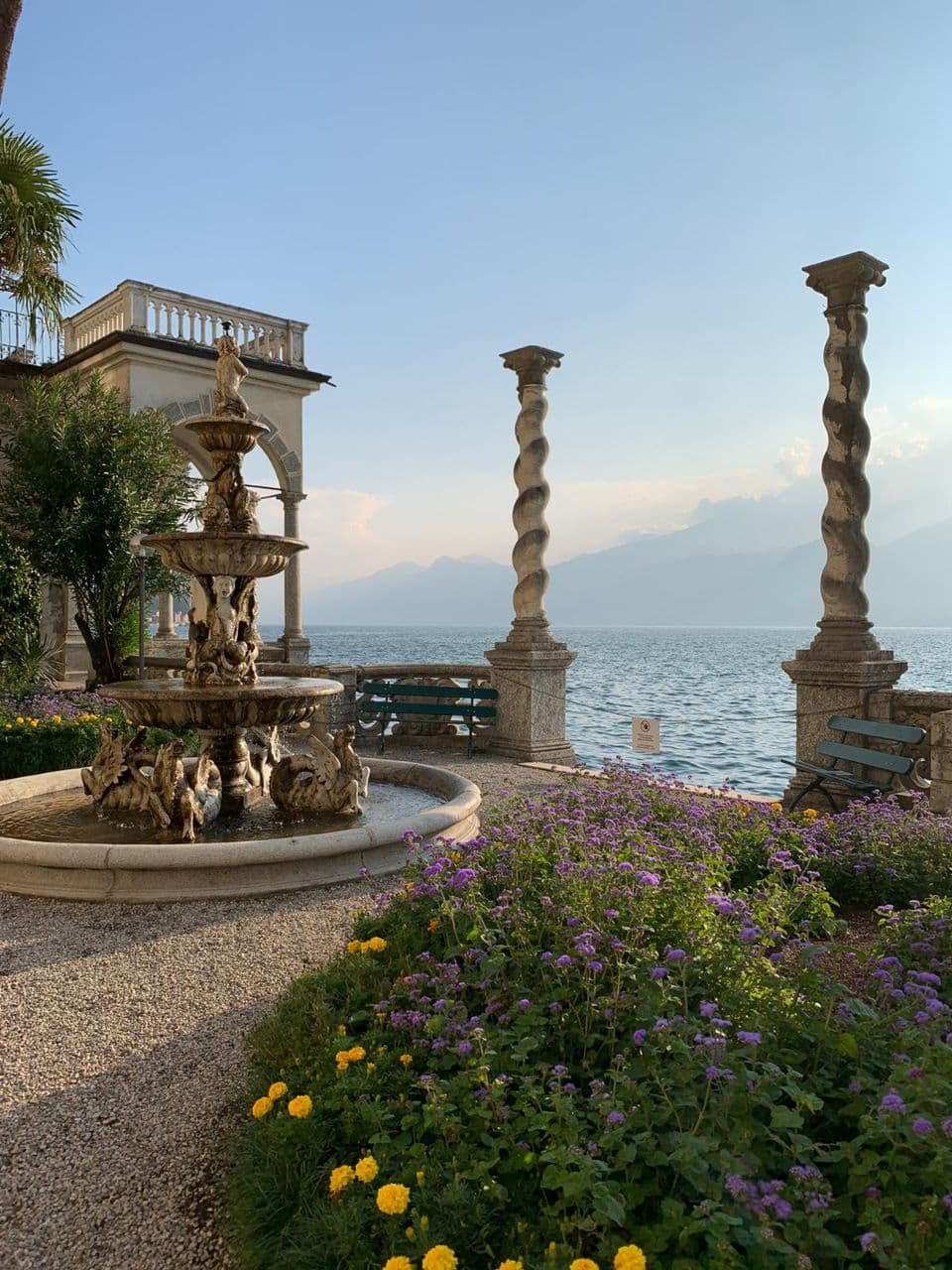
Villa Monastero's garden

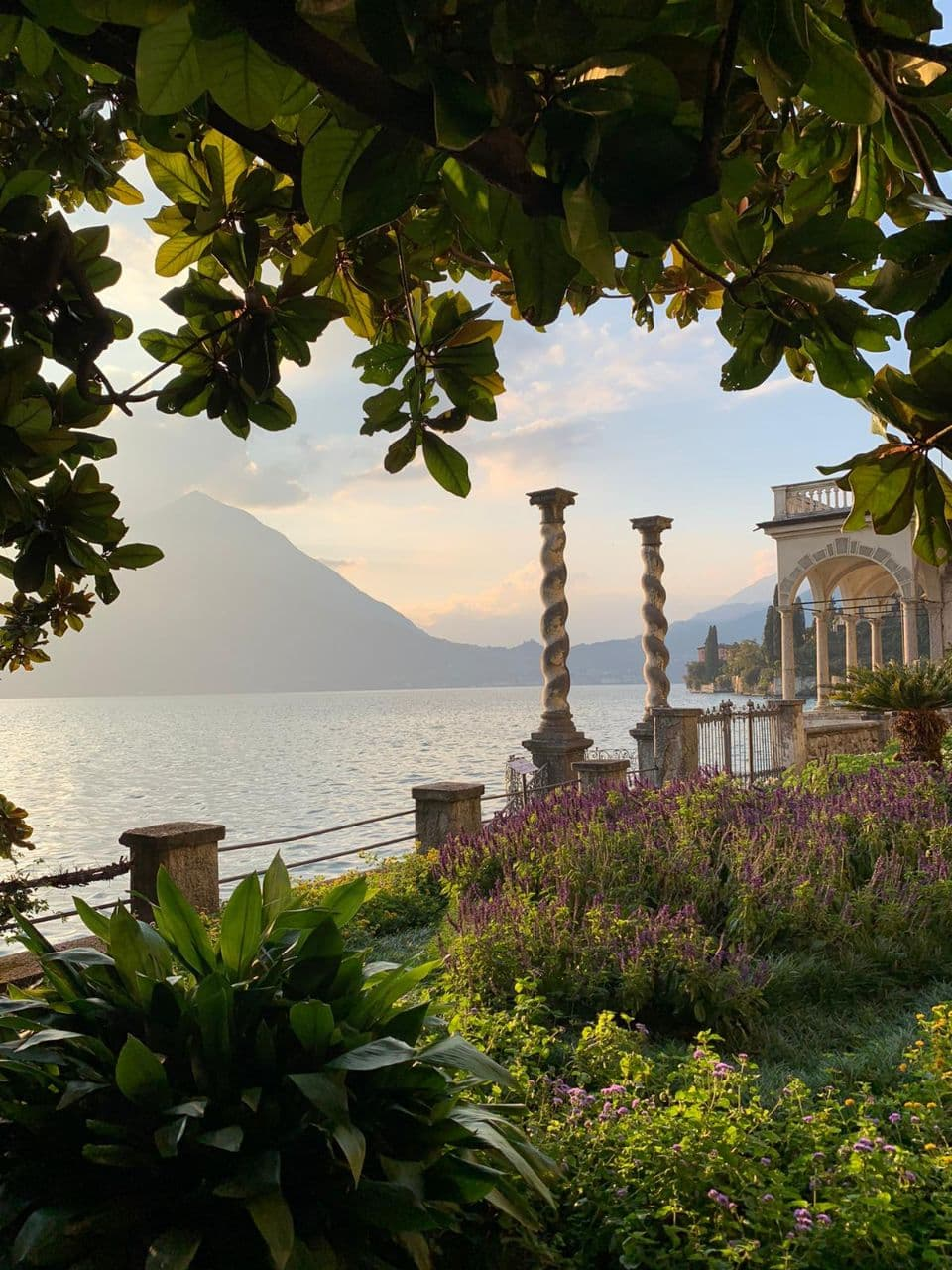
Villa Monastero's garden

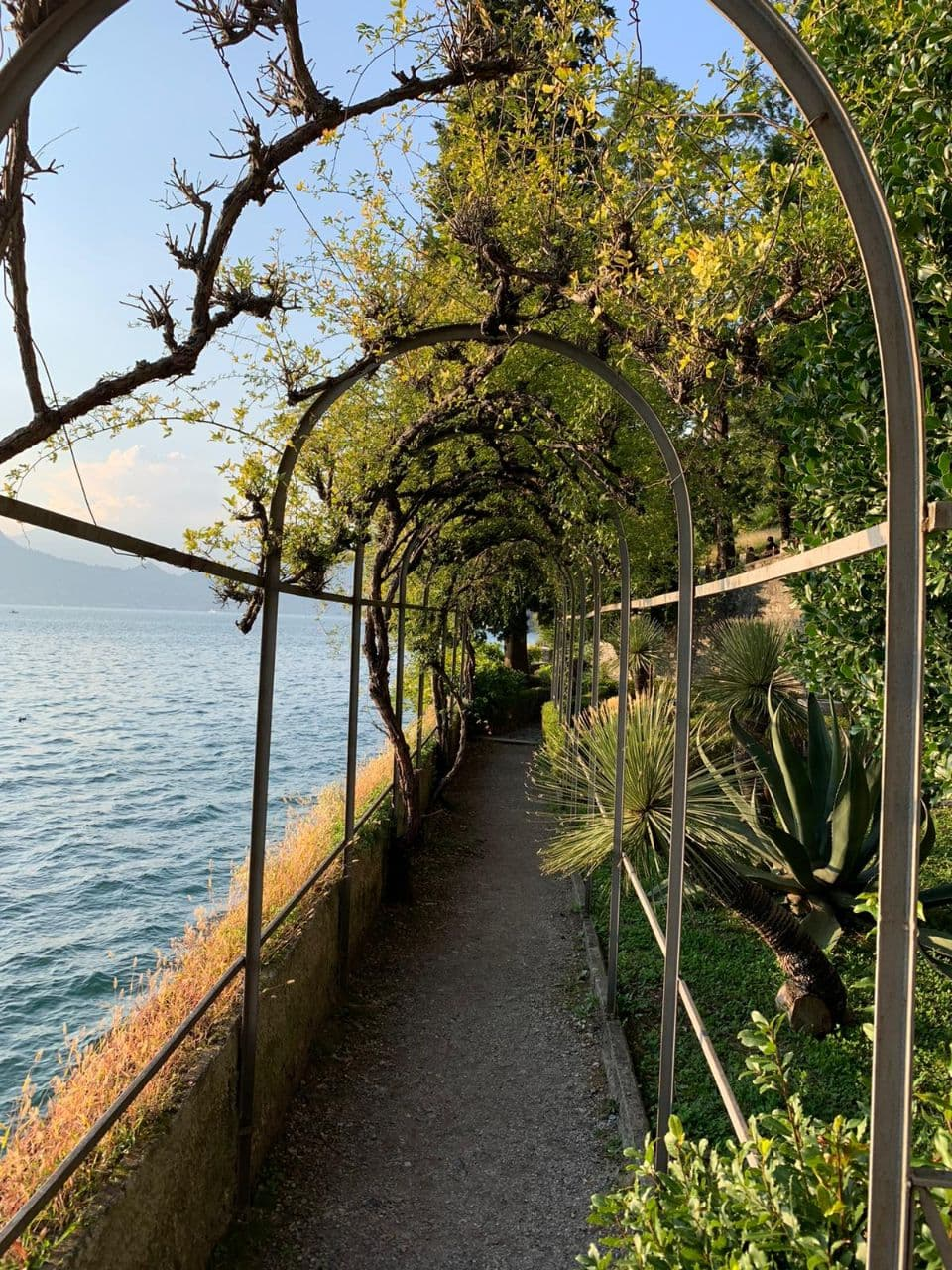
Giardino di Villa Monastero

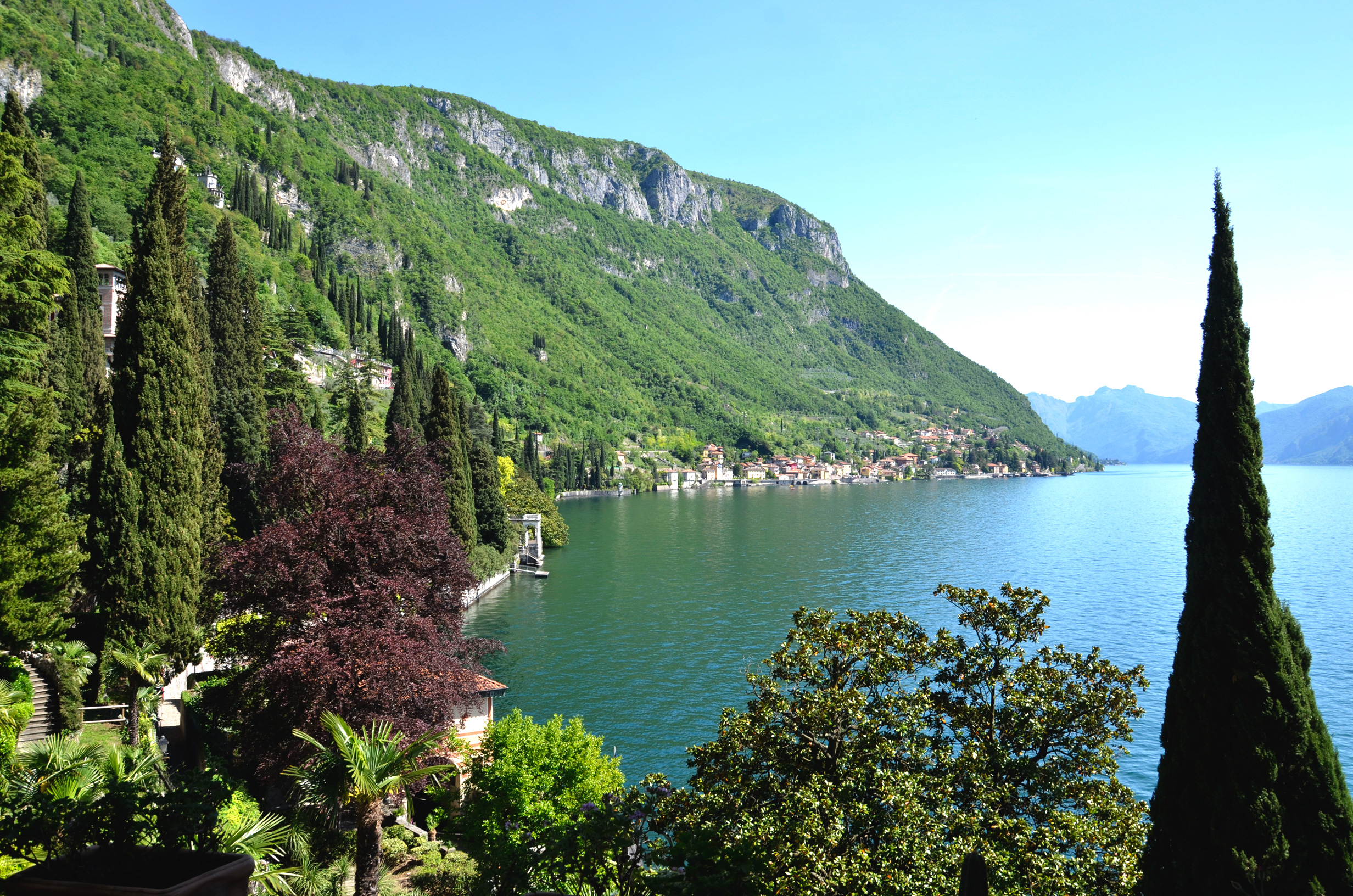
View on Lake Como

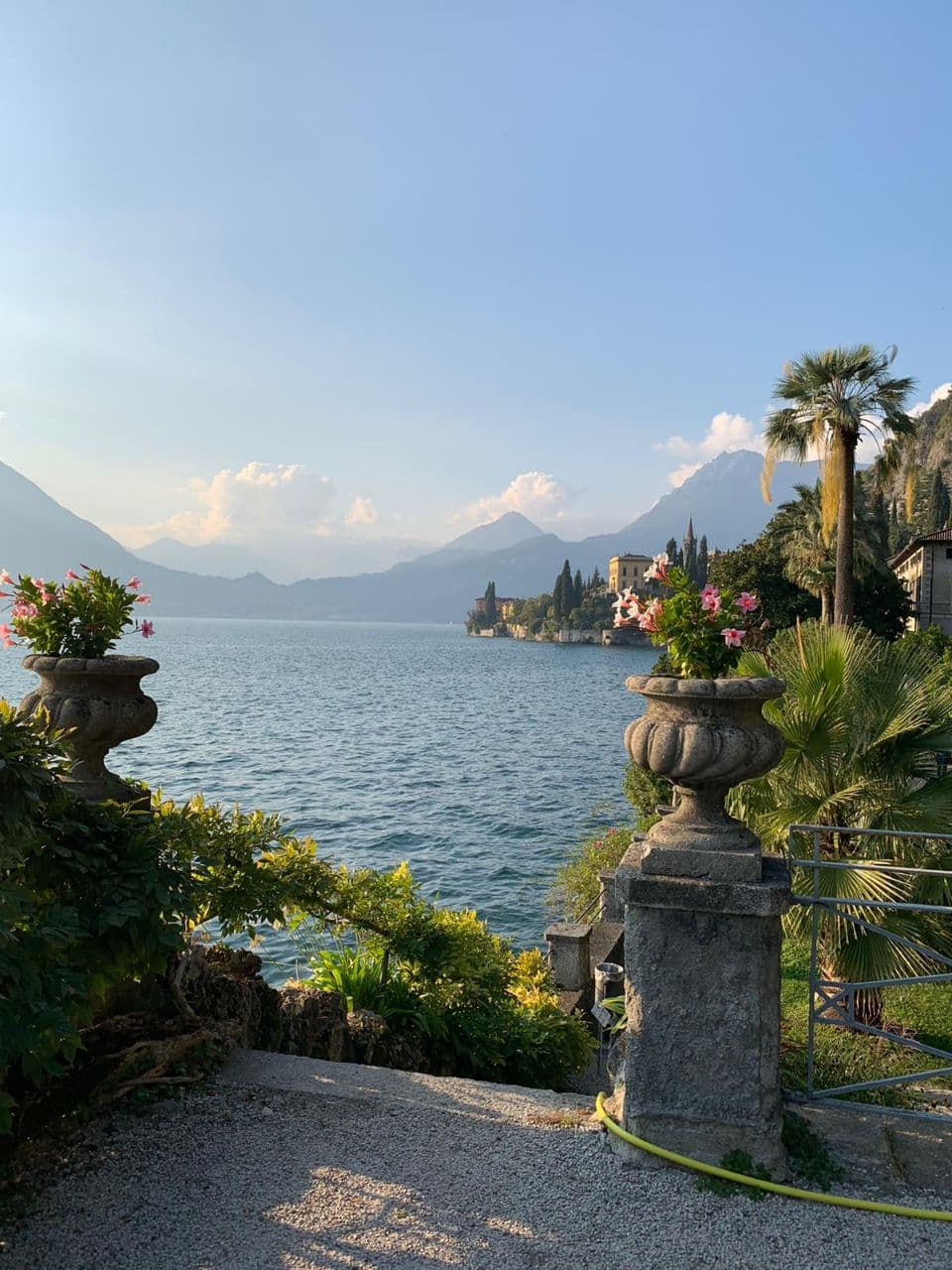
View on Lake Como

== See also ==
- Villa del Balbianello
- Villa Bernasconi
- Villa Carlotta
- Villa Erba
- Villa d'Este, Cernobbio
- Villa Melzi
- Villa Olmo
- Villa Serbelloni
- Villa Vigoni
