= Selma Hall =

Mansion in Jefferson County, Missouri

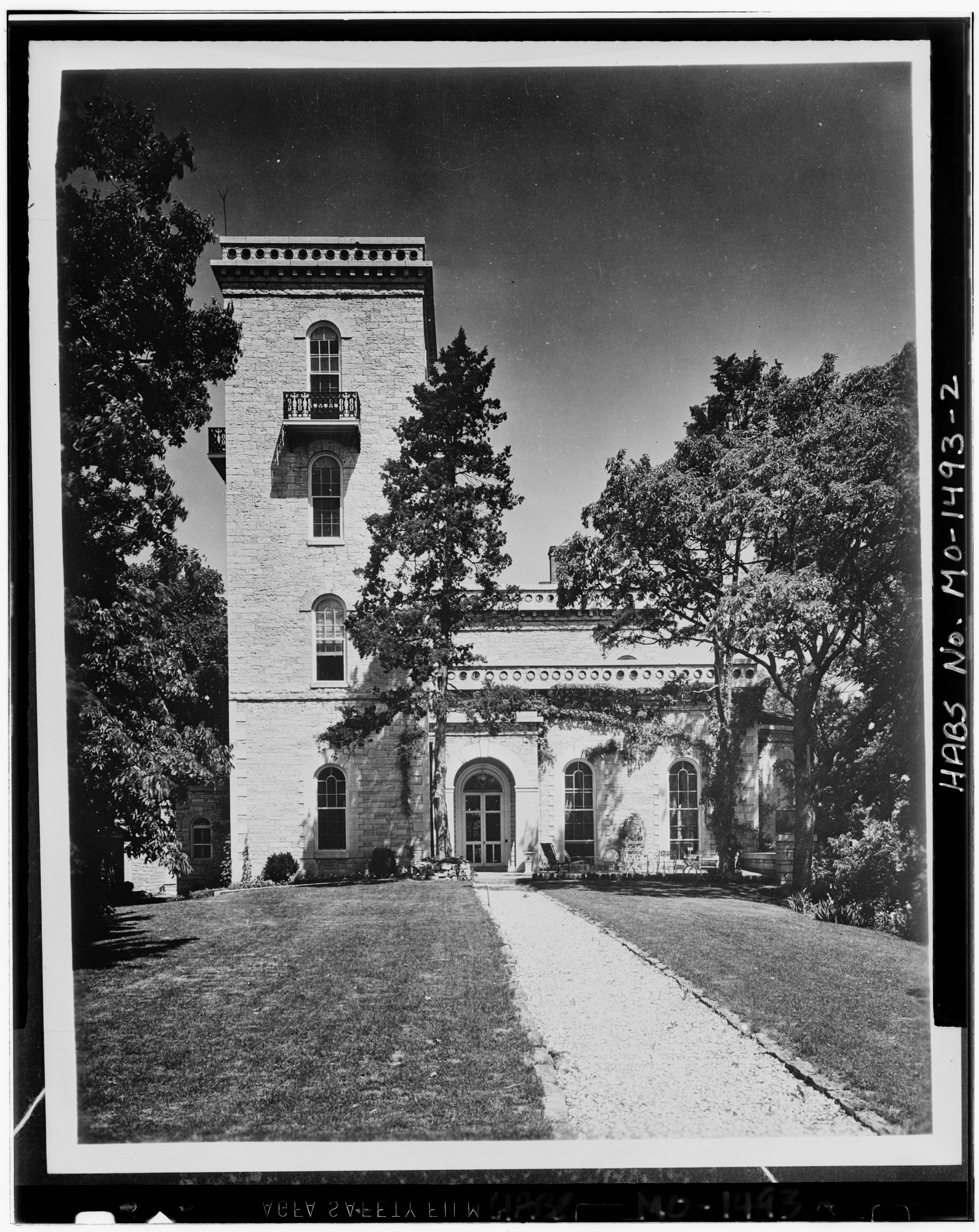
- Location: Festus, Jefferson County, Missouri
- Coordinates: 38°11′39″N 90°20′30″W
- Built: 1854
- Architect: George I. Barnett

Selma Hall also known as Selma Farm and Kennett Castle is a historic mansion and estate located in Jefferson County, Missouri along the Mississippi River. The mansion was designed in the style of Castello di Vezio by George I. Barnett and constructed in 1854 at a cost of $125,000 for Ferdinand Kennett. The mansion features a four-story tower constructed from locally quarried limestone by slave labor. Kennett and his brother Luther Kennett owned nearby lead mines, shot towers for the manufacture of bullets, steamboats, and slaves. The land was given to Ferdinand’s wife, Julia (née Deaderick), by her grandfather John Smith T, a wealthy lead miner and famous duelist. Ferdinand died in the mansion in 1861 before it was nearly destroyed during the Civil War by gun boats that fired upon the easy target from the Mississippi River below. The mansion was restored to its original appearance only to be destroyed again by fire in 1939, leading to a second restoration by then owner William O. Schock.

Before the mansion was owned by Schock, it passed from Robert Brookings to W. K. Cavanaugh. The mansion and property was purchased by the Mississippi River Fuel Corporation in 1952 for $450,000 and it was used a conference center. The Mississippi River Fuel Corporation owned a controlling interest in the Missouri Pacific Railroad which was eventually purchased by the Union Pacific Railroad in 1982 who also used the mansion as a corporate retreat and conference center. In 2020, Union Pacific decided to cut costs and attempted to sell the property and adjacent 18-hole golf course for $25 million, the property sold for an undisclosed amount to an anonymous LLC in June 2021.
