= Pirelli (disambiguation) =

Pirelli is an Italian multinational tyre manufacturer.

Pirelli may also refer to:

- Adolfo Pirelli, fictional character from Stephen Sondheim's musical Sweeney Todd: The Demon Barber of Fleet Street
- Pirelli (surname), Italian surname
- Pirelli Calendar, annual trade calendar published by the UK subsidiary of the Italian tyre manufacturing company Pirelli
- Pirelli Stadium, association football stadium on Princess Way in Burton upon Trent, Staffordshire, England
- Pirelli Tower, 32-storey skyscraper in Milan, Italy
- Pirelli World Challenge, North American auto racing series launched in 1990 by the Sports Car Club of America
