= Castello di Vezio =

Castle in northern Italy

Coordinates: 46°0′39″N 9°17′12″E

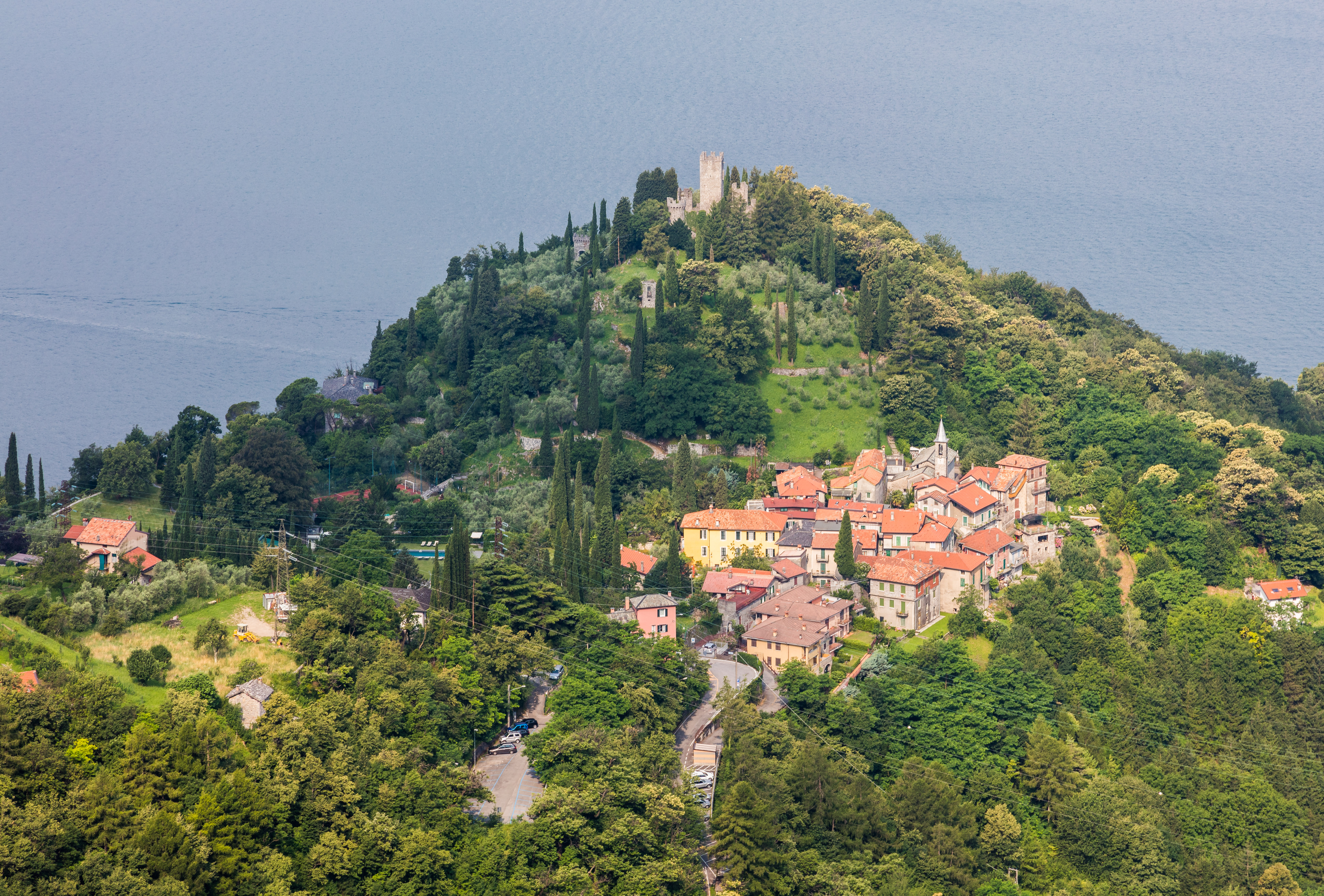

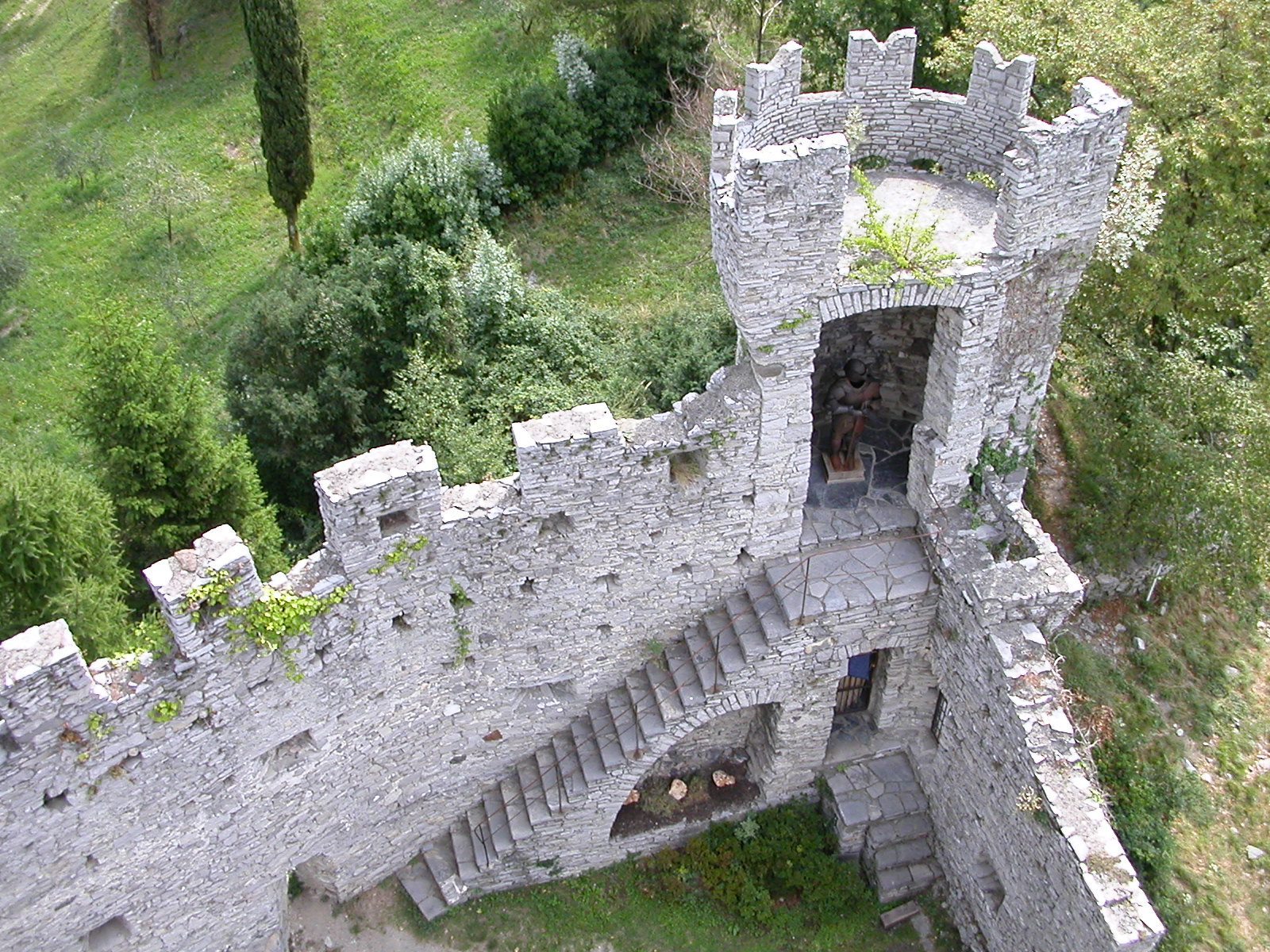
Castello di Vezio.

Castello di Vezio is a castle located nearby Varenna and Perledo, northern Italy. Characterized in the main tower by square merlons, similar to Cly Castle in Aosta Valley, it commands the Lake Como. It was once connected by walls to the village of Varenna below.

== History ==
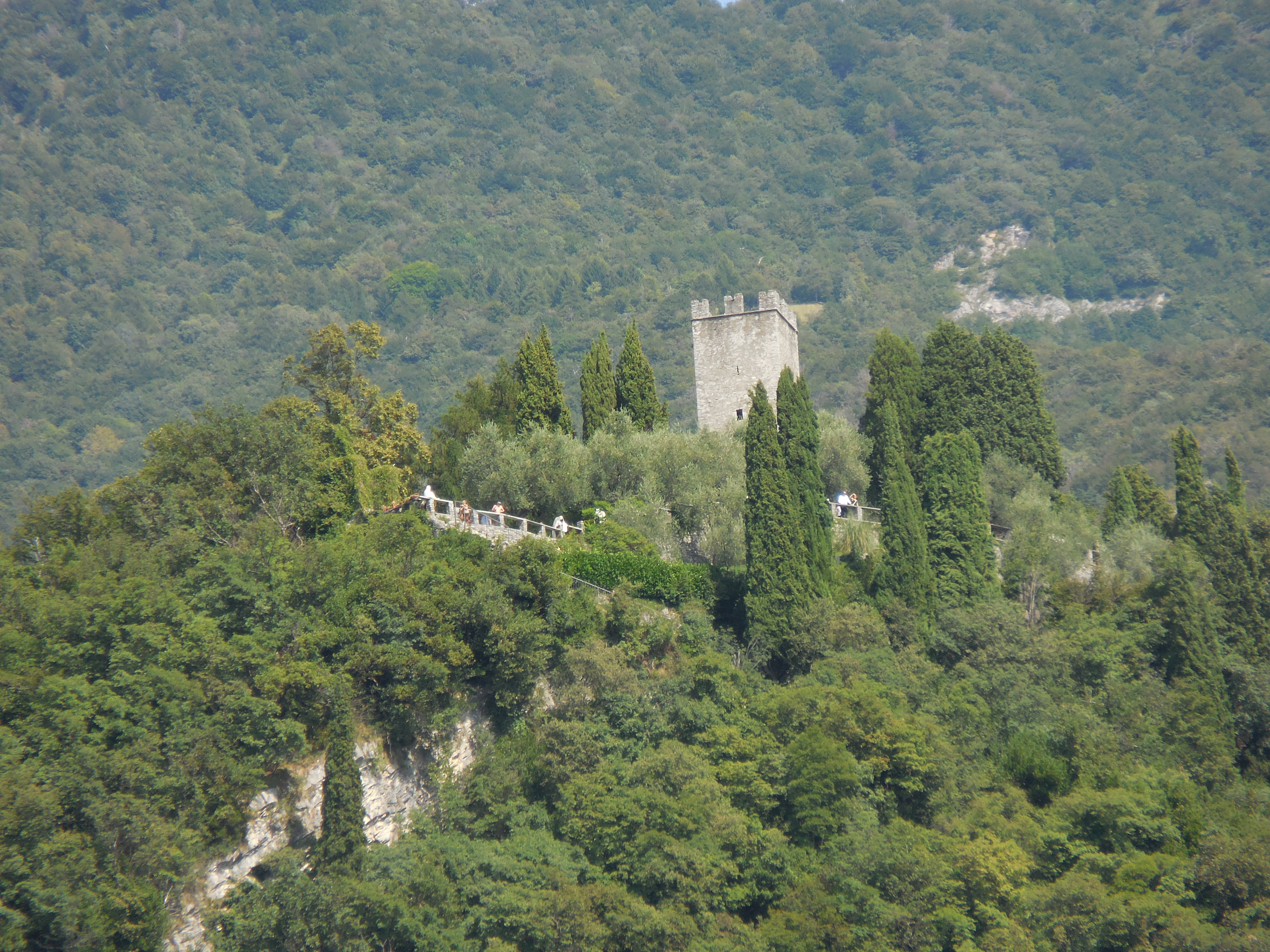
Ruins of Castello di Vezio above the village of Varenna from Lake Como

The castle was built in the late 11th-early 12th century and was restored several times in the following centuries. In the late 19th century, and in 1956, remains of tombs from the Iron Age, as well as weapons and armors, were found in the area.

The castle also had dungeons built during the First World War, as part of the defensive linea Cadorna planned by General Luigi Cadorna, Chief of Staff of the Italian army, to halt any German invasion southward from Switzerland. It currently houses gardens and a Eurasian eagle-owl named Artú. Falconering stopped in 2022.

It became open to the public in 1999. The tower houses a permanent exhibition dedicated to Lariosaurus, an extinct sea reptile from the Middle Triassic period, which takes its name from the lake after its discovery in Perledo in 1830.The castle is currently owned by the Greppi family from Milan.
