= Fiumelatte (river) =

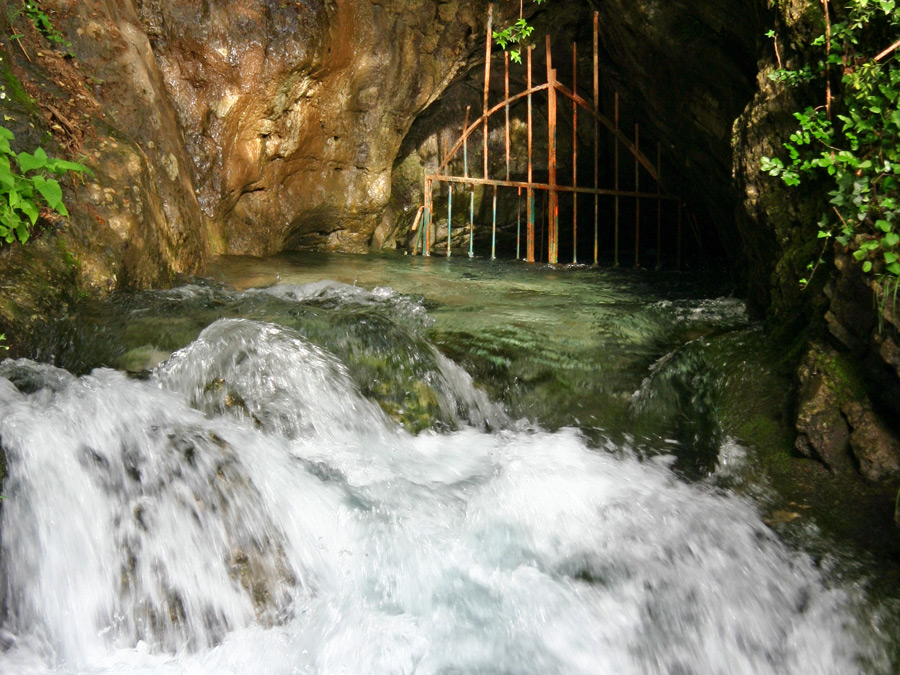
- The source

Location
- Country: Italy

Physical characteristics
- Mouth: Lake Como
  - coordinates: 46.0012°N 9.2917°E

Basin features
- Progression: Lake Como→ Adda→ Po→ Adriatic Sea

Fiumelaccio, the whitest river that descends from the mountain and the shortest one known.

— Leonardo da Vinci, Codex Atlanticus - C.A. 214 verso

Fiumelatte is a river in northern Italy. It flows from a cavity in the Grigna into Lake Como, just south of Varenna, it has an approximate length of 250 m (820 ft). The name Fiumelatte, composed from fiume (Italian for "river") and latte ("milk"), is due to the milky white color of its water. Leonardo da Vinci while staying in Lierna studied it for a long time and mentions it in his Atlantic Codex.

In the 1600s the sons of the high nobility had to visit it as part of the Grand Tour to form their culture.

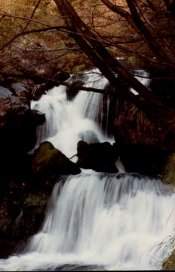
Fiumelatte

== Overview ==
One of the river's peculiarities is its annual intermittency: it usually dries in the middle of October to reappear in the second half of March; therefore it has been given the nickname Fiume delle due Madonne ("River of the two Madonnas"), alluding to the festivities of Annunciation (March 25) and Madonna del Rosario (October 7). This phenomenon could imply that the river is the vent of an unexplored underground cavity in the Grigna, which gets periodically filled.

The river is mentioned by the name Fiumelaccio in Leonardo da Vinci's Atlantic Codex:

It's the Fiumelaccio, which falls high from more than 100 ells from the vein where it is born, straight down on the lake, with inestimable uproar and noise.

Other authors who wrote about the river include Pliny the Elder and Lazzaro Spallanzani.

== History ==
The village of Fiumelatte has a nearby memorial dedicated to members of a partisan brigade shot on January 8, 1945, following the capture of Esino Lario. The six partisans were killed after returning to the valley to alert the command of the encroachment in Switzerland.
