= Giovanni Battista Pirelli =

Italian mathematician and engineer

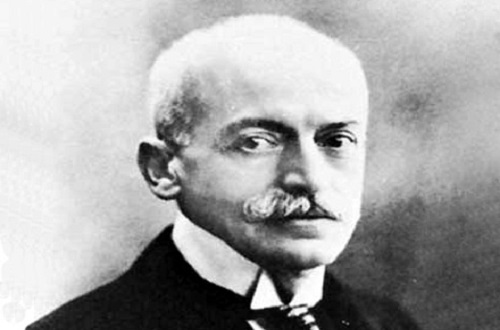
- Born: 27 December 1848; Varenna, Italy
- Died: 20 October 1932 (aged 83); Milan, Italy
- Occupation: Businessman
- Spouse: Maria Sormani
- Children: Alberto Pirelli, Piero Pirelli
- Relatives: Leopoldo Pirelli

Giovanni Battista Alberto Pirelli (Varenna, 27 December 1848 – Milan, 20 October 1932) was an Italian entrepreneur, engineer and politician, and the founder of the Pirelli company in Milan. In 1919 he was the president of Confindustria.

== Early life ==
Pirelli, the son of Rosa Riva and Santino Pirelli, was the eighth of ten children. His father was a baker, and died when he was eight years old. Pirelli attended the Polytechnic University of Milan.

== Career ==
After his graduation, his professor Giuseppe Colombo, who was an entrepreneur as well as an academic, financed his travels to Germany and France to learn about manufacturing. He identified rubber manufacturing, a new business at the time, as a promising industry to bring to Italy. In 1872, he founded the Pirelli company, using both private capital and bank loans, quickly expanding the business by opening factories in Spain and in North and South America.
