= Leopoldo Pirelli =

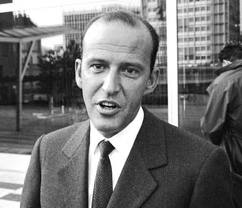
- Leopoldo Pirelli in 50s
- Born: 1925; Velate, Italy
- Died: January 23, 2007 (aged 81–82); Portofino, Italy
- Occupation: Businessman
- Spouse: Giulia Ferlito
- Children: Cecilia Pirelli; Alberto Pirelli
- Parents: Alberto Pirelli (father); Lodovica Zambeletti (mother)
- Relatives: Giovanni Battista Pirelli (paternal grandfather)

Leopoldo Pirelli (Velate, 1925 – Portofino, January 23, 2007) was an Italian heir and businessman.

== Early life ==
Leopoldo Pirelli was born in 1925 in Velate, Italy. His father was the prominent Italian industrialist Alberto Pirelli and his mother was Lodovica Zambeletti, daughter of the pharmaceutical industrialist Leopoldo Zambeletti. His paternal grandfather, Giovanni Battista Pirelli, was the founder of Pirelli.

== Career ==
Pirelli joined Pirelli as a member of the Pirelli SpA board in 1954 and appointed deputy chairman serving from 1956 to 1965. He served as its president from 1965 to 1996. In 1992, he remained chairman but let his son-in-law, Marco Tronchetti Provera, take over as managing director and executive deputy chairman.

== Personal life ==
Pirelli and his wife Giulia Ferlito had a daughter, Cecilia (1952, married secondly to Marco Tronchetti Provera), and a son, Alberto (1954). Then, he was partner to publisher Rosellina Archinto for almost forty years.

== Death ==
Pirelli died on January 23, 2007, in Portofino, Italy.
