= Varenna =

Municipality in Lombardy, Italy

Varenna Varena (Lombard)
- Comune
- Comune di Varenna
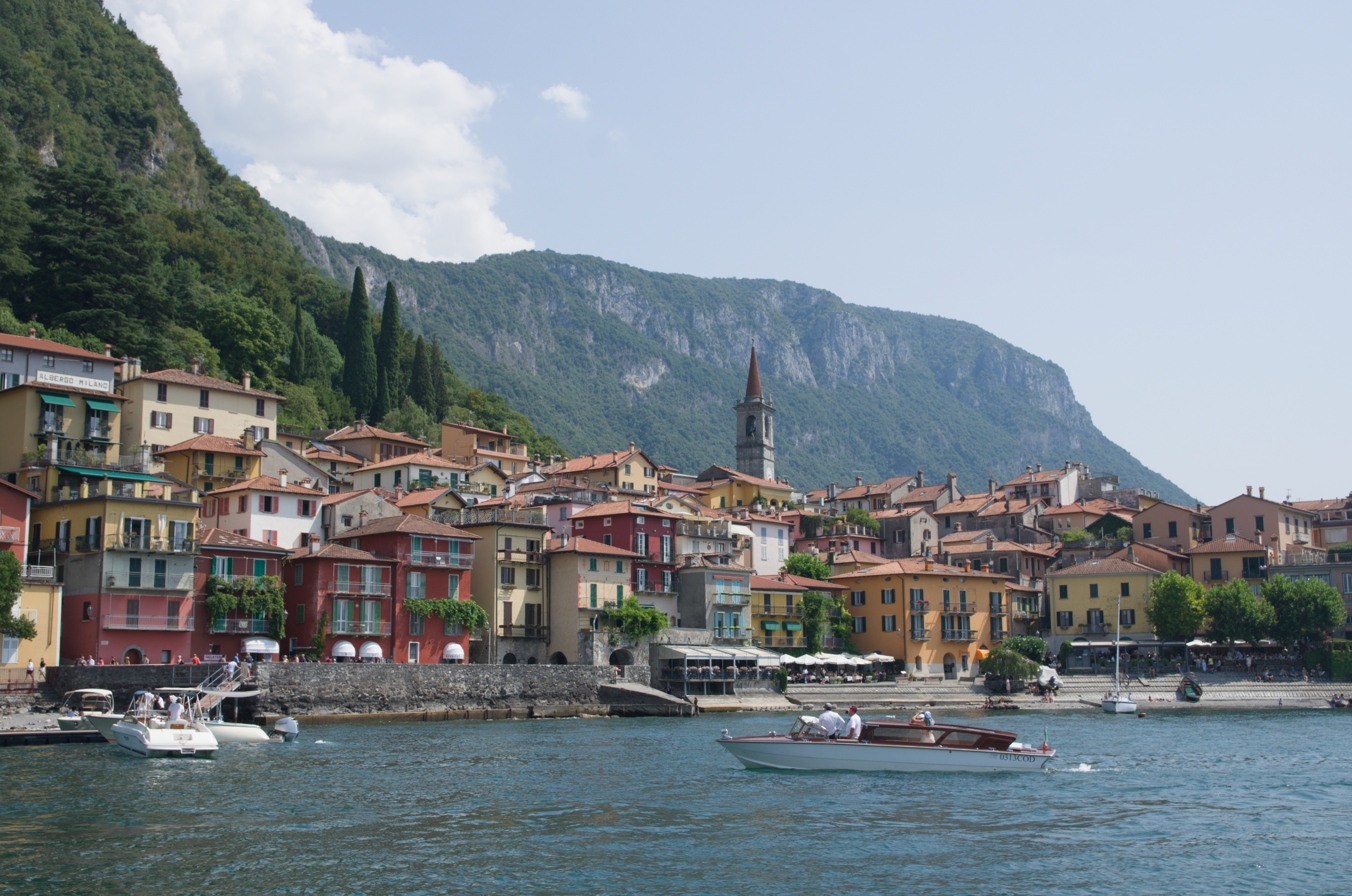
- Varenna seen from an approaching ferry

- Location within Italy Location within Lombardy
- Coordinates: 46°1′N 9°17′E
- Country: Italy
- Region: Lombardy
- Province: Lecco (LC)
- Frazioni: Fiumelatte

Government
  - Mayor: Carlo Molteni

Area
  - Total: 11.2 km^{2} (4.3 sq mi)
- Elevation: 220 m (720 ft)

Population (31 December 2010)
  - Total: 812
  - Density: 72.5/km^{2} (188/sq mi)
- Demonym: Varennesi
- Time zone: UTC+1 (CET)
  - Summer (DST): UTC+2 (CEST)
- Postal code: 23829
- Dialing code: 0341
- Website: www.comune.varenna.lc.it

Varenna (Comasco, Lecchese: Varena) is a comune (municipality) on Lake Como in the Province of Lecco in the Italian region of Lombardy, located about 60 kilometres (37 mi) north of Milan and about 20 kilometres (12 mi) northwest of Lecco.

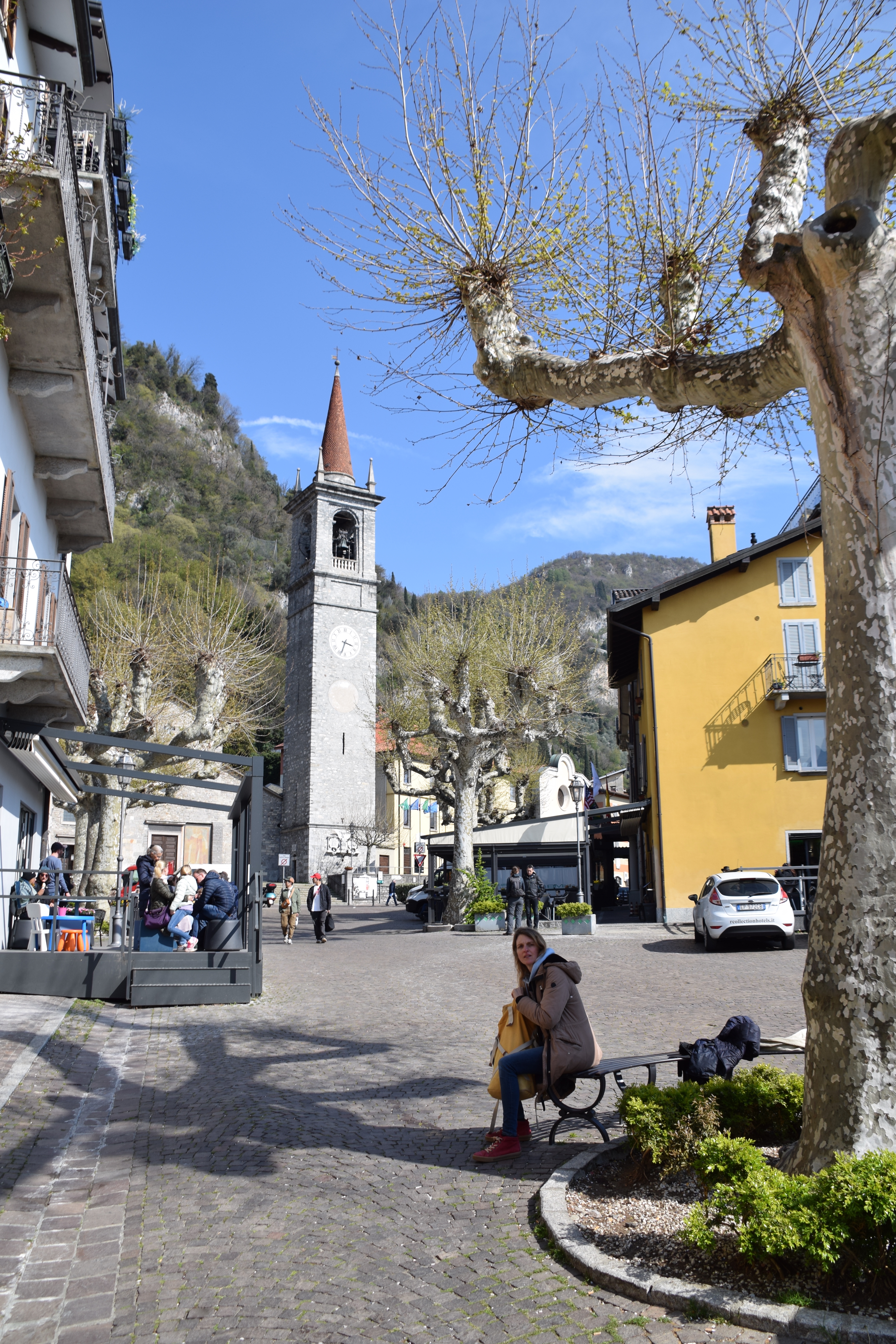
Piazza San Giorgio

Varenna was founded by local fishermen in AD 769 and was later allied with the commune of Milan. In 1126 it was destroyed by the rival commune of Como, and later received the refugees from the Isola Comacina, who had met the same fate (1169).

Varenna borders the following municipalities: Esino Lario, Lierna, Oliveto Lario, Perledo. The main sights are the Castello di Vezio, a small museum dedicated to Lariosaurus (a Middle Triassic sea reptile related to turtles), as well as the beautiful gardens at Villa Monastero. Across the lake in the province of Como are: Bellagio, Griante and Menaggio.

Villa Monastero, in between Varenna and Fiumelatte is nowadays a museum, botanical garden and convention center. It was founded as a Cistercian monastery in the 11th or 12th century. It is served by Varenna-Esino-Perledo station, on the Tirano–Lecco railway.

== People ==
- Giovanni Battista Pirelli (1848–1932), entrepreneur, engineer and politician who founded Pirelli & C. in Milan in 1872.

== Gallery ==
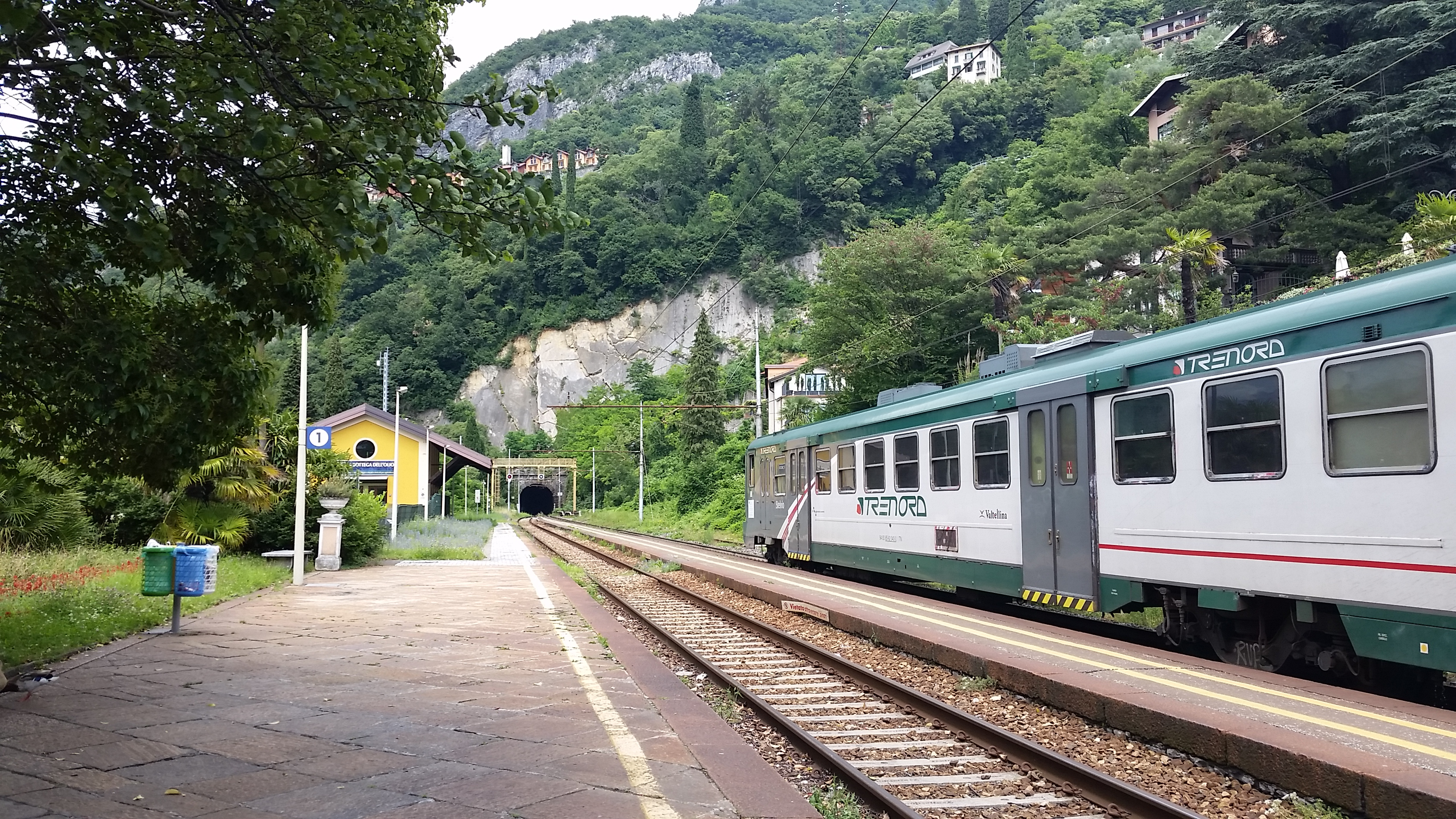
The Varenna-Esino-Perledo station

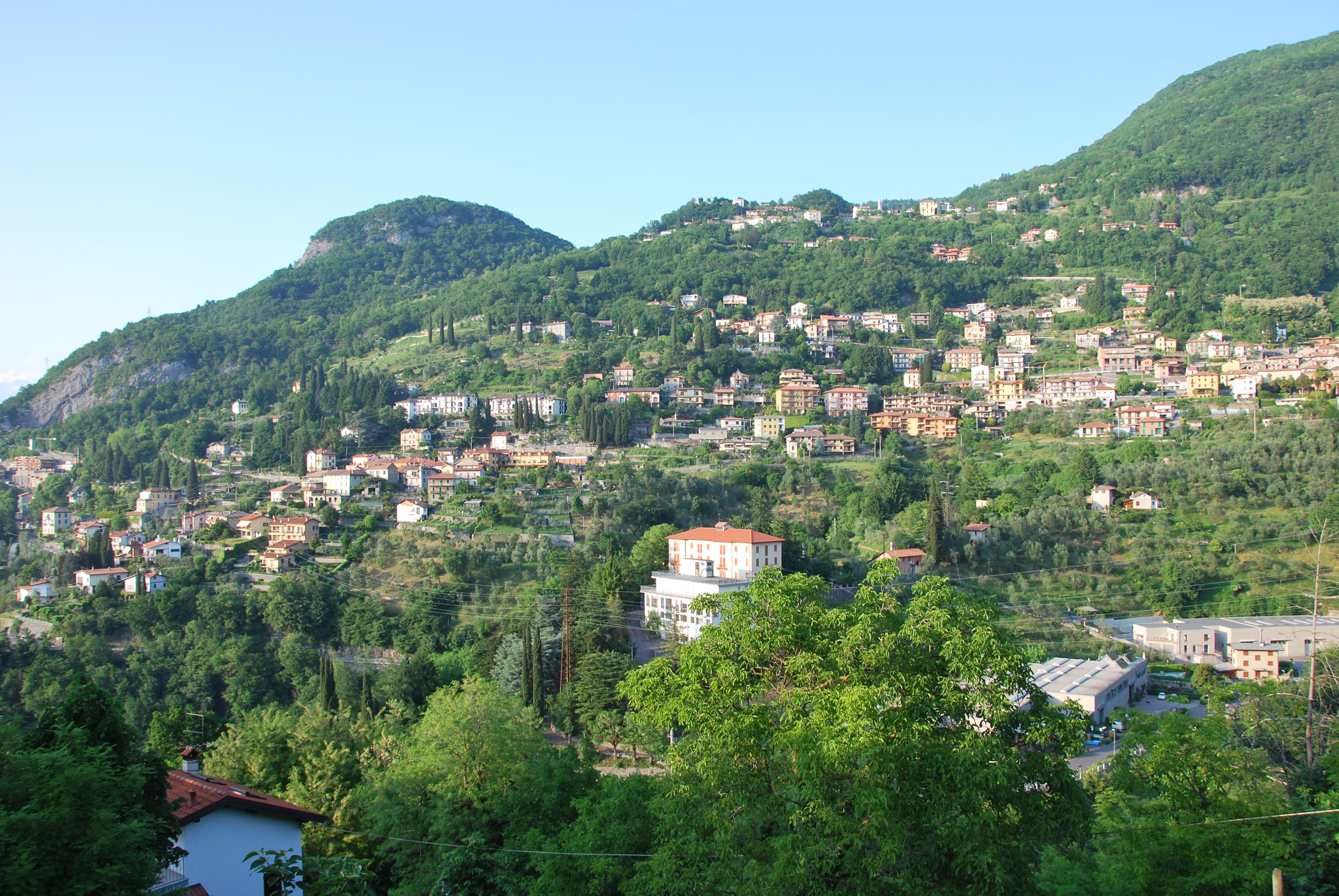
View from Castello di Vezio

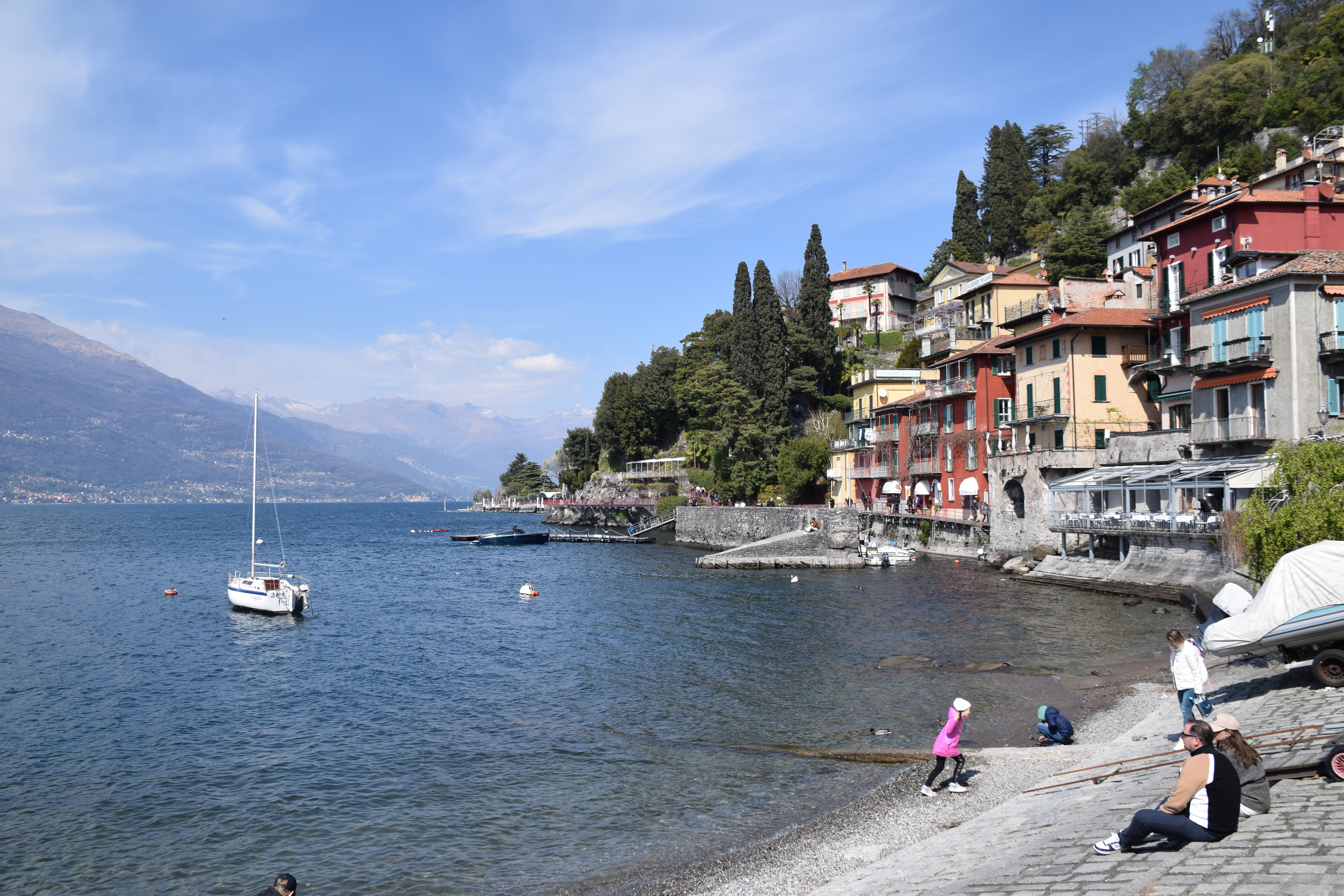
Vecchio Porto
